= Lists of country subdivisions =

Ranked lists of country subdivisions.

== Economics ==
- List of country subdivisions by GDP
- List of country subdivisions by GDP over 100 billion US dollars
- List of counties of Albania by GDP
- List of Argentine provinces by GDP
- List of Austrian states by GDP
- List of Australian states and territories by GDP
- List of ASEAN country subdivisions by GDP
- List of regions of Baltic States by GDP
- List of Belgian provinces by GDP
- List of Brazilian states by GDP
- List of Brazilian states by poverty rate
- List of Bulgarian provinces by GDP
- List of governments in Canada by annual expenditures
- List of Canadian provinces and territories by GDP
- List of Canadian provinces by unemployment rate
- List of Chinese administrative divisions by exports
- List of Chinese provincial-level divisions by GDP
- List of Chinese provincial-level divisions by GDP per capita
- List of Chinese administrative divisions by tax revenues
- List of Colombian departments by GDP
- List of Croatian counties by GDP
- List of Czech regions by GDP
- List of governorates of Egypt by GDP
- List of European regions by GDP
- List of European regions by unemployment rate
- List of French regions and overseas collectivities by GDP
- List of French regions and overseas departments by GRP per capita
- List of German states by exports
- List of German states by GDP
- List of German states by GRP per capita
- List of German states by household income
- List of German states by poverty rate
- List of German states by unemployment rate
- List of Greek subdivisions by GDP
- List of Hungarian counties by GDP
- List of Indian states and union territories by exports
- List of Indian states and union territories by GDP
- List of Indian states and union territories by GDP per capita
- List of Indian states and union territories by poverty rate
- List of Indian states and union territories by tax revenues
- List of states and union territories of India by unemployment rate
- List of Indonesian provinces by GDP
- List of Indonesian provinces by GRP per capita
- List of Indonesian provinces by poverty rate
- List of Italian regions by GDP
- List of Italian regions by GDP
- List of Japanese prefectures by GDP
- List of Japanese prefectures by GDP per capita
- List of regions of Kazakhstan by GDP
- List of counties of Kenya by GDP
- List of counties of Kenya by poverty rate
- List of Malaysian states by GDP
- List of Malaysian states by household income
- List of Malaysian states and municipalities by exports
- List of Mexican states by GDP
- List of Mexican states by GDP per capita
- List of Mexican states by poverty rate
- List of Mexican states by unemployment
- List of Mongolian provinces by GDP
- List of Nepalese provinces by GDP
- List of Nigerian states by GDP
- List of Nigerian states by poverty rate
- List of Norwegian counties by GDP
- List of Pakistani administrative units by GDP
- List of regions of Peru by GDP
- List of regions of the Philippines by GDP
- List of regions of Poland by GDP
- List of Portuguese administrative divisions by GDP
- List of Philippine provinces and regions by poverty rate
- List of Romanian counties by foreign trade
- List of Romanian counties by GDP
- List of Russian federal subjects by average wage
- List of Russian federal subjects by GRP
- List of federal subjects of Russia by GDP per capita
- List of federal subjects of Russia by poverty rate
- List of federal subjects of Russia by unemployment rate
- List of Serbian regions by GDP
- List of Slovak regions by GDP
- List of South African provinces by GDP
- List of South African provinces by GDP per capita
- List of South African provinces by poverty rate
- List of South Korean regions by GDP
- List of Spanish autonomous communities by GDP
- List of Spanish autonomous communities by median income
- List of Spanish autonomous communities by unemployment rate
- List of Swiss cantons by GRP
- List of regions of Tanzania by GDP
- List of regions of Tanzania by poverty rate
- List of Thai provinces by GPP
- List of Turkish provinces by GDP
- List of Ukrainian subdivisions by GRP
- List of Ukrainian oblasts and territories by salary
- List of regions of the United Kingdom by GRP
- List of regions of the United Kingdom by GRP per capita
- List of U.S. states by the number of billionaires
- List of U.S. states by credit rating
- List of U.S. states and territories by economic growth rate
- List of U.S. states and territories by GDP
- List of U.S. states by employment rate
- List of U.S. states and territories by exports and imports
- List of U.S. states and territories by income
- List of U.S. states and territories by income inequality
- List of U.S. states by median home price
- List of U.S. states and territories by median wage and mean wage
- List of U.S. states by the number of millionaire households
- List of U.S. states and territories by unemployment rate
- List of U.S. states by minimum wage
- List of Vietnamese subdivisions by GDP

== Geography ==
- List of first-level administrative divisions by area
- List of Australian states and territories by area
- List of Brazilian states by highest point
- Forest cover by province or territory in Canada
- List of Chinese administrative divisions by area
- List of Chinese administrative divisions by highest point
- List of Colombian departments by area
- List of Ghanaian regions by area
- Forest cover by state in India
- List of Indian states and union territories by highest point
- List of Indonesian provinces by highest point
- List of Japanese prefectures by area
- List of Mexican states by area
- List of Nigerian states by area
- List of Pakistani administrative divisions by highest elevation
- List of federal subjects of Russia by area
- Forest cover by federal subject in Russia
- List of South African provinces by area
- List of Ukrainian oblasts and territories by area
- List of US states and territories by area
- List of US states and territories by coastline
- List of US states and territories by elevation
- Forest cover by state and territory in the United States

== Health ==
- List of Brazilian states by life expectancy
- List of Brazilian states by infant mortality
- List of Chinese administrative divisions by life expectancy
- List of administrative divisions in China by infant mortality
- List of European regions by life expectancy
- List of French departments by life expectancy
- List of German states by life expectancy
- List of Indian states by child nutrition
- Indian states ranking by institutional delivery
- List of Indian states by life expectancy at birth
- List of federal subjects of Russia by life expectancy
- List of Mexican states by life expectancy
- List of Mexican states by infant mortality
- List of Spanish provinces by life expectancy
- List of South African provinces by life expectancy
- List of Turkish provinces by life expectancy
- List of US states by life expectancy
- List of US states and territories by infant mortality rates

== Population ==
- List of first-level administrative divisions by population
- List of counties of Albania by population
- List of Canadian provinces and territories by historical population
- List of Canadian provinces and territories by population
- List of Chinese administrative divisions by ethnic group
- List of Chinese administrative divisions by natural growth rate
- List of Chinese administrative divisions by population
- List of Chinese administrative divisions by sex ratio
- List of Colombian departments by population
- List of municipalities of Estonia by population
- List of Ethiopian regional states by population
- List of European regions by fertility rate
- List of French departments by population
- List of Ghanaian regions by population
- List of German states by fertility rate
- List of German states by population
- List of states and union territories of India by fertility rate
- List of states in India by past population
- List of states and union territories of India by population
- List of Irish counties by population
- List of Japanese prefectures by population
- List of counties of Kenya by population
- List of Mexican states by population
- List of Mexican states by population density
- List of Mexican states by population growth rate
- List of Nepalese provinces by population
- List of Nigerian states by population
- List of Philippine provinces by population
- List of Romanian counties by population
- List of federal subjects of Russia by total fertility rate
- List of federal subjects of Russia by population
- List of South African provinces by population
- List of South African provinces by population density
- List of Swedish counties by fertility rate
- List of Ukrainian oblasts and territories by population
- List of US states by population
- List of US states by population density
- List of US states and territories by African-American population
- List of US states by Hispanic and Latino population
- List of US states by non-Hispanic white population
- List of US states and territories by historical population
- List of US states and territories by birth and death rates
- List of US states and territories by fertility rate
- List of US states and territories by infant mortality rates
- List of US states and territories by immigrant population
- List of US states and territories by median age
- List of US states and territories by race/ethnicity
- List of US states and territories by religiosity
- List of Zimbabwean provinces by population

== Safety ==
- List of Brazilian states by murder rate
- List of states and union territories of India by crime rate
- Indian states ranking by incidents of human trafficking
- Indian states ranking by safety of women
- List of Mexican states by homicides
- List of federal subjects of Russia by murder rate
- List of US states by gun violence
- List of US states and territories by intentional homicide rate
- List of US states and territories by incarceration and correctional supervision rate
- List of US states and territories by violent crime rate

== See also ==
- Ranked lists of country subdivisions topics
- Lists of administrative divisions topics
- International rankings by country
