= List of German states by GRDP =

Overview of German states by GRDP

This article is about the gross regional domestic product (GRDP) of German states. Most figures are from the Federal Statistical Office of Germany; figures from other sources are otherwise referenced. The GRDP of German states are shown in euro (€).

German states by GRDP (2024): >€600 billion €300–400 billion €150–300 billion <€150 billion

== 2025 list ==
States	GDP (mil. €)	GDP per capita (€)
Germany	4,469,910	53,482
North Rhine-Westphalia	909,411	49,682
Bavaria	824,243	62,212
Baden-Württemberg	667,105	59,320
Lower Saxony	399,397	49,646
Hesse	382,411	60,567
Berlin	218,288	59,233
Rhineland-Palatinate	185,270	44,864
Hamburg	168,300	90,359
Saxony	167,973	41,553
Schleswig-Holstein	131,247	44,347
Brandenburg	104,100	40,716
Saxony-Anhalt	81,755	38,282
Thuringia	80,639	38,394
Mecklenburg-Vorpommern	63,585	40,407
Saarland	43,174	42,656
Bremen	43,011	61,019

== See also ==
- List of German cities by GDP
- List of German states by Human Development Index
- List of German states by fertility rate
- List of German states by life expectancy
- List of German states by unemployment rate
- List of German states by household income
- List of German states by exports
- States of Germany
