= Taxation in China =

Taxes provide the most important revenue source for the government of the People's Republic of China. Value-added tax (VAT) produces the largest share of tax revenue in China, while corporate income tax produces the next largest share.

Tax is a key component of China’s macro-economic policy and greatly affects the country’s economic and social development. With the changes made since the 1994 tax reform, China has sought to set up a streamlined tax system geared to a socialist market economy.

Most taxes are based on regulations established by the State Council. Detailed tax rules are established by the State Council Committee on Tariff Regulations, the Ministry of Finance, the State Taxation Administration, and the Customs Office. A few kinds of taxes are based on laws passed by the National People's Congress.

== Types of taxes ==
VAT produces the largest share of China's tax revenue. Corporate income tax is the next largest.

Taxes in China include:

- Turnover taxes. This includes VAT and Consumption Tax. Consumption taxes were first implemented in 1994 on items including tobacco, alcohol, cosmetics, and cars, among other goods. The consumption tax was expanded in 2006 to apply to items including yachts, luxury watches, golf equipment, and single use chopsticks, among others. Consumption tax is mainly collected at production and importation. Business tax was a local tax, but replaced by the implementation of VAT nationwide in 2016.
- Income taxes. This includes Enterprise Income Tax (effective prior to 2008, applicable to such domestic enterprises as state-owned enterprises, collectively owned enterprises, private enterprises, joint operation enterprises and joint equity enterprises) and Individual Income Tax. These taxes are levied on the basis of the profits gained by producers or dealers, or the income earned by individuals. The Enterprise Income Tax Law of the People's Republic of China has replaced the above two enterprise taxes as of 1 January 2008. Individual income tax in the PRC was not collected until 1980. "There are no local taxes on personal income in China". The top marginal tax rate on high income earners is 45% for the portion of income above 960,000 RMB. Different sources of personal income are taxed differently (for example, income from wages are taxed on a progressive rate; income from royalties is taxed at a flat rate). Personal income tax accounts for less than 7% of China's tax revenue, as of 2019.

Generally, China's income tax is a residential system in which income tax is collected both on domestic and foreign income.

Since 1 January 2008, the general corporate income tax rate for both domestic enterprises and foreign enterprises is 25%. Various exceptions exist. 15% tax rate is a concession rate for high-tech companies. Other preferential tax policies may apply for small, low-profit enterprises, enterprises in public infrastructure construction, enterprises employing veterans, or enterprises engaged in cultural production (such as opera troupes).

Hong Kong and Macau tax corporate income on the basis of territoriality -- only income from the domestic territory is taxed.

- Resource taxes. This consists of Resource Tax and Urban and Township Land Use Tax. These taxes are applicable to the exploiters engaged in natural resource exploitation or to the users of urban and township land. These taxes reflect the chargeable use of state-owned natural resources, and aim to adjust the different profits derived by taxpayers who have access to different availability of natural resources.
- Taxes for special purposes. These taxes are City Maintenance and Construction Tax, Farmland Occupation Tax, Fixed Asset Investment Orientation Regulation Tax, Land Appreciation Tax, and Vehicle Acquisition Tax. These taxes are levied on specific items for special regulative purposes.
- Behavioural taxes. This includes Vehicle and Vessel Usage Tax, Vehicle and Vessel Usage License Plate Tax, Stamp Tax, Deed Tax, Securities Exchange Tax (not yet levied), Slaughter Tax and Banquet Tax. These taxes are levied on specified behaviour.
- Customs duties. Customs duties are imposed on the goods and articles imported into and exported out of the territory of the People's Republic of China, including Excise Tax.
- Environmental Protection Tax: The environmental protection tax was passed in 2016 and became effective in 2018. Its purpose is to protect the environment, reduce pollutant emissions, and promote ecological improvement. Taxpayers are enterprises, businesses, and production/management that directly discharge taxable pollutants into the environment in the territory of the People's Republic of China and other waters under the jurisdiction of the People's Republic of China. - In case of tax exception (1) When enterprises, public institutions and other producers/operators discharge taxable pollutants into centralized sewage and domestic waste treatment facilities established by law. (2) When enterprises, public institutions and other producers/operators store or dispose of solid waste in facilities or locations that meet national and local standards for environmental protection. Taxable pollutants include solid waste, atmospheric pollutants, water pollutants, and noise.

Mined minerals are taxed at a low rate in comparison to the value of the extracted minerals themselves. The rates vary depend on the type and grade of minerals. Resource tax was first established in 1984 on coal, oil, and natural gas. The 1994 tax reform expanded the resource tax to include also include ferrous metals, nonferrous metals, nonmetallic minerals, and salt. Resource taxes were based on the volume of minerals until 2011, when resource taxes became based on the sales value of minerals.

China does not have personal property taxes. Property tax only applies to business property. Since the early 2010s, the Ministry of Finance has sought to implement personal property taxes but has been opposed by the National People's Congress and many local governments. As of at least early 2024, no personal property tax measures have made it on to the legislative agenda. Two of China’s largest cities, Chongqing and Shanghai, have trialed property taxes between 0.4% and 1.2% since 2011, mainly targeting second homes, luxury properties, and purchases by non-residents.

China also does not have capital gains tax, gift tax, or estate tax. Interest is also not taxed.

As the entrepreneurs that started with Deng Xiaoping's reforms die, the lack of estate tax is seen as a challenge. Their inheritances (estimated to be 2 trillion dollars between 2025 and 2035) would concentrate wealth against the stated policy of "common prosperity" the Chinese Communist Party. Introducing a estate tax would require transparency about holdings, and, since a lot of the wealth is linked to political officers, revealing it would promote mistrust against the power structure.

Land use sales are a major non-tax component of government revenues. In China, land is not privately owned. It cannot be permanently owned by private individuals or businesses. Local governments own urban land and rural land is collectively owned. Local governments generate significant revenue by selling urban land. They also purchase rural land and resell it at a higher price as urban land.

China's fiscal year is the same as the calendar year. In October 2026, China made effective a new tax on offshore trusts.

== Tax filing and payment ==
Depending on the form of tax, taxpayers in China are required to file tax returns periodically or annually. Filing tax returns often entails giving detailed information about taxpayers’ income, expenses, deductions, and credits. The information provided is used by the tax authorities to assess the taxpayer's compliance with tax laws and regulations and to calculate the taxpayer's tax due. Taxpayers in China are subject to stringent filing and payment deadlines that must be met in order to avoid penalties and enforcement measures.

=== Monthly and quarterly filing of tax returns ===
Value Added Tax (VAT), Corporate Income Tax (CIT), Consumption Tax (CT), Resource Tax, and Environmental Protection Tax are taxes that are paid on a monthly or quarterly basis. If taxpayers must file and pay taxes on a monthly basis, they are obligated to do so within the first 15 days of the following month. They must also ensure that the tax authorities must receive tax returns and payments on or before this date. This deadline is set out in the "Provisions of the State Administration of Taxation on the Time Limit for Tax Declaration and Payment”. The main types of monthly taxes include Individual Income Tax(IIT), Value Added Tax, Resource Tax, and Corporate Income Tax.

In China, several taxes have a quarterly reporting requirement. The quarterly tax filings are usually required for CIT and VAT, among others. Taxpayers with quarterly filing deadlines must submit their tax returns within the first 15 days of the month following the end of each quarter (April, July, October, and January). Urban Maintenance And Construction Tax(UMCT), the Education Surcharge, and the Local Education Surcharge are taxes that are due at the same time as the VAT and CT and are paid at the same time, respectively your tax filing frequency.

== General anti-avoidance rules (GAAR) ==
Tax evasion was common in China due to underdeveloped tax collection mechanisms and weak law enforcement in the 1980s and early 1990s. To combat tax evasion and other forms of tax avoidance, China has implemented the General Anti-Avoidance of Tax Evasion Regulations (GAAR). The GAAR was introduced for the first time in China in 2008 in the PRC Enterprise Income Tax Law and has subsequently undergone numerous updates and revisions. GAAR's foundational objective is to prevent taxpayers from employing aggressive tax planning techniques to reduce or eliminate their tax obligations. Any tax avoidance arrangement by an enterprise in China is subject to the General Anti-Avoidance Rule, which attempts to guarantee that the arrangement serves legitimate commercial goals and not solely to achieve tax benefits. Investigating whether the company's intention for the tax arrangement is reasonable and legal, as opposed to an illegal attempt to acquire tax benefits, is the goal. Tax authorities can disregard or recharacterize transactions that they deem to be artificial or to lack economic substance under the Chinese GAAR regulations. If a GAAR investigation is to be initiated, the local tax authorities must first obtain approval from the State Administration of Taxation. The request must be elevated through the several higher level tax authorities, which are above the local tax authority, in order to receive this approval. Taxpayers subject to the GAAR provisions in China must provide sufficient documentation to back up the commercial purpose of their transactions, transaction documentation, communications between the taxpayer and parties involved in the transaction, and documentation that can demonstrate that the arrangement has a non-tax avoidance purpose. The tax authorities in China must inform the taxpayer in writing of any challenges made to a transaction under the GAAR provisions and state their justifications.

It is considered that there is no legitimate commercial purpose in the following cases:

(1) More than 75% of the income of foreign enterprises comes from taxable assets in China.

(2) At any point in the preceding year, more than 90% of the foreign corporation's asset value (excluding cash) consists of Chinese assets;

(3) The foreign company has only limited activities and risks, and although legally fully incorporated, it has virtually no economic existence. This provision is specifically aimed at shell companies and similar arrangements.

(4) Overseas tax burden is less compared to direct remittances.

However, a transaction will not be considered an indirect transfer in the following situations:

(1) The exchange of publicly listed shares on a stock market;

(2) When the income would be exempt from Chinese taxation under a relevant tax treaty or agreement if the transaction were direct;

(3) When all of the following conditions are met in the transaction:

The two parties involved in the indirect transfer are part of the same corporate group, where either the transferring company owns more than 80 percent of the shares of the receiving company, or vice versa, or a third company owns over 80 percent of the shares in both the transferring and receiving companies.

The transfer does not result in a reduced tax liability in China.

The receiving company fully pays for the transfer using its own equity.

== Tax governance ==
Most taxes are based on regulations established by the State Council. Detailed tax rules are established by the State Council Committee on Tariff Regulations, the Ministry of Finance, the State Taxation Administration, and the Customs Office. A few kinds of taxes are based on laws passed by the National People's Congress. China also has bilateral tax treaties with numerous other countries. If a domestic tax law conflicts with a tax treaty (for example, a tax treaty may provide more favorable terms for taxation of a foreign enterprise), then the tax treaty controls.

In the late 1950s, China abolished the personal income tax. It reinstated the personal income tax in 1980. In the years immediately following its re-implementation, the taxable income threshold was much higher than most people's income and therefore few people needed to pay income taxes until 1987.

Beginning with reform and opening up in 1978 and continuing through the early 1990s, China's fiscal policy focused on decentralization and reducing firms' tax burdens in order to improve economic growth.

In 1984 the State Council announced that China would begin collecting VAT. For a decade, it was imposed only on certain categories of goods and at differing rates.

The 1994 tax reform split taxes into three categories: central government taxes (like customs duties), local government taxes (like business taxes) and shared taxes (like VAT). It reduced the number of taxes from 37 to 23. VAT became universally imposed on production, wholesale, retail, and importation of all goods. The 1994 reform also created separate central and local tax authorities which were also separate from the Ministry of Finance or local finance departments. Tax revenues increased in the years following these reforms.

The Golden Tax Project was launched in 1994. It established a computerized database of tax records in an effort to improve the efficiency of tax collection, prevent tax evasion, and reduce corruption. Initially piloted with 50 cities, in 1998 the Golden Tax Project expanded to establish a network between local bureaus and the National Tax Administration. As an incentive for buyers to ask sellers for receipts to document VAT, each receipt was also a lottery ticket.

Rural taxes and fees were reformed beginning in 2000. On 1 January 2006, the agricultural tax was abolished. Taxes on animal husbandry were also abolished. These rural tax reforms increased the income of farmers and reduced rural inequality. The reforms also put pressure on the financing for lower levels of government.

Before 2002 tax reforms, corporate income tax was paid according to the administrative relationship of each company: central government-owned SOEs paid taxes to the central government, with local companies and local SOEs paying taxes to local governments. Under this arrangement, about 60% of corporate income tax was allocated to local governments. This incentivized local governments to create large local enterprises to generate local profits, and sometimes resulted in local protectionism, especially in highly profitable segments like liquor and tobacco.

After the 2002 tax reforms, corporate income tax was split with 60% to the central government and 40% to local governments, with some exemptions for special central SOEs.

After the Golden Tax Project Phase II was completed in 2003, the VAT invoicing system was made fully electronic. Through improved anti-counterfeiting, auditing, and inspection processes, the problem of false invoices declined and the amount of tax revenue collected from VAT increased significantly. The Golden Tax Project was further expanded in 2005 as the government built a more comprehensive records management system for tax collection.

Effective 1 January 2008, China merged the corporate tax rate for domestic firms and foreign firms at a rate of 25%. The exception was enterprises in high-tech and new technology industries, which were taxed at 15%.

In 2015, the State Administration of Taxation prohibited local tax authorities from inspecting e-commerce businesses.

In 2016, business tax was replaced with VAT nationwide.

In August 2018, the government amended the laws on individual income tax to allow for itemized deductions from taxable income, including for education expenses and medical expenses. The 2018 amendments also increased the threshold at which point income was taxable. The rationale was that these changes would reduce the tax burden on low income families and make the tax system fairer.

In 2019, the government reduced the amount of VAT in an effort to stimulate the economy.

In 2023, Chinese local governments' fiscal revenues will show a steady increase in proportion to support policies, sending a green light for national economic recovery. The rapid economic improvement resulting from the pandemic has laid the foundation for economic recovery beyond 2022. According to CAFS (the Chinese Academy of Fiscal Sciences) research, China's fiscal situation is expected to improve in 2023, indicating a brighter outlook for the country's local finances. All finance departments are taking many steps to ease the financial burden. The central government paid 10.6 trillion yuan to local governments to help them cope with fiscal decline due to tax and fee cuts. In addition, the central government requested local governments to reduce general spending, establish a mechanism to directly distribute budgets to lower-level governments, and strengthen monitoring of local financial management.

Starting from 2024, the Chinese government increased efforts to enforce taxation on wealthy citizens’ overseas income, which further expanded to regular citizens in 2025. The efforts included overseas income such as investment returns, dividends and employee stock options, with investment gains facing taxes as much as 20%. In 2026, efforts were increased to tax offshore trusts that hold shares in some Hong Kong-listed companies. These efforts increased the amount of personal tax gathered, with personal income tax revenue increasing 11.5% from 2024 to a record ¥1.62 trillion in 2025.

== Malware ==
Companies operating in China are required to use tax software from either Baiwang or Aisino (subsidiary of China Aerospace Science and Industry Corporation). Highly sophisticated malware has been found in products from both vendors. Both sets of malware allowed for the theft of corporate secrets and other industrial espionage.

=== GoldenSpy ===
GoldenSpy, malware which affords system-level access allowing an attacker nearly full control over an infected system, was discovered in 2020 inside Aisino's Intelligent Tax Software. It was discovered that the Intelligent Tax software's uninstall feature would leave the malware in place if used.

After GoldenSpy was discovered, its creators attempted to scrub it from infected systems in an attempt to cover their tracks. The uninstaller was delivered directly through the tax software. A second more sophisticated version of the uninstaller was later deployed as well.

The suspicious characteristics of GoldenSpy include: covert download, occurring two hours after the installation of the Intelligent Tax software; creation of two autostart services for monitoring and self-restart; uninstalling the tax software does not remove the GoldenSpy binaries; beaconing traffic to a domain unrelated to the tax software; and running with system-level privileges and allowing for remote code execution.

=== GoldenHelper ===
GoldenHelper was discovered after GoldenSpy and is an equally sophisticated malware program which was part of the Golden Tax Invoicing software from Baiwang, which is used by all companies in China to pay VAT. Though it was discovered after GoldenSpy, GoldenHelper had in fact been operating for longer. This discovery indicated that Chinese tax software had been harboring malware for much longer than suspected.

There are many techniques used by GoldenHelper operates in a number of ways: obfuscation by the random generation of file names during transfer, file system location randomization, random timestamping, algorithmic IP-based domain generation, UAC bypass to eliminate the need for user permissions for installation and elevation to system-level privileges, and more.

== Tax revenue over time ==
As of 2007, a paper reported that about two-thirds of tax revenue was spent at the local level and that "the ratio of central revenue to total tax revenues reached a low of 22 per cent in 1993, before rising to the 50 per cent level following the 1994 tax reform".

VAT's significance to tax revenues increased dramatically after its nationwide implementation replaced business tax in 2016.

China's tax revenue came to 11.05 trillion yuan (1.6 trillion U.S. dollars) in 2013, up 9.8 per cent over 2012. Tax revenue in 2015 was 12,488.9 billion yuan. In 2016, tax revenue was 13,035.4 billion yuan. Tax revenue in 2017 was 14,436 billion yuan. In 2018, tax revenue was 15,640.1 billion yuan, an increase of 1204.1 billion yuan over the previous year. Tax revenue in 2019 was 15799.2 billion yuan. In 2020 and 2021, the total tax revenues were respectively 15431 billion and 17273.1 billion Chinese yuan. The 2017 World Bank "Doing Business" rankings estimated that China's total tax rate for corporations was 68% as a percentage of profits through direct and indirect tax. As a percentage of GDP, according to the State Administration of Taxation, overall tax revenues were 30% in China.

Although China's corporate income tax rate is not high by international standards, its revenue from corporate income tax is large. As of at least 2022, revenue from corporate income tax has grown quickly.

== Historical views and practice ==
Business taxes were first levied in China during the Zhou dynasty (1046-256 BCE). The Zhou dynasty also collecting a form of personal property tax called chan bu.

Guan Zhong (723-645 BCE) wrote that because taxation would reduce the people's wealth and make them dislike the government, it was better to obtain revenue by monopolizing the sale of salt, iron, forest products, and ore.

Confucian thinking generally held that taxation should be low. Chinese historiography often attributes the collapse of dynasties to the imposition of heavy taxes and levies.

Mencius (372-289 BCE) favored low taxation of the people and stated that the rulers of the warring states were imposing taxes like brigands. His view was that the agricultural tax in place but abolish all other taxes. He particularly criticized market taxes, head taxes, and housing taxes. Mencius believed the ideal tax rate was 10%.

After defeating the other six kingdoms, the Qin dynasty maintained the high taxes it had imposed in war time and imposed taxes to fund projects including the Great Wall and the Terracotta Army. Taxes and levies equaled two-thirds of farmers' crops. Discontent with these policies contributed to rebellion and ultimately the defeat of the Qin and establishment of the Han dynasty.

During the Han dynasty, Emperor Wu (156-87 BCE) collected min qian (a form of business tax) from merchants, businessmen, and handicraftsmen.

In 9 CE, Emperor Wang Mang of the Xin dynasty (9 to 23 CE) established the first income tax through a 10% tax of net earnings from wild herb and fruit collection, fishing, shepherding, and various nonagricultural activities and forms of trading. People were obligated to report their taxes to the government and officials would audit these reports. The penalty for evading this tax was one year of hard labor and confiscation of the entirety of a person's property. Because it caused popular discontent, this income tax was abolished in 22 CE.

The Tang dynasty (618-907 CE) imposed yashui (a form of business tax) on intermediary agents. It also collected a form of housing property taxes.

Yashui was also an important source of local government revenue during the Qing dynasty (1644-1911). The Qing dynasty also collected a form of housing property taxes.

In 1853, the Qing introduced another form of business tax called lijin.

Personal income tax was implemented in the early 20th century. First, in 1911, the Qing drafted an income tax prospectus. However, the Qing collapsed before collecting any income tax. The Republic of China (ROC) implemented income tax in 1914, but suspended it in 1916. The ROC sought revised income tax regulations in 1928, planned for implementation in 1929, but then put the regulations on hold. The ROC established another income tax system in 1936 and it remained in place (with some revisions) until the ROC's defeat in the Chinese Civil War.

On 1 January 1931, the ROC replaced lijin with business tax. It collected housing property taxes in the form of a housing contribution (fang juan).

== See also ==
- State Administration of Taxation
- General Administration of Customs
- Ministry of Finance
- List of Chinese administrative divisions by tax revenues
- Tax-Sharing Reform of China in 1994
