= Regions of Tanzania =

Tanzania's Regions Mikoa ya Tanzania (Swahili)
- Category: Unitary republic
- Location: Tanzania
- Number: 31 (as of 29 January 2016)
- Populations: 115,588 (Unguja South) – 4,364,541 (Dar es Salaam)
- Areas: 230 km^{2} (89 sq mi) (Mjini Magharibi) – 76,151 km^{2} (29,402 sq mi) (Tabora)
- Government: Regional Government
- Subdivisions: Districts

Tanzania is administratively divided into thirty-one regions (mkoa).

== History ==
Current Map of the Regions of Tanzania

- In 1975, Tanzania had 25 regions. In the 1970s, the name of the Ziwa Magharibi Region (West Lake Region) changed to Kagera Region.
- In 2002, Manyara Region was created out of part of Arusha Region.
- In 2012, four regions were created: Geita, Katavi, Njombe, and Simiyu.
- In 2016, Songwe Region was created from the western part of Mbeya Region.

== List of regions ==
Tanzania is subdivided into 31 administrative regions.

Rank (Area)	Region	Capital	Districts	Area (km^{2})	Population (2022)	Rank (Population)	Postcode	Map
9	Arusha Region	Arusha	7	37,576 km^{2} (14,508 sq mi)	2,356,255	11	23xxx	
26	Dar es Salaam Region	Dar es Salaam	5	1,393 km^{2} (538 sq mi)	5,383,728	1	11xxx	
8	Dodoma Region	Dodoma	7	41,311 km^{2} (15,950 sq mi)	3,085,625	5	41xxx	
21	Geita Region	Geita	5	20,054 km^{2} (7,743 sq mi)	2,977,608	7	30xxx	
12	Iringa Region	Iringa	5	35,503 km^{2} (13,708 sq mi)	1,192,728	24	51xxx	
16	Kagera Region	Bukoba	8	25,265 km^{2} (9,755 sq mi)	2,989,299	6	35xxx	
6	Katavi Region	Mpanda	3	45,843 km^{2} (17,700 sq mi)	1,152,958	25	50xxx	
10	Kigoma Region	Kigoma	8	45,066 km^{2} (17,400 sq mi)	2,470,967	9	47xxx	
24	Kilimanjaro Region	Moshi	6	13,250 km^{2} (5,120 sq mi)	1,861,934	18	25xxx	
3	Lindi Region	Lindi	6	66,669 km^{2} (25,741 sq mi)	1,194,028	23	65xxx	
7	Manyara Region	Babati	6	44,522 km^{2} (17,190 sq mi)	1,892,502	17	27xxx	
19	Mara Region	Musoma	7	21,760 km^{2} (8,400 sq mi)	2,372,015	10	31xxx	
11	Mbeya Region	Mbeya	7	35,954 km^{2} (13,882 sq mi)	2,343,754	12	53xxx	
31	Mjini Magharibi Region (Zanzibar Urban West)	Zanzibar City	2	230 km^{2} (89 sq mi)	893,169	26	71xxx	
2	Morogoro Region	Morogoro	7	70,624 km^{2} (27,268 sq mi)	3,197,104	4	67xxx	
23	Mtwara Region	Mtwara	7	16,710 km^{2} (6,450 sq mi)	1,634,947	20	63xxx	
25	Mwanza Region	Mwanza	7	9,467 km^{2} (3,655 sq mi)	3,699,872	2	33xxx	
20	Njombe Region	Njombe	6	21,347 km^{2} (8,242 sq mi)	889,946	27	59xxx	
28	Pemba North Region	Wete	2	574 km^{2} (222 sq mi)	272,091	28	75xxx	
30	Pemba South Region	Chake-Chake	2	332 km^{2} (128 sq mi)	271,350	29	74xxx	
13	Pwani Region	Kibaha	7	32,547 km^{2} (12,566 sq mi)	2,024,947	15	61xxx	
18	Rukwa Region	Sumbawanga	4	22,792 km^{2} (8,800 sq mi)	1,540,519	21	55xxx	
4	Ruvuma Region	Songea	6	63,669 km^{2} (24,583 sq mi)	1,848,794	19	57xxx	
22	Shinyanga Region	Shinyanga	5	18,901 km^{2} (7,298 sq mi)	2,241,299	13	37xxx	
17	Simiyu Region	Bariadi	5	25,212 km^{2} (9,734 sq mi)	2,140,497	14	39xxx	
5	Singida Region	Singida	6	49,340 km^{2} (19,050 sq mi)	2,008,058	16	43xxx	
14	Songwe Region	Vwawa	5	27,656 km^{2} (10,678 sq mi)	1,344,687	22	53xxx	
1	Tabora Region	Tabora	7	76,151 km^{2} (29,402 sq mi)	3,391,679	3	45xxx	
15	Tanga Region	Tanga	11	26,667 km^{2} (10,296 sq mi)	2,615,597	8	21xxx	
29	Unguja North Region (Zanzibar North)	Mkokotoni	2	470 km^{2} (180 sq mi)	257,290	30	73xxx	
27	Unguja South Region (Zanzibar South)	Koani	2	854 km^{2} (330 sq mi)	195,873	31	72xxx	

== See also ==
- Districts of Tanzania
- List of regions of Tanzania by Human Development Index
- List of regions of Tanzania by GDP
- List of regions of Tanzania by poverty rate
- ISO 3166-2:TZ
