= List of German states by poverty rate =

This is a list of German states by poverty rate. The national poverty rate by the Federal Statistical Office of Germany and international poverty rate used by the World Bank is used in the following lists. The estimates therefore differ.

== List (national estimate) ==
Poverty rate of States according to the national estimate in 2019. Persons in poverty had less than 60 percent of the median income at their disposal (below 1,074 euros per month per person in 2019).

Rank	State	Poverty rate
1	Bremen	24.9%
2	Saxony-Anhalt	19.5%
3	Mecklenburg-Vorpommern	19.4%
4	Berlin	19.3%
5	North Rhine-Westphalia	18.5%
—	Eastern Germany	17.9%
6	Saxony	17.2%
7	Lower Saxony	17.1%
8	Thuringia	17.0%
8	Saarland	17.0%
10	Hesse	16.1%
—	Germany (average)	15.9%
11	Rhineland-Palatinate	15.6%
—	Western Germany	15.4%
12	Brandenburg	15.2%
13	Hamburg	15.0%
14	Schleswig-Holstein	14.5%
15	Baden-Württemberg	12.3%
16	Bavaria	11.9%

== List (international estimate) ==
Percent of population living on less than $2.15, $3.65 and $6.85 a day, international dollars (2017 PPP) as per the World Bank.

Percent of population living on less than poverty thresholds
State	$2.15	$3.65	$6.85	Year of estimate
Germany	0.0%	0.2%	0.2%	2019
Saarland	0.03%	0.03%	0.64%	2019
Mecklenburg-Vorpommern	0.01%	0.01%	0.49%	2019
Bremen	0.01%	0.01%	0.48%	2019
North Rhine-Westphalia	0.17%	0.24%	0.40%	2019
Berlin	0.21%	0.26%	0.34%	2019
Lower Saxony	0.12%	0.23%	0.33%	2019
Hamburg	0.24%	0.24%	0.27%	2019
Thuringia	0.08%	0.08%	0.25%	2019
Rhineland-Palatinate	0.10%	0.10%	0.22%	2019
Hesse	0.06%	0.08%	0.22%	2019
Bavaria	0.09%	0.11%	0.21%	2019
Baden-Württemberg	0.01%	0.03%	0.21%	2019
Saxony	0.00%	0.00%	0.15%	2019
Brandenburg	0.10%	0.11%	0.12%	2019
Schleswig-Holstein	0.00%	0.05%	0.06%	2019
Saxony-Anhalt	0.02%	0.03%	0.03%	2019
