= List of regions of Tanzania by poverty rate =

This is a list of regions of Mainland Tanzania by poverty rate as of 2018. The international poverty rate used by the World Bank is used in the following list. The estimates can therefore differ from other estimates, like the national poverty rate. The national poverty rate was estimated to be 25.7% in 2020.

== List ==
Percent of population living on less than $2.15, $3.65 and $6.85 a day, international dollars (2017 PPP) as per the World Bank.

Percent of population living on less than poverty thresholds
Region	$2.15	$3.65	$6.85	daily income per capita (2017 PPP $ mean)	Gini coefficient	Year of estimate
Tanzania	45.0%	74.3%	92.3%	3.29	0.400	2018
Rukwa	68.9%	92.6%	98.8%	1.98	0.306	2018
Kigoma	66.4%	90.5%	98.2%	2.22	0.375	2018
Geita	62.3%	86.6%	98.8%	2.27	0.321	2018
Simiyu	62.0%	88.4%	97.6%	2.40	0.340	2018
Tabora	60.9%	85.7%	95.3%	2.71	0.405	2018
Mwanza	59.5%	85.2%	95.8%	2.51	0.343	2018
Singida	58.2%	87.5%	99.1%	2.32	0.279	2018
Kagera	57.7%	84.5%	97.4%	2.32	0.345	2018
Shinyanga	57.5%	89.9%	98.9%	2.37	0.279	2018
Lindi	56.8%	82.9%	96.0%	2.62	0.337	2018
Katavi	52.8%	87.4%	98.1%	2.40	0.292	2018
Manyara	49.6%	80.1%	96.5%	2.84	0.349	2018
Mara	46.7%	81.2%	95.9%	2.90	0.342	2018
Dodoma	44.2%	75.5%	90.9%	3.17	0.357	2018
Songwe	43.2%	76.9%	94.5%	3.01	0.339	2018
Ruvuma	41.0%	68.7%	90.8%	3.23	0.356	2018
Iringa	41.2%	79.1%	96.6%	2.89	0.313	2018
Mtwara	39.4%	61.4%	92.4%	3.47	0.362	2018
Arusha	39.3%	71.4%	94.2%	3.75	0.439	2018
Tanga	38.3%	70.0%	92.3%	3.33	0.360	2018
Pwani	37.0%	60.6%	87.9%	3.87	0.412	2018
Morogoro	33.7%	68.4%	91.5%	3.52	0.352	2018
Njombe	32.2%	70.8%	91.6%	3.64	0.368	2018
Mbeya	32.1%	69.1%	94.3%	3.48	0.364	2018
Kilimanjaro	22.6%	60.5%	84.1%	4.38	0.378	2018
Dar Es Salaam	11.6%	38.1%	70.1%	6.64	0.430	2018
