= List of South African provinces by poverty rate =

This is a list of South African provinces by poverty rate as of 2014. The international poverty rate used by the World Bank is used in the following list. The estimates can therefore differ from other estimates, like the national poverty rate.

== List ==
Percent of population living on less than $2.15, $3.65 and $6.85 a day, international dollars (2017 PPP) as per the World Bank.

Percent of population living on less than poverty thresholds
Province	$2.15	$3.65	$6.85	Estimate year
South Africa	20.5%	40.0%	61.6%	2014
Eastern Cape	35.6%	59.1%	77.3%	2014
Limpopo	34.3%	56.9%	77.1%	2014
KwaZulu-Natal	28.1%	52.4%	73.1%	2014
North West	23.2%	46.9%	70.9%	2014
Mpumalanga	20.3%	42.4%	65.9%	2014
Northern Cape	20.3%	40.6%	66.8%	2014
Free State	16.3%	36.2%	62.5%	2014
Gauteng	6.9%	19.0%	40.9%	2014
Western Cape	6.8%	21.3%	43.8%	2014
