= List of Greek subdivisions by GDP =

This is a List of Greek subdivisions by their GDP, or gross domestic product. There are fourteen modern regions of Greece, instituted in 2011. Greece's overall GDP was €196 billion in 2023, which represents €21,301 per capita, 44th in the world.

The GDP per capita of the regions of Greece in 2008.

== Regions ==
Rank	Region	Total GDP (€ million)	Share %	Growth %	Per capita
1	Attica	€95,758	48.8	9.0	€29,732
2	Central Macedonia	€27,207	13.9	5.8	€16,982
3	Thessaly	€9,963	5.1	6.1	€16,286
4	Crete	€10,068	5.1	9.4	€18,345
5	Western Greece	€8,478	4.3	5.5	€15,210
6	Central Greece	€8,807	4.5	0.3	€18,469
7	Peloponnese	€8,755	4.5	4.0	€17,841
8	Eastern Macedonia and Thrace	€7,097	3.6	4.2	€13,840
9	South Aegean	€6,479	3.3	11.9	€21,610
10	Epirus	€3,934	2.0	7.3	€13,789
11	Western Macedonia	€3,510	1.8	-2.4	€15,543
12	Ionian Islands	€3,402	1.7	13.6	€19,502
13	North Aegean	€2,595	1.3	8.5	€13,136
14	Mount Athos	N/A	N/A	N/A	N/A
	Greece	€196,051	100.0	7.5	€21,301
	EU	€17,235,522	N/A	0.5	€38,100

== See also ==
- Economy of Greece
