= List of Indian states by child nutrition =

Child nutrition in India is a serious problem for the public administration. However India is on course to meet select child nutrition targets such as the target for stunting. In 2019, according to UNICEF report, malnutrition is the cause of 69% of deaths among children below 5 years in India.

== Rank ==
This is a list of states and union territories of India ranked by the percentage of underweight and overweight children, by the status of effective coverage of supplementary nutrition program for children, and by percentage of children living in households using iodized salt.

The figures come from the 2011 Evaluation Report on Integrated Child Development Services (ICDS) published by Planning Commission, Government of India and National Family Health Survey 4 and 5.

Key
Columns	Explanation
(1) & (2)	Children refers to the age group 0–59 months.
(3)	Effective coverage of supplementary nutrition programme as % of children recorded in delivery register (2011).
(4)	% Children age 6–59 months in households with iodized salt (2015–16).

1		2		State/ UT	3		4
% of underweight children		% of overweight children		State/ UT	Rank	Supplementary nutrition coverage as % of children	% children living in households using iodized salt
% change from (2015–16) to (2019–20)	NFHS-5 (2019–20)	% change from (2015–16) to (2019–20)	NFHS-5 (2019–20)	State/ UT	Rank	Supplementary nutrition coverage as % of children	% children living in households using iodized salt
▲ (0.7)	12.7	▲ (5.8)	10	Mizoram	1	69.8	98.9
▼ (2.3)	32.9	▲ (0.6)	3.2	Karnataka	2	67.5	86.6
▲ (4.4)	21	▲ (3.9)	9.6	Jammu and Kashmir	3	65.9	93.4
▲ (0.6)	32.2	▲ (2.2)	4.3	West Bengal	4	65.8	94.1
▲ (0.4)	39.7	▲ (2.0)	3.9	Gujarat	5	65.7	95.8
–	–	–	–	Chhattisgarh	6	65.1	99.3
–	–	–	–	Tamil Nadu	7	63.7	84
–	–	–	–	Jharkhand	8	63.6	97.6
▲ (3.6)	19.7	▲ (0.6)	4	Kerala	9	60.7	98.1
–	–	–	–	Odisha	10	58.8	92.7
▲ (0.2)	24	▼ (0.9)	2.8	Goa	11	58.7	97.9
▲ (0.1)	36.1	▲ (2.2)	4.1	Maharashtra	12	58.4	96.3
▼ (2.3)	26.6	▲ (0.1)	4	Meghalaya	13	57.5	99
▲ (1.5)	25.6	▲ (5.2)	8.2	Tripura	14	52.8	99.1
▼ (0.9)	13.1	▲ (0.8)	9.6	Sikkim	15	52.5	99.8
▲ (4.3)	25.5	▲ (3.8)	5.7	Himachal Pradesh	16	52.4	99
▼ (2.3)	29.6	–	–	Andhra Pradesh	17	47.2	81.4
–	–	–	–	Haryana	18	43.6	91
–	–	–	–	All India	**	41	93
–	–	–	–	Punjab	19	40.2	98.5
–	–	–	–	Madhya Pradesh	20	38.2	92.1
–	–	–	–	Rajasthan	21	33.4	92.1
–	–	–	–	Arunachal Pradesh	22	30.2	99.4
▼ (2.9)	41	▲ (1.2)	2.4	Bihar	23	29.4	93.1
–	–	▲ (1.5)	2.7	Uttarakhand	24	26.2	95.4
–	–	–	–	Uttar Pradesh	25	22.7	93.3
▼ (0.5)	13.3	▲ (0.3)	3.4	Manipur	26	21.6	99.4
▲ (10.2)	26.9	▲ (1.1)	4.9	Nagaland	27	19.8	99.4
▲ (3)	32.8	▲ (2.6)	4.9	Assam	28	5.9	99.6
▲ (3.4)	31.8	▲ (2.7)	3.4	Telangana	29		
–	–	–	–	Chandigarh	U/T	59.9	100
–	–	–	–	Dadra and Nagar Haveli	U/T	57.6	62.1
–	–	–	–	Daman and Diu	U/T	50.3	96.5
–	–	–	–	Puducherry	U/T	49.9	93.6
–	–	–	–	Delhi	U/T	49.7	98.2
▲ (2.1)	23.7	▲ (2.4)	5.4	Andaman and Nicobar Islands	U/T	–	98.9
▲ (2.2)	25.8	▲ (8.9)	10.5	Lakshadweep	U/T	–	95.8
▲ (1.7)	20.4	▲ (9.4)	13.4	Ladakh	U/T	–	–

== See also ==
- Obesity in India
- Malnutrition in India
- India State Hunger Index
- Health in India
