= Indian states ranking by safety of women =

This is a list of states and union territories of India ranked according to crime against women and rate of crime against women. The list is compiled from the 2016 and 2018 Crime in India Report published by National Crime Records Bureau (NCRB), Government of India.

As of 2016, Delhi is the least safe State/UT with the highest cognizable crime rate of 160.4 (per 100,000 persons). Nagaland has the lowest incidence of crime based on the percentage of share.

India ranks 128 out of 177 countries in the 'Women, Peace And Security Index 2023'.

== List ==
S.No	State/UT	Crime against Women (IPC + SLL)			Percentage Share of State/UT (2016)	Rank Based on Incidence / % share (2016)	Rate of Cognizable Crimes (2016)	Rank Based on Crime Rate (2016)	Rate of Total Crime against Women (2018) (Note: Crime rate is calculated as crime per one lakh of population.)
S.No	State/UT	2014	2016	2018	Percentage Share of State/UT (2016)	Rank Based on Incidence / % share (2016)	Rate of Cognizable Crimes (2016)	Rank Based on Crime Rate (2016)	Rate of Total Crime against Women (2018)
1	Andhra Pradesh	16526	16362	16438	4.8	8	63.5	9	63.2
2	Arunachal Pradesh	351	367	368	0.1	27	58.7	10	51.1
3	Assam	19169	20869	27728	6.2	6	131.3	2	166.0
4	Bihar	15393	13400	16920	4.0	12	26.6	29	29.8
5	Chhattisgarh	6301	5947	8587	1.8	16	45.9	18	60.5
6	Goa	508	371	362	0.1	26	40.5	20	47.6
7	Gujarat	10854	8532	8329	2.5	15	28.7	27	26.0
8	Haryana	9010	9839	14326	2.9	14	77.8	6	107.5
9	Himachal Pradesh	1529	1222	1633	0.4	22	35.2	24	45.6
10	Jammu and Kashmir	3327	2850	3437	0.8	20	47.8	16	54.0
11	Jharkhand	6086	5453	7083	1.6	17	33.2	25	39.2
12	Karnataka	14004	14131	13514	4.2	11	45.8	19	41.9
13	Kerala	11451	10034	10461	3.0	13	54.9	12	57.5
14	Madhya Pradesh	28756	26604	28942	7.8	5	71.1	8	73.5
15	Maharashtra	26818	31388	35497	9.3	3	54.6	13	60.9
16	Manipur	337	253	271	0.1	28	19.6	32	17.7
17	Meghalaya	390	372	571	0.1	25	27.0	28	35.7
18	Mizoram	258	120	249	0.0	30	23.2	30	42.2
19	Nagaland	68	105	75	0.0	32	9.2	36	7.3
20	Odisha	14651	17837	20274	5.3	7	84.5	3	91.3
21	Punjab	5481	5105	5302	1.5	18	38.0	22	37.7
22	Rajasthan	31216	27422	27866	8.1	4	78.3	5	75.1
23	Sikkim	111	153	172	0.0	29	50.3	15	55.5
24	Tamil Nadu	6354	4463	5822	1.3	19	12.9	34	15.4
25	Telangana	14147	15374	16027	4.5	9	83.7	4	87.1
26	Tripura	1618	1013	907	0.3	23	53.9	14	46.5
27	Uttar Pradesh	38918	49262	59691	14.5	1	47.5	17	55.7
28	Uttrakhand	1413	1588	2817	0.5	21	30.4	26	52.2
29	West Bengal	38	12	30	9.6	2	71.2	7	64.4
30	Andaman and Nicobar Islands	117	108	147	0.0	31	40.1	21	77.4
31	Chandigarh	434	414	442	0.1	24	56.7	11	83.4
32	Dadra and Nagar Haveli	21	28	38	0.0	35	14.4	33	17.3
33	Daman and Diu	16	41	16	0.0	34	37.3	23	12.3
34	Delhi	15319	15310	13640	4.5	10	160.4	1	149.6
35	Lakshwadeep	4	9	11	0.0	36	21.4	31	36.7
36	Pondicherry	77	95	166	0.0	33	12.8	35	21.6
