= List of Norwegian counties by GDP =

This is a list of Norwegian Counties by GDP and GDP per capita.

== List of Counties by GDP ==
Counties by GDP in 2021 according to data by the OECD.

Rank	County	GDP in mil. NOK	GDP in mil. USD (PPP)
1	Oslo	721 287	80 482
2	Viken	627 544	70 023
3	Vestland	371 125	41 411
4	Rogaland	320 980	35 815
5	Trøndelag	265 700	29 647
6	Vestfold og Telemark	208 058	23 216
7	Innlandet	181 298	20 230
8	Agder	156 694	17 484
9	Møre og Romsdal	145 277	16 210
10	Troms og Finnmark	134 145	14 968
11	Nordland	131 210	14 641
—	Norway - not regionalised	1 060 140	118 345
	Norway	4 323 931	482 472

== List of Counties by GDP per capita ==
Counties by GDP per capita (without not regionalised GDP) in 2021 according to data by the OECD.

Rank	County	GDP per capita in NOK	GDP per capita in USD (PPP)
1	Oslo	1 032 741	115 235
2	Rogaland	662 880	73 965
3	Vestland	579 828	64 698
4	Trøndelag	562 174	62 728
5	Troms og Finnmark	554 434	61 865
6	Møre og Romsdal	546 770	61 010
7	Nordland	546 093	60 934
8	Agder	505 480	56 402
9	Viken	497 731	55 538
10	Vestfold og Telemark	491 445	54 836
11	Innlandet	488 767	54 538
	Norway	799 496	89 209

== See also ==
- Economy of Norway
