= List of German states by Human Development Index =

Map of German states by HDI in 2023: > 0.959 0.959 – 0.940 0.939 – 0.920 < 0.919

This is a list of German states by Human Development Index (HDI) as of 2023.

Rank	State	HDI (2023)
Very high human development
1	Hamburg	0.977
2	Berlin	0.977
3	Baden-Württemberg	0.972
4	Bavaria	0.967
5	Hesse	0.963
6	Bremen	0.961
—	Germany (average)	0.959
7	North Rhine-Westphalia	0.955
8	Saxony	0.953
9	Rhineland-Palatinate	0.948
10	Lower Saxony	0.945
11	Saarland	0.944
12	Schleswig-Holstein	0.939
13	Thuringia	0.937
14	Brandenburg	0.936
15	Mecklenburg-Vorpommern	0.932
16	Saxony-Anhalt	0.930

== Development 1995–2015 ==
Human Development Index of German states since 1995.

State	HDI 1995	HDI 2000	HDI 2005	HDI 2010	HDI 2015	Increase 1995–2015
Hamburg	0.874	0.896	0.934	0.953	0.964	▲9.0%
Baden-Württemberg	0.847	0.872	0.905	0.926	0.941	▲9.4%
Bremen	0.853	0.879	0.910	0.930	0.938	▲8.5%
Hesse	0.849	0.875	0.908	0.926	0.935	▲8.6%
Bavaria	0.835	0.861	0.894	0.916	0.933	▲9.8%
Berlin	0.840	0.866	0.897	0.919	0.932	▲9.2%
North Rhine-Westphalia	0.834	0.860	0.891	0.910	0.924	▲9.0%
Saxony	0.830	0.855	0.887	0.904	0.916	▲8.6%
Rhineland-Palatinate	0.823	0.849	0.879	0.901	0.914	▲9.1%
Saarland	0.824	0.849	0.880	0.901	0.914	▲9.0%
Lower Saxony	0.819	0.844	0.875	0.896	0.912	▲9.3%
Schleswig-Holstein	0.820	0.846	0.877	0.893	0.907	▲8.7%
Thuringia	0.815	0.847	0.873	0.892	0.906	▲9.1%
Brandenburg	0.811	0.836	0.868	0.888	0.902	▲9.1%
Mecklenburg-Vorpommern	0.806	0.831	0.863	0.884	0.897	▲9.1%
Saxony-Anhalt	0.807	0.832	0.862	0.883	0.895	▲8.8%
Germany	0.834	0.860	0.892	0.912	0.926	▲9.2%

== See also ==
- List of countries by Human Development Index
