= List of regions of Tanzania by GDP =

This is a list of regions of Tanzania by GDP and GDP per capita. Data does only include values for Mainland Tanzania without Zanzibar.

== List of regions by GDP ==
Regions (2011 borders) by GDP in 2018 according to data by the National Bureau of Statistics (Tanzania).

TSh.763/139 per Int. dollar based on PPP (IMF Apr. 2019)
Rank	Region	GDP in TSh. million/=	GDP in US$ million (PPP)
1	Dar es Salaam	22,577,225	29,585
2	Mwanza Region	12,731,454	20,683
3	Shinyanga Region	7,540,589	9,881
4	Mbeya Region	7,314,302	9,584
5	Morogoro Region	6,191,343	8,113
6	Tanga Region	6,016,873	7,884
7	Arusha Region	5,999,901	7,862
8	Kilimanjaro Region	5,754,677	7,541
9	Kagera Region	4,928,135	6,458
10	Ruvuma Region	4,903,559	6,426
11	Tabora Region	4,715,065	6,179
12	Mara Region	4,620,797	6,055
13	Rukwa Region	4,497,293	5,893
14	Manyara Region	4,377,706	5,736
15	Dodoma Region	3,872,727	5,075
16	Iringa Region	3,643,062	4,774
17	Kigoma Region	3,625,727	4,751
18	Mtwara Region	3,552,506	4,655
19	Njombe Region	2,685,337	3,519
20	Lindi Region	2,529,877	3,315
21	Pwani Region	2,510,724	3,290
22	Singida Region	2,418,091	3,169
23	Songwe Region	2,357,383	3,089
	Tanzania (Mainland)	129,364,353	169,516

== List of regions by GDP per capita ==
Regions (2011 borders) by GDP per capita in 2018 according to data by the National Bureau of Statistics (Tanzania).

TSh.763/139 per Int. dollar based on PPP (IMF Apr. 2019)
Rank	Region	GDP per capita in TSh. /=	GDP per capita in US$ (PPP)
1	Dar es Salaam	4,348,990	5,699
2	Mbeya Region	3,506,101	4,594
3	Iringa Region	3,360,551	4,404
4	Njombe Region	3,317,698	4,347
5	Ruvuma Region	3,112,316	4,078
6	Kilimanjaro Region	3,074,583	4,029
7	Arusha Region	3,034,353	3,976
8	Lindi Region	2,604,254	3,413
9	Tanga Region	2,591,074	3,395
10	Mwanza Region	2,510,138	3,289
11	Manyara Region	2,483,070	3,254
12	Mtwara Region	2,471,341	3,238
13	Morogoro Region	2,392,177	3,135
14	Rukwa Region	2,325,640	3,047
15	Mara Region	2,137,826	2,801
16	Pwani Region	1,993,403	2,612
17	Songwe Region	1,969,023	2,580
18	Shinyanga Region	1,861,770	2,440
19	Tabora Region	1,667,808	2,185
20	Dodoma Region	1,520,720	1,993
21	Singida Region	1,500,190	1,966
22	Kigoma Region	1,384,819	1,815
23	Kagera Region	1,353,277	1,773
	Tanzania (Mainland)	2,458,496	3,222

== See also ==
- Economy of Tanzania
