= List of German states by unemployment rate =

This is a list of German states by unemployment rate as of August 2025 according to the Federal Statistical Office of Germany.

Rank	State	Unemployment rate (November 2025)
1	Bremen	11.8%
2	Berlin	10.5%
3	Hamburg	8.5%
4	Mecklenburg-Vorpommern	8.0%
4	Saxony-Anhalt	8.0%
4	North Rhine-Westphalia	8.0%
–	Eastern Germany	7.9%
7	Saarland	7.6%
8	Saxony	7.0%
9	Brandenburg	6.5%
10	Thuringia	6.4%
11	Lower Saxony	6.2%
–	Western Germany	6.1%
12	Hesse	6.0%
13	Schleswig-Holstein	5.9%
14	Rhineland-Palatinate	5.6%
15	Baden-Württemberg	4.7%
16	Bavaria	4.2%
	Germany	6.4%
