= List of Swedish counties by fertility rate =

This is a list of Swedish counties by fertility rate as of 2020 according to the Statistics Sweden.

Rank	Counties	1980	1990	2000	2010	2020
1	Kronoberg				2.03	1.90
2	Jönköping				2.10	1.86
3	Kalmar				1.99	1.85
4	Dalarna				2.03	1.82
5	Halland				2.18	1.78
6	Södermanland				2.07	1.77
7	Västmanland				2.01	1.75
8	Blekinge				1.99	1.73
9	Västernorrland				2.02	1.71
10	Gävleborg				2.00	1.69
10	Örebro				1.99	1.69
12	Jämtland				2.10	1.67
12	Norrbotten				1.95	1.67
12	Värmland				1.95	1.67
15	Skåne				1.95	1.66
16	Västra Götaland				1.99	1.65
17	Västerbotten				1.83	1.64
18	Östergötland	1.75	2.18	1.53	1.95	1.62
19	Stockholm	1.60	1.98	1.54	1.98	1.59
20	Uppsala				1.87	1.50
21	Gotland				2.05	1.46
	Sweden		2.13		1.98	1.66
