= List of Portuguese administrative divisions by GDP =

This is a list of Portuguese administrative divisions by GDP and GDP per capita.

== List of administrative divisions by GDP ==
Administrative divisions by nominal GDP in 2024 according to data by the National Institute for Statistics (INE).

=== Regions ===
Rank	Region	GDP in euros €	% of GDP	GDP per capita	
Rank	Region	GDP in euros €	% of GDP	In euros €	As % of Portugal average
1	Greater Lisbon	90,685,940,000	31.3%	42,345	156.5%
2	North Region	85,749,418,000	29.6%	23,280	86.0%
3	Centro Region	39,654,182,000	13.7%	23,236	85.9%
4	West and Tagus Valley	18,226,562,000	6.3%	21,220	78.4%
5	Setúbal Peninsula	15,320,170,000	5.3%	18,205	67.3%
6	Algarve Region	14,312,161,000	4.9%	29,302	108.3%
7	Alentejo Region	12,035,392,000	4.2%	25,348	93.7%
8	Autonomous Region of Madeira	7,486,003,000	2.6%	29,012	107.2%
9	Autonomous Region of the Azores	5,753,263,000	2.0%	23,836	88.1%
Portugal		289,427,973,000	100.0%	27,063	100.0%

=== Sub-regions ===
Rank	Sub-region	GDP in euros €	% of GDP	GDP per capita	
Rank	Sub-region	GDP in euros €	% of GDP	In euros €	As % of Portugal average
1	Greater Lisbon	90,685,940,000	31.3%	42,345	156.5%
2	Porto Metropolitan Area	46,966,659,000	16.2%	25,942	95.9%
3	Setúbal Peninsula	15,320,170,000	5.3%	18,205	67.3%
4	Algarve	14,312,161,000	4.9%	29,302	108.3%
5	Coimbra Region	10,587,474,000	3.7%	23,540	87.0%
6	Aveiro Region	9,962,242,000	3.4%	25,645	94.8%
7	Cávado	9,935,971,000	3.4%	23,030	85.1%
8	Ave	9,356,085,000	3.2%	22,126	81.8%
9	Oeste	8,049,413,000	2.8%	20,538	75.9%
10	Leiria Region	7,655,451,000	2.6%	25,561	94.4%
11	Autonomous Region of Madeira	7,486,003,000	2.6%	29,012	107.2%
12	Tâmega and Sousa	7,138,441,000	2.5%	17,444	64.5%
13	Autonomous Region of the Azores	5,753,263,000	2.0%	23,836	88.1%
14	Lezíria do Tejo	5,575,136,000	1.9%	22,339	82.5%
15	Viseu Dão Lafões	5,363,347,000	1.9%	20,772	76.8%
16	Alto Minho	4,967,020,000	1.7%	21,188	78.3%
17	Médio Tejo	4,602,014,000	1.6%	21,164	78.2%
18	Beiras and Serra da Estrela	3,958,851,000	1.4%	18,827	69.6%
19	Douro	3,781,338,000	1.3%	20,547	75.9%
20	Alentejo Central	3,554,518,000	1.2%	23,164	85.6%
21	Baixo Alentejo	3,154,756,000	1.1%	27,262	100.7%
22	Alentejo Litoral	3,127,632,000	1.1%	30,722	113.5%
23	Alto Alentejo	2,198,486,000	0.8%	19,321	71.4%
24	Beira Baixa	2,126,817,000	0.7%	21,187	78.3%
25	Terras de Trás-os-Montes	2,074,736,000	0.7%	18,632	68.8%
26	Alto Tâmega	1,529,167,000	0.5%	18,301	65.6%
Portugal		289,427,973,000	100.0%	27,063	100.0%

== See also ==
- Economy of Portugal
