= List of Brazilian states by poverty rate =

This is a list of Brazilian states by poverty rate as of 2021. The international poverty rate used by the World Bank is used in the following list. The estimates can therefore differ from other estimates, like the national poverty rate. The national poverty rate was estimated to be 29.6% in 2021 (monthly per capita income of under 497 Brazilian real).

== List ==
Percent of population living on less than $2.15, $3.65 and $6.85 a day, international dollars (2017 PPP) as per the World Bank.

Percent of population living on less than poverty thresholds
State	$2.15	$3.65	$6.85	daily income per capita (2017 PPP $)	Gini coefficient	Year of estimate
Brazil	5.8%	11.3%	28.4%	19.18	0.530	2021
Maranhão	14.6%	27.3%	54.0%	9.72	0.502	2021
Paraíba	12.2%	21.5%	46.1%	12.49	0.541	2021
Pernambuco	12.4%	23.2%	48.0%	12.24	0.551	2021
Alagoas	11.5%	21.8%	49.8%	10.98	0.509	2021
Acre	11.2%	20.0%	43.7%	13.16	0.520	2021
Ceará	11.0%	20.7%	44.3%	12.69	0.527	2021
Bahia	10.6%	20.1%	44.4%	12.62	0.522	2021
Piauí	10.2%	19.9%	41.1%	12.66	0.499	2021
Amazonas	10.0%	22.3%	48.7%	11.73	0.521	2021
Sergipe	9.9%	19.7%	46.0%	13.21	0.545	2021
Pará	9.5%	19.6%	44.5%	12.19	0.509	2021
Rio Grande do Norte	8.4%	18.5%	41.1%	15.67	0.564	2021
Roraima	8.1%	20.6%	47.2%	14.26	0.577	2021
Amapá	7.1%	15.7%	48.3%	12.40	0.519	2021
Rondônia	5.8%	9.7%	30.3%	14.70	0.446	2021
Espírito Santo	4.9%	9.4%	26.2%	18.30	0.498	2021
Rio de Janeiro	4.8%	8.5%	22.0%	24.00	0.549	2021
Tocantins	4.6%	9.3%	32.0%	15.27	0.495	2021
Distrito Federal	3.6%	6.2%	18.0%	32.47	0.560	2021
Minas Gerais	3.5%	7.0%	22.9%	18.72	0.477	2021
São Paulo	2.9%	5.6%	17.8%	25.01	0.523	2021
Mato Grosso do Sul	2.8%	5.6%	22.4%	20.07	0.492	2021
Paraná	2.4%	4.5%	16.6%	21.67	0.467	2021
Goiás	2.2%	6.1%	23.1%	17.90	0.457	2021
Mato Grosso	2.2%	5.6%	20.7%	18.49	0.455	2021
Rio Grande do Sul	1.7%	3.1%	11.4%	25.83	0.461	2021
Santa Catarina	1.5%	3.1%	9.8%	23.95	0.422	2021
