= Indian states ranking by incidents of human trafficking =

This is a list of states and union territories of India ranked by incidents of human trafficking as of 2016, and is based on the number of convicted cases. The list is compiled from the '2016 Crime in India Report' published by National Crime Records Bureau (NCRB), Government of India.

According to the report, the top three states with highest number of human trafficking incidents based on number of cases reported are West Bengal, Rajasthan and Gujarat and the top three states with highest number of human trafficking incidents based on crime rates are West Bengal, Daman and Diu and Goa.

== States and union territories ==
S.No	State	Cases reported (Note: Cases reported includes cases under sections 370, 370A of Chapter XVI of the Indian Penal Code, as well as cases under IPC sections 363A,366A, 366B, 367, 372 and 373)	Percentage share of state	Rank based on case reported	Crime Rate	Rank based on crime rate
1	Andhra Pradesh	239	2.94	7	0.46	9
2	Arunachal Pradesh	2	0.02	26	0.15	21
3	Assam	91	1.12	10	0.28	13
4	Bihar	43	0.53	17	0.04	29
5	Chhattisgarh	68	0.84	13	0.26	14
6	Goa	40	0.49	18	2.01	3
7	Gujarat	548	4.90	3	0.87	5
8	Haryana	51	0.63	15	0.18	18
9	Himachal Pradesh	8	0.10	22	0.11	23
10	Jammu and Kashmir	0	0.00		0.00	
11	Jharkhand	109	1.34	9	0.32	11
12	Karnataka	404	4.97	6	0.65	6
13	Kerala	21	0.26	19	0.06	26
14	Madhya Pradesh	51	0.63	16	0.07	25
15	Maharashtra	517	6.36	4	0.43	10
16	Manipur	3	0.04	25	0.12	22
17	Meghalaya	7	0.09	23	0.25	15
18	Mizoram	2	0.02	27	0.19	17
19	Nagaland	0	0.00		0.00	
20	Odisha	84	1.03	11	0.20	16
21	Punjab	13	0.16	20	0.04	28
22	Rajasthan	1422	17.49	2	1.94	4
23	Sikkim	1	0.01	29	0.15	20
24	Tamil Nadu	434	5.34	5	0.62	7
25	Telangana	229	2.82	8	0.62	8
26	Tripura	0	0.00		0.00	
27	Uttar Pradesh	79	0.97	12	0.04	30
28	Uttarakhand	12	0.15	21	0.11	24
29	West Bengal	53		11	0.04	11
30	Andaman and Nicobar Islands	1	0.0	28	0.18	19
31	Chandigarh	1	0.0	30	0.06	27
32	Dadra and Nagar Haveli	0	0.00		0.00	
33	Daman and Diu	7	0.1	24	2.12	2
34	Delhi	66	0.8	14	0.31	12
35	Lakshwadeep	0	0.00		0.00	
36	Puducherry	0	0.00		0.00	
