= States of Germany =

First-level administrative subdivisions of Germany

German states Deutsche Länder (German)
- Category: Federated state
- Location: Germany
- Number: 16
- Populations: 682,986 (Bremen) – 17,932,651 (NRW)
- Areas: 419.4 km^{2} (161.92 sq mi) (Bremen) – 70,549.4 km^{2} (27,239.29 sq mi) (Bavaria)
- Government: State government
- Subdivisions: Governmental district, district, Amt, municipality

The Federal Republic of Germany is a federation and consists of sixteen partly sovereign "states" (German: Länder, sing. Land). (Note: Pronunciation: Länder: [lɛndɐ]; Land: [lant]; Colloquially also (sing.) Bundesland [ˈbʊndəsˌlant] /(pl.) Bundesländer [ˈbʊndəsˌlɛndɐ], "Federate State/s")) Of the 16 states, 13 are so-called "area-states" (Flächenländer); in these, below the level of the state government, there is a division into local authorities (counties and county-level cities) that have their own administration. Two states, Berlin and Hamburg, are city-states, in which there is no separation between state government and local administration. The state of Bremen is a special case: the state consists of the cities of Bremen, for which the state government also serves as the municipal administration, and Bremerhaven, which has its own local administration separate from the state government. It is therefore a mixture of a city-state and an area-state. Three states, Bavaria, Saxony, and Thuringia, use the appellation Freistaat ("free state"); this title is merely stylistic and carries no legal or political significance (similar to the US states that call themselves a commonwealth).

The Federal Republic of Germany ("West Germany") was created in 1949 through the unification of the three western zones previously under American, British, and French administration in the aftermath of World War II. Initially, the states of the Federal Republic were Baden (until 1952), Bavaria (Bayern), Bremen, Hamburg, Hesse (Hessen), Lower Saxony (Niedersachsen), North Rhine-Westphalia (Nordrhein-Westfalen), Rhineland-Palatinate (Rheinland-Pfalz), Schleswig-Holstein, Württemberg-Baden (until 1952), and Württemberg-Hohenzollern (until 1952). West Berlin, while still under occupation by the Western Allies, viewed itself as part of the Federal Republic and was largely integrated and considered a de facto state. In 1952, following a referendum, Baden, Württemberg-Baden, and Württemberg-Hohenzollern merged into Baden-Württemberg. In 1957, the Saar Protectorate joined the Federal Republic as the state of Saarland.

The next major change occurred with German reunification in 1990, in which the territory of the former German Democratic Republic (East Germany) became part of the Federal Republic, by accession of the re-established eastern states of Brandenburg, Mecklenburg-West Pomerania (Mecklenburg-Vorpommern), Saxony (Sachsen), Saxony-Anhalt (Sachsen-Anhalt), and Thuringia (Thüringen), and the reunification of West and East Berlin into a city state. A referendum in 1996 to merge Berlin with surrounding Brandenburg failed to reach the necessary majority vote in Brandenburg, while a majority of Berliners voted in favour.

== States ==
It was the individual states that formed the Federal Republic of Germany in 1949. This contrasted with post-war developments in Austria, where the national federation (Bund) was established first, and the individual states were subsequently defined as units within that federal framework.

The German use of the term Länder ("lands") dates back to the Weimar Constitution of 1919. Previously, the states of the German Empire had been called Staaten ("states"). Today, it is common to use the term Bundesland (federated Land). Officially, the term "Bundesland" appears in neither the 1919 constitution nor the current one. Three Länder call themselves Freistaaten ("free states", an older German term for "republic"): Bavaria (since 1919), Saxony (originally from 1919 and again since 1990), and Thuringia (since 1994). Of the 17 states at the end of the Weimar Republic, six still exist (though partly with different borders):

- Bavaria (The geographically distinct Palatinate, which was part of Bavaria, 1816–1946, is now part of Rheinland Pfalz).
- Bremen
- Hamburg
- Hesse
- Saxony
- Thuringia

The other 11 states of the Weimar Republic either merged into one another or were separated into smaller entities:

- Anhalt is now part of the state of Saxony-Anhalt.
- Baden is now part of Baden-Württemberg.
- Braunschweig is now part of Lower Saxony.
- Lippe is now part of North Rhine-Westphalia.
- Lübeck is now part of Schleswig-Holstein.
- Mecklenburg-Schwerin and Mecklenburg-Strelitz are now parts of Mecklenburg-Vorpommern.
- Oldenburg is now part of Lower Saxony, with its former exclaves now belonging to their neighbouring states of Rhineland-Palatinate and Schleswig-Holstein.
- Prussia was divided among the states of Berlin, Brandenburg, Lower Saxony, North Rhine-Westphalia, Rhineland-Palatinate, Saxony-Anhalt and Schleswig-Holstein. The erstwhile Prussian provinces of Brandenburg, Saxony, Schleswig-Holstein and Hanover formed the core of the states of Brandenburg, Saxony-Anhalt, Schleswig-Holstein and Lower Saxony, respectively. The Prussian provinces of Westphalia and Rhineland contributed most territory to the state of North Rhine-Westphalia, and Rhineland province contributed about half of the territory of the state of Rhineland Palatinate. Most of the Prussian province of Hesse-Nassau was merged with the existing state of Hesse.
  Some territories bordering other states were annexed to the bordering state. Also, Prussia had exclaves that were surrounded by other states. These became part of their surrounding states. All states, except Bavaria, now have territory of the former Free State of Prussia. Other former Prussian territories lying east of the rivers Neisse and Oder were lost in 1945 and are now part of Poland or Russia. They are Silesia (Upper and Lower), Pomerania, West Prussia-Posen, and East Prussia respectively.
- Schaumburg-Lippe is now part of Lower Saxony.
- Württemberg is now part of Baden-Württemberg.

Possible boundary changes between states continue to be debated in Germany, in contrast to how there are "significant differences among the American states and regional governments in other federations without serious calls for territorial changes" in those other countries. Arthur B. Gunlicks summarizes the main arguments for boundary reform in Germany: "the German system of dual federalism requires strong Länder that have the administrative and fiscal capacity to implement legislation and pay for it from own source revenues. Too many Länder also make coordination among them and with the federation more complicated." But several proposals have failed so far; territorial reform remains a controversial topic in German politics and public perception.

A state capital is called a Landeshauptstadt.

=== List ===
State	State code	Since	Capital	Legislature	Head of state and government (Minister-President or Mayor)	Bundesrat votes	Area (km^{2})	Pop. (2023-12-31)	Pop. per km^{2}	HDI (2022)	GDP per capita (€; 2023)
Baden-Württemberg	BW	1952	Stuttgart	Landtag	Cem Özdemir (Greens)	6	35,748	11,230,740	314.2	0.963	54,339
Bavaria (Bayern)	BY	1949	Munich (München)	Landtag	Markus Söder (CSU)	6	70,541	13,176,426	186.8	0.958	57,343
Berlin	BE	1990	–	Abgeordnetenhaus	Kai Wegner (CDU)	4	891.1	3,662,381	4,110	0.967	51,209
Brandenburg	BB	1990	Potsdam	Landtag	Dietmar Woidke (SPD)	4	29,654	2,554,464	86.14	0.926	37,814
Bremen	HB	1949	Bremen	Bürgerschaft	Andreas Bovenschulte (SPD)	3	419.4	702,655	1,676	0.954	56,981
Hamburg	HH	1949	–	Bürgerschaft	Peter Tschentscher (SPD)	3	755.1	1,851,596	2,452	0.975	79,167
Hesse (Hessen)	HE	1949	Wiesbaden	Landtag	Boris Rhein (CDU)	5	21,116	6,267,546	296.8	0.954	54,806
Lower Saxony (Niedersachsen)	NI	1949	Hanover (Hannover)	Landtag	Olaf Lies (SPD)	6	47,710	8,008,135	167.9	0.936	44,531
Mecklenburg-Vorpommern (Mecklenburg–Western Pomerania)	MV	1990	Schwerin	Landtag	Manuela Schwesig (SPD)	3	23,295	1,578,041	67.74	0.922	36,335
North Rhine-Westphalia (Nordrhein-Westfalen)	NW	1949	Düsseldorf	Landtag	Hendrik Wüst (CDU)	6	34,112	18,017,520	528.2	0.946	46,194
Rhineland-Palatinate (Rheinland-Pfalz)	RP	1949	Mainz	Landtag	Gordon Schnieder (CDU)	4	19,858	4,125,163	207.7	0.938	41,797
Saarland	SL	1957	Saarbrücken	Landtag	Anke Rehlinger (SPD)	3	2,572	1,014,047	394.3	0.934	41,617
Saxony (Sachsen)	SN	1990	Dresden	Landtag	Michael Kretschmer (CDU)	4	18,450	4,054,689	219.8	0.944	38,143
Saxony-Anhalt (Sachsen-Anhalt)	ST	1990	Magdeburg	Landtag	Sven Schulze (CDU)	4	20,464	2,144,570	104.8	0.921	35,911
Schleswig-Holstein	SH	1949	Kiel	Landtag	Daniel Günther (CDU)	4	15,804	2,953,202	186.9	0.929	40,090
Thuringia (Thüringen)	TH	1990	Erfurt	Landtag	Mario Voigt (CDU)	4	16,202	2,114,870	130.5	0.928	35,715

== History ==
The Kingdom of Prussia (light gray) within the German Empire (1871–1918)

The states of the Weimar Republic in 1925, with the Free State of Prussia as the largest

Federalism has a long tradition in German history. Until the early 19th century, the majority of the territory that later became Germany was part of the Holy Roman Empire, which in 1796 was made up of more than 300 individual political entities subject to the Holy Roman Emperor in Vienna. The number of states was greatly reduced during the Napoleonic Wars (1796–1814), and the Empire itself was abolished in 1806. The Congress of Vienna, which restructured Europe after the wars, created the highly federalized 39-state German Confederation in 1815. The Confederation was dissolved after the Austro-Prussian War (1866) in which Prussia defeated the Austrian Empire and effectively excluded it from taking part in the eventual unification of Germany.

Following the war, the states of northern and central Germany united under the leadership of the Kingdom of Prussia to form the federal North German Confederation. During the Franco-Prussian War (1870–1871), the four southern German states of Bavaria, Württemberg, Baden and Hesse-Darmstadt joined the North German Confederation, which was rechristened the German Empire with Prussia's victory. The Reichstag and Federal Council (Bundesrat) gave the Prussian king the title of German Emperor (as of 1 January 1871). With only relatively minor changes that did not affect its federalized nature, the North German Constitution became the imperial constitution. The new German Empire included 25 states (three of them free cities) plus the imperial territory of Alsace–Lorraine, which had been won from France in the war. Within the empire, 65% of the territory and 62% of the population belonged to Prussia.

The Treaty of Versailles at the end of World War I stripped the former German Empire of 12 to 13 percent of its land area and population, the majority of it from Prussia. Only Alsace–Lorraine, which had never attained full statehood, was wholly lost to Germany. The new Weimar Republic remained federal in nature, with a total of 17 states. Seven small states in east-central Germany consolidated into Thuringia in 1920, Coburg chose to merge into Bavaria (also in 1920), and Prussia absorbed Pyrmont and Waldeck (1921 and 1929). During the Weimar period, there were a number of unsuccessful proposals to make radical changes to Germany's state structure, seven short-lived unrecognized states, four of them self-declared soviet republics during the German revolution of 1918–1919, plus two separatist republics in the Rhineland in 1923/24.

After the Nazi Party seized power in January 1933, the states were gradually abolished and reduced to provinces under the Nazi regime via the Gleichschaltung process, as the states administratively were largely superseded by the Nazi Gau system. Three changes are of particular note: on 1 January 1934, Mecklenburg-Schwerin was united with neighbouring Mecklenburg-Strelitz; and, by the Greater Hamburg Act (Groß-Hamburg-Gesetz) of 1937, the territory of the city-state was extended, while Lübeck lost its independence and became part of the Prussian province of Schleswig-Holstein.

=== West Germany, 1945–1990 ===
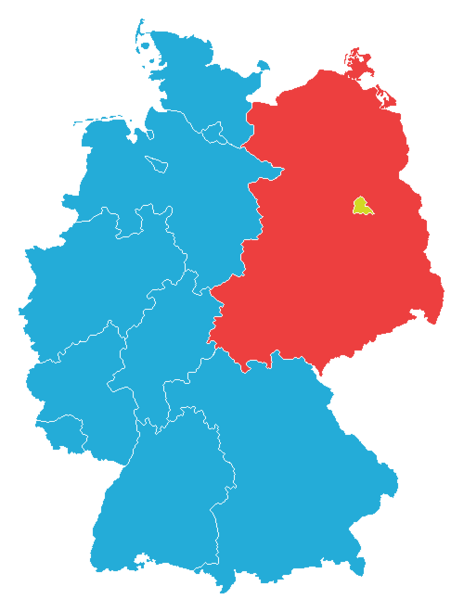
West Germany (blue) and East Germany (red) and West Berlin (yellow)

During the Allied occupation of Germany after World War II, internal borders were redrawn by the Allied military governments. New states were established in all four zones of occupation: Bremen, Hesse, Württemberg-Baden, and Bavaria in the American zone; Hamburg, Schleswig-Holstein, Lower Saxony, and North Rhine-Westphalia in the British zone; Rhineland-Palatinate, Baden, Württemberg-Hohenzollern and the Saarland – which later received a special status – in the French zone; Mecklenburg(-Vorpommern), Brandenburg, Saxony, Saxony-Anhalt, and Thuringia in the Soviet zone. No single state comprised more than 30% of either population or territory; this was intended to prevent any one state from being as dominant within Germany as Prussia had been in the past. Initially, only seven of the pre-War states remained: Baden (in part), Bavaria (reduced in size), Bremen, Hamburg, Hesse (enlarged), Saxony, and Thuringia. The states with hyphenated names, such as Rhineland-Palatinate, North Rhine-Westphalia, and Saxony-Anhalt, owed their existence to the occupation powers and were created out of mergers of former Prussian provinces and smaller states.

Former German territory that lay east of the Oder-Neisse line fell under either Polish or Soviet administration but attempts were made at least symbolically not to abandon sovereignty well into the 1960s. The former provinces of Farther Pomerania, East Prussia, Silesia and Posen-West Prussia fell under Polish administration with the Soviet Union taking the area around Königsberg (now Kaliningrad), pending a final peace conference with Germany which eventually never took place. More than 8 million Germans had been expelled from these territories that had formed part of the German-speaking lands for centuries and which mostly did not have sizable Polish minorities before 1945. However, no attempts were made to establish new states in these territories, as they lay outside the jurisdiction of West Germany at that time.

In 1948, the military governors of the three Western Allies handed over the so-called Frankfurt Documents to the minister-presidents in the Western occupation zones. Among other things, they recommended revising the boundaries of the West German states in a way that none of them should be too large or too small in comparison with the others.

As the premiers did not come to an agreement on this question, the Parliamentary Council was supposed to address this issue. Its provisions are reflected in Article 29 of the Basic Law. There was a binding provision for a new delimitation of the federal territory: the Federal Territory must be revised (paragraph 1). Moreover, in territories or parts of territories whose affiliation with a Land had changed after 8 May 1945 without a referendum, people were allowed to petition for a revision of the current status within a year after the promulgation of the Basic Law (paragraph 2). If at least one tenth of those entitled to vote in Bundestag elections were in favour of a revision, the federal government had to include the proposal into its legislation. Then a referendum was required in each territory or part of a territory whose affiliation was to be changed (paragraph 3). The proposal should not take effect if within any of the affected territories a majority rejected the change. In this case, the bill had to be introduced again and after passing had to be confirmed by referendum in the Federal Republic as a whole (paragraph 4). The reorganization should be completed within three years after the Basic Law had come into force (paragraph 6). Article 29 states that "the division of the federal territory into Länder may be revised to ensure that each Land be of a size and capacity to perform its functions effectively".

In their letter to Konrad Adenauer, the three western military governors approved the Basic Law but suspended Article 29 until such time as a peace treaty should be concluded. Only the special arrangement for the southwest under Article 118 could enter into force.

Upon its founding in 1949, West Germany thus had eleven states. These were reduced to nine in 1952 when three south-western states (South Baden, Württemberg-Hohenzollern, and Württemberg-Baden) merged to form Baden-Württemberg. From 1957, when the French-occupied Saar Protectorate was returned and formed into the Saarland, the Federal Republic consisted of ten states, which are referred to as the "Old States" today. West Berlin was under the sovereignty of the Western Allies and neither a Western German state nor part of one. However, it was in many ways integrated with West Germany under a special status.

A new delimitation of the federal territory has been discussed since the Federal Republic was founded in 1949 and even before. Committees and expert commissions advocated a reduction of the number of states; academics (Werner Rutz, Meinhard Miegel, Adrian Ottnad, etc.) and politicians (Walter Döring, Hans Apel, and others) made proposals – some of them far-reaching – for redrawing boundaries but hardly anything came of these public discussions. Territorial reform is sometimes propagated by the richer states as a means to avoid or reduce fiscal transfers.

==== Establishment of Baden-Württemberg ====
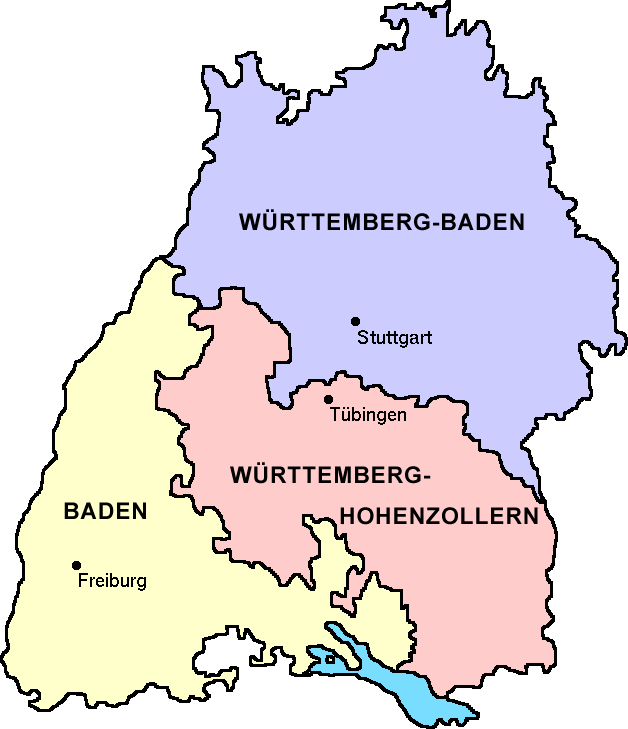
The three states that merged to form Baden-Württemberg in 1952

In southwestern Germany, territorial revision seemed to be a top priority since the border between the French and American occupation zones was set along the Autobahn Karlsruhe-Stuttgart-Ulm (today the A8). Article 118 stated "The division of the territory comprising Baden, Württemberg-Baden and Württemberg-Hohenzollern into Länder may be revised, without regard to the provisions of Article 29, by agreement between the Länder concerned. If no agreement is reached, the revision shall be effected by a federal law, which shall provide for an advisory referendum." Since no agreement was reached, a referendum was held on 9 December 1951 in four different voting districts, three of which approved the merger (South Baden refused but was overruled, as the result of total votes was decisive). On 25 April 1952, the three former states merged to form Baden-Württemberg.

==== Petitions to reconstitute former states ====
With the Paris Agreements in 1954, West Germany regained (limited) sovereignty. This triggered the start of the one-year period as set in paragraph 2 of Article 29. As a consequence, eight petitions for referendums were launched, six of which were successful:

- Reconstitution of the Free State of Oldenburg 12.9%
- Reconstitution of the Free State of Schaumburg-Lippe 15.3%
- Integration of Koblenz and Trier into North Rhine-Westphalia 14.2%
- Reintegration of Rheinhessen into Hesse 25.3%
- Reintegration of Montabaur into Hesse 20.2%
- Reconstitution of Baden 15.1%

The last petition was originally rejected by the Federal Minister of the Interior by reference to the referendum of 1951. However, the Federal Constitutional Court of Germany ruled that the rejection was unlawful: the population of Baden had the right to a new referendum because the one of 1951 had taken place under different rules from the ones provided for by article 29. In particular, the outcome of the 1951 referendum did not reflect the wishes of the majority of Baden's population.

The two Palatine petitions (for a reintegration into Bavaria and integration into Baden-Württemberg) failed with 7.6% and 9.3%. Further requests for petitions (Lübeck, Geesthacht, Lindau, Achberg, and 62 Hessian communities) had already been rejected as inadmissible by the Federal Minister of the Interior or were withdrawn as in the case of Lindau. The rejection was confirmed by the Federal Constitutional Court in the case of Lübeck.

==== Saar: the little reunification ====
In the Paris Agreements of 23 October 1954, France offered to establish an independent "Saarland", under the auspices of the Western European Union (WEU), but on 23 October 1955 in the Saar Statute referendum the Saar electorate rejected this plan by 67.7% to 32.3% (out of a 96.5% turnout: 423,434 against, 201,975 for) despite the public support of Federal German Chancellor Konrad Adenauer for the plan. The rejection of the plan by the Saarlanders was interpreted as support for the Saar to join the Federal Republic of Germany.

On 27 October 1956, the Saar Treaty established that Saarland should be allowed to join Germany, as provided by the German constitution. Saarland became part of Germany effective 1 January 1957. The Franco-Saarlander currency union ended on 6 July 1959, when the Deutsche Mark was introduced as legal tender in the Saarland.

==== Constitutional amendments ====
Paragraph 6 of Article 29 stated that, if a petition was successful, a referendum should be held within three years. Since the deadline passed on 5 May 1958 without anything happening, the Hesse state government filed a constitutional complaint with the Federal Constitutional Court in October 1958. The complaint was dismissed in July 1961 on the grounds that Article 29 had made the new delimitation of the federal territory an exclusively federal matter. At the same time, the Court reaffirmed the requirement for a territorial revision as a binding order to the relevant constitutional bodies.

The grand coalition decided to settle the 1956 petitions by setting binding deadlines for the required referendums. The referendums in Lower Saxony and Rhineland-Palatinate were to be held by 31 March 1975, and the referendum in Baden was to be held by 30 June 1970. The threshold for a successful vote was set at one-quarter of those entitled to vote in Bundestag elections. Paragraph 4 stated that the vote should be disregarded if it contradicted the objectives of paragraph 1.

In his investiture address, given on 28 October 1969 in Bonn, Chancellor Willy Brandt proposed that the government would consider Article 29 of the Basic Law as a binding order. An expert commission was established, named after its chairman, the former Secretary of State Professor Werner Ernst. After two years of work, the experts delivered their report in 1973. It provided an alternative proposal for the two regions: the north and center-southwest.

In the north, either a single new state consisting of Schleswig-Holstein, Hamburg, Bremen and Lower Saxony should be created (solution A) or two new states, one in the northeast consisting of Schleswig-Holstein, Hamburg and the northern part of Lower Saxony (from Cuxhaven to Lüchow-Dannenberg) and one in the northwest consisting of Bremen and the rest of Lower Saxony (solution B).

In the center and southwest, one alternative was that Rhineland-Palatinate (with the exception of the Germersheim district but including the Rhine-Neckar region) should be merged with Hesse and the Saarland (solution C), the district of Germersheim would then become part of Baden-Württemberg. The other alternative was that the Palatinate (including the region of Worms) could be merged with the Saarland and Baden-Württemberg, and the rest of Rhineland-Palatinate would then merge with Hesse (solution D).

Both alternatives could be combined (AC, BC, AD, BD).

At the same time, the commission developed criteria for classifying the terms of Article 29 Paragraph 1. The capacity to perform functions effectively was considered most important, whereas regional, historical, and cultural ties were considered as hardly verifiable. To fulfill administrative duties adequately, a population of at least five million per state was considered as necessary.

After a relatively brief discussion and mostly negative responses from the affected states, the proposals were shelved. Public interest was limited or nonexistent.

The referendum in Baden was held on 7 June 1970. 81.9% of voters decided for Baden to remain part of Baden-Württemberg, only 18.1% opted for the reconstitution of the old state of Baden.

The referendums in Lower Saxony and Rhineland-Palatinate were held on 19 January 1975 (the percentages given are the percentages of those eligible who voted in favour):

- reconstitution of the Free State of Oldenburg 31%
- reconstitution of the Free State of Schaumburg-Lippe 39.5%
- integration of Koblenz and Trier into North Rhine-Westphalia 13%
- reintegration of Rheinhessen into Hesse 7.1%
- reintegration of Montabaur region into Hesse 14.3%

The votes in Lower Saxony were successful as both proposals were supported by more than 25% of eligible voters. The Bundestag, however, decided that both Oldenburg and Schaumburg-Lippe should remain part of Lower Saxony. The justification was that a reconstitution of the two former states would contradict the objectives of paragraph 1 of article 29 of the constitution. An appeal against the decision was rejected as inadmissible by the Federal Constitutional Court.

On 24 August 1976, the binding provision for a new delimitation of the federal territory was altered into a mere discretionary one. Paragraph 1 of Article 29 was rephrased, with the provision that any state had to be "of a size and capacity to perform its functions effectively" put first. The option for a referendum in the Federal Republic as a whole (paragraph 4) was abolished, which meant territorial revision was no longer possible against the will of the population affected by it.

=== Reunited Germany, 1990–present ===
East Germany had originally consisted of five states (i.e., Brandenburg, Mecklenburg-Vorpommern, Saxony, Saxony-Anhalt, and Thuringia). In 1952, these states were abolished and the East was divided into 14 administrative districts called Bezirke. Soviet-controlled East Berlin – despite officially having the same status as West Berlin – was declared East Germany's capital and its 15th district.

The debate on territorial revision restarted shortly before German reunification. While academics (Rutz and others) and politicians (Gobrecht) suggested introducing only two, three, or four states in East Germany, legislation reconstituted the East German states in an arrangement similar to that which they had had before 1952, as the five "New States" on 3 October 1990. The former district of East Berlin joined West Berlin to form the new state of Berlin. Henceforth, the 10 "old states", plus 5 "new states", plus the new state of Berlin, add up to the current 16 states of Germany.

After reunification, the constitution was amended to state that the citizens of the 16 states had successfully achieved the unity of Germany in free self-determination and that the West German constitution thus applied to the entire German people. Article 23, which had allowed "any other parts of Germany" to join, was rephrased. It had been used in 1957 to reintegrate the Saar Protectorate as the Saarland into the Federal Republic, and this was used as a model for German reunification in 1990. The amended article now defines the participation of the Federal Council and the 16 German states in matters concerning the European Union. Article 29 was again modified and provided an option for the states to "revise the division of their existing territory or parts of their territory by agreement without regard to the provisions of paragraphs (2) through (7)". Article 118a was introduced into the Basic Law and provided the possibility for Berlin and Brandenburg to merge "without regard to the provisions of Article 29, by agreement between the two Länder with the participation of their inhabitants who are entitled to vote". A state treaty between Berlin and Brandenburg was approved in both parliaments with the necessary two-thirds majority, but in a popular referendum of 5 May 1996, about 63% voted against the merger.

The German states can conclude treaties with foreign countries in matters within their own sphere of competence and with the consent of the federal government (Article 32 of the Basic Law). Typical treaties relate to cultural relationships and economic affairs.

Some states call themselves a "free state" (Freistaat). It is merely a historic synonym for "republic" and was a description used by most German states after the abolition of monarchy after World War I. Today, Freistaat is associated emotionally with a more independent status, especially in Bavaria. However, it has no legal significance. All sixteen states are represented at the federal level in the Bundesrat (Federal Council), where their voting power depends on the size of their population.

== Politics ==
=== Relationship with the Federation ===
Federalism is one of the entrenched constitutional principles of Germany. Accordingly, the states form a considerable counterweight to the power of the federation. In principle, the power to enact laws lies with the states; the federation can only enact its own laws if the Basic Law explicitly assigns it legislative powers in the respective area. This can be done in two ways:

- The federation can be granted exclusive legislative authority. In this case, the federation alone is authorized to legislate in this area. This applies, for example, to foreign and defense policy.
- The federation can be granted the right to concurrent legislation. In this case, the federation and the states can both enact laws in the respective area; in case of doubt, however, a federal law takes precedence over a state law. This applies, for example, to tax law.

In other areas, only the states are authorized to legislate; this includes, among other things, police law and culture (which in Germany also encompasses the school, vocational training, and university systems).

Even in the areas that the Basic Law assigns to the federal government in whole or in part, the states retain influence on legislation, since the state governments are involved in legislation at the federal level through the Bundesrat. Above all, the federal government can only assume additional powers that have so far resided with the states if the constitution is amended, which requires, among other things, a two-thirds majority in the Bundesrat. The states cannot therefore be disempowered against their will.

=== Government ===
Composition of German states' governing coalitions

The federal constitution stipulates that the structure of each Federated State's government must "conform to the principles of republican, democratic, and social government, based on the rule of law" (Article 28). Most of the states are governed by a cabinet led by a Ministerpräsident (minister-president), together with a unicameral legislative body known as the Landtag (State Diet). The states are parliamentary republics and the relationship between their legislative and executive branches mirrors that of the federal system: the legislatures are popularly elected for four or five years (depending on the state), and the minister-president is then chosen by a majority vote among the Landtag's members. The minister-president is typically the head of the biggest party of a coalition. The minister-president appoints a cabinet to run the state's agencies and to carry out the executive duties of the state's government. Like in other parliamentary systems, the legislature can dismiss or replace the minister-president after a successful no-confidence vote.

The governments in Berlin, Bremen and Hamburg are referred to as "senates". In the free states of Bavaria and Saxony, the government is referred to as "state government" (Staatsregierung); and in the other states, the government is referred to as "Land government" (Landesregierung). Before 1 January 2000, Bavaria had a bicameral parliament, with a popularly elected Landtag, and a Senate made up of representatives of the state's major social and economic groups. The Senate was abolished following a referendum in 1998. The states of Berlin, Bremen, and Hamburg are governed slightly differently from the other states. In each of those cities, the executive branch consists of a Senate of approximately eight, selected by the state's parliament; the senators carry out duties equivalent to those of the ministers in the larger states. The equivalent of the minister-president is the Senatspräsident (president of the senate), also commonly referred to as Bürgermeister (Mayor) in Bremen, the Erster Bürgermeister (first mayor) in Hamburg, and the Regierender Bürgermeister (governing mayor) in Berlin. The parliament for Berlin is called the Abgeordnetenhaus (House of Representatives), while Bremen and Hamburg both have a Bürgerschaft. The parliaments in the remaining 13 states are referred to as Landtag (State Parliament).

== Subdivisions ==
Administrative divisions of Germany (clickable image)

The city-states of Berlin and Hamburg are subdivided into districts. The City of Bremen consists of two urban districts: Bremen and Bremerhaven, which are not contiguous. In the other states there are the subdivisions below.

=== Area associations (Landschaftsverbände) ===
The most populous state of North Rhine-Westphalia is uniquely divided into two area associations (Landschaftsverbände), one for the Rhineland, and one for Westphalia-Lippe. This arrangement was meant to ease the friction caused by uniting the two culturally different regions into a single state after World War II. The Landschaftsverbände now have very little power.

The constitution of Mecklenburg-Vorpommern at §75 states the right of Mecklenburg and Vorpommern to form Landschaftsverbände, although the old border between these two constituent parts of the state is not represented in the current administrative division.

=== Governmental districts (Regierungsbezirke) ===
The large states of Baden-Württemberg, Bavaria, Hesse, and North Rhine-Westphalia are divided into governmental districts, or Regierungsbezirke.

In Rhineland-Palatinate, these districts were abolished or re-organized on 1 January 2000, in Saxony-Anhalt on 1 January 2004, and in Lower Saxony on 1 January 2005. From 1990 until 2012, Saxony was divided into three districts (called Direktionsbezirke since 2008). In 2012, these districts' authorities were merged into one central authority, the Landesdirektion Sachsen.

=== Administrative districts (Kreise) ===
Map of German districts. Yellow districts are urban, while cream districts are suburban or rural.

The Districts of Germany (Kreise) are administrative districts, and every state except the city-states of Berlin and Hamburg and the state of Bremen consists of "rural districts" (Landkreise), District-free Towns/Cities (Kreisfreie Städte, in Baden-Württemberg also called "urban districts", or Stadtkreise), cities that are districts in their own right, or local associations of a special kind (Kommunalverbände besonderer Art), see below. The state Free Hanseatic City of Bremen consists of two urban districts, while Berlin and Hamburg are states and urban districts at the same time.

As of 2011, there are 295 Landkreise and 107 Kreisfreie Städte, making 402 districts altogether. Each consists of an elected council and an executive, which is chosen either by the council or by the people, depending on the state, the duties of which are comparable to those of a county executive in the United States, supervising local government administration. The Landkreise have primary administrative functions in specific areas, such as highways, hospitals, and public utilities.

Local associations of a special kind are an amalgamation of one or more Landkreise with one or more Kreisfreie Städte to form a replacement of the aforementioned administrative entities at the district level. They are intended to implement simplification of administration at that level. Typically, a district-free city or town and its urban hinterland are grouped into such an association, or Kommunalverband besonderer Art. Such an organization requires the issuing of special laws by the governing state, since they are not covered by the normal administrative structure of the respective states.

In 2010 only three Kommunalverbände besonderer Art exist.

- District of Hanover: formed in 2001 from the rural district of Hanover and the district-free city of Hanover.
- Regionalverband (district association) of Saarbrücken: formed in 2008 from the Stadtverband Saarbrücken (city association of Saarbrücken), which was formed in 1974.
- City region of Aachen: formed in 2009 from the rural district of Aachen and the district-free city of Aachen.

=== Offices (Ämter) ===
Ämter ("offices" or "bureaus"): in some states, there is an administrative unit between the districts and the municipalities, called Ämter (singular Amt), Amtsgemeinden, Gemeindeverwaltungsverbände, Landgemeinden, Verbandsgemeinden, Verwaltungsgemeinschaften, or Kirchspiellandgemeinden.

=== Municipalities (Gemeinden) ===
Municipalities (Gemeinden): every rural district and every Amt is subdivided into municipalities, while every urban district is a municipality in its own right. There are (as of 6 March 2009) 12,141 municipalities, which are the smallest administrative units in Germany. Cities and towns are municipalities as well, also having city rights or town rights (Stadtrechte). Nowadays, this is mostly just the right to be called a city or town. However, in former times there were many other privileges, including the right to impose local taxes or to allow industry only within city limits. Municipalities have the competence to define the amount of taxes to be paid, esp. facing Gewerbesteuer (company tax) and Grundsteuer (property tax). Municipalities have the competence to deliver local services of general interest (so called Kommunale Daseinsvorsorge).

The number of inhabitants of German municipalities differs greatly, the most populous municipality being Berlin with nearly 3.8 million inhabitants, while the least populous municipalities (for instance, Gröde in Nordfriesland) have less than 10 inhabitants.

The municipalities are ruled by elected councils and by an executive, the mayor, who is chosen either by the council or directly by the people, depending on the state. The "constitution" for the municipalities is created by the states and is uniform throughout a state (except for Bremen, which allows Bremerhaven to have its own constitution).

The municipalities have two major policy responsibilities. First, they administer programs authorized by the federal or state government. Such programs typically relate to youth, schools, public health, and social assistance. Second, Article 28(2) of the Basic Law guarantees the municipalities "the right to regulate on their own responsibility all the affairs of the local community within the limits set by law". Under this broad statement of competence, local governments can justify a wide range of activities. For instance, many municipalities develop and expand the economic infrastructure of their communities through the development of industrial trading estates.

Local authorities foster cultural activities by supporting local artists, building arts centres, and by holding fairs. Local government also provides public utilities, such as gas and electricity, as well as public transportation. The majority of the funding for municipalities is provided by higher levels of government rather than from taxes raised and collected directly by themselves.

In five of the German states, there are unincorporated areas, in many cases unpopulated forest and mountain areas, but also four Bavarian lakes that are not part of any municipality. As of 1 January 2005, there were 246 such areas, with a total area of 4167.66 km^{2} or 1.2% of the total area of Germany. Only four unincorporated areas are populated, with a total population of around 2,000. The table below provides an overview.

Unincorporated areas in German states
State	2022-01-01	2005-01-01		2000-01-01	
State	Number	Number	Area (km^{2})	Number	Area (km^{2})
Bavaria	173	216	2,725.06	262	2,992.78
Lower Saxony	25	23	949.16	25	1,394.10
Hesse	4	4	327.05	4	327.05
Schleswig-Holstein	2	2	99.41	2	99.41
Baden-Württemberg	2	1	66.98	2	76.99
Total	206	246	4,167.66	295	4,890.33

In 2000, the number of unincorporated areas was 295, with a total area of 4,890.33 square kilometres (1,888.17 sq mi). However, the unincorporated areas are continually being incorporated into neighboring municipalities, wholly or partially, most frequently in Bavaria.

== See also ==
- Cantons of Switzerland
- Composition of the German state parliaments
- Elections in Germany
- German Bundesländer €2 coins
- Landespolizei – German state police
- List of administrative divisions by country
- List of cities and towns in Germany
- List of German states by area
- List of German states by exports
- List of German states by fertility rate
- List of German states by GRP
- List of German states by household income
- List of German states by Human Development Index
- List of German states by life expectancy
- List of German states by population
- List of German states by population density
- List of German states by poverty rate
- List of German states by unemployment rate
- List of states in the Holy Roman Empire – the German states prior to 1815
- States of Austria
