= List of Brazilian states by infant mortality =

Brazilian map of infant mortality. 5,4-7,49 per 1000 7,5-9,49 per 1000 9,5-12,49 per 1000 12,5-21,0 per 1000

There are 26 States of Brazil, or Estados in Portuguese, which are the federal states of Brazil, plus the Federal District which holds the capital city, Brasília. This and the below figures are based on 2022 estimate data, the value for women are 10.02 per 1000 and for men are 11.68 per 1000 people, both combined are 10.85 for 1000.

Position	State	Infant deaths per 1,000 live births
1	Espírito Santo	5,40
2	Paraná	5,70
3	Santa Catarina	5,99
4	Rio Grande do Sul	6,52
5	São Paulo	6,65
6	Minas Gerais	6,86
7	Distrito Federal	7,68
8	Rio de Janeiro	7,83
9	Pernambuco	8,96
10	Rio Grande do Norte	9,86
11	Ceará	9,91
12	Mato Grosso do Sul	10,19
13	Paraíba	10,87
14	Sergipe	10,97
15	Goiás	11,08
16	Tocantins	11,77
17	Bahia	12,33
18	Pará	12,35
19	Acre	12,36
20	Alagoas	12,57
21	Mato Grosso	13,06
22	Amazonas	13,78
23	Piauí	14,43
24	Roraima	14,52
25	Maranhão	14,78
26	Rondônia	16,08
27	Amapá	20,37

== See also ==
- Brazil
- List of Brazilian states by murder rate
- List of subnational entities
- States of Brazil
