= List of Canadian provinces and territories by historical population =

This is a list of Canadian historical population by province and territory, drawn from the Canadian census of population data and pre-Confederation censuses of Newfoundland and Labrador. Since 1871, Canada has conducted regular national census counts. The data for 1851 to 1976 is drawn primarily from Historical Statistics of Canada, 2nd edition. Data for 1981 through 2021 are from the respective year's respective census. Newfoundland and Labrador pre-Confederation data is from the 1945 Census of Newfoundland and Labrador, volume 1. Data for 1841 and some 1851 data drawn from the 1931 Canadian census. With the exception of Nunavut prior to 1996, the population figures largely reflect modern provincial boundaries; prior to 1996, the population of modern Nunavut is reported with Northwest Territories. Although the census has worked to count First Nations populations since 1871, the it is likely Indigenous Canadians are undercounted by the census. Shaded blocks indicate periods before the province or territory joined the Canadian Confederation. Instances where the reported figure came from a different year's population count (primarily pre-1861 and for Newfoundland) are noted. Total Canadian population row includes the population of Newfoundland and Labrador.

== 1700 to 1825 ==
Estimates from The Canada Year Book (1867) based on various provincial census records.

Name	1700	1725	1750	1775	1800	1825
Lower Canada	14,000	29,000	54,500	96,000	225,000	450,000
(Nova Scotia) New Brunswick (Note: Split from Nova Scotia in 1784.)					10,000	75,000
Newfoundland	500	5,000	10,000	16,000	10,000	45,759
Nova Scotia (Note: Includes population of the Colony of Cape Breton (1784–1820))	1,300	5,000	14,000	20,000	57,000	150,000
(Nova Scotia) Prince Edward Island (Note: Split from Nova Scotia in 1769.)		300	2,500	10,000	20,000	28,600
Upper Canada				8,000	50,000	158,027
Total	15,800	39,300	81,000	150,000	382,000	907,386

== 1841 to 1931 ==
Name	Confederated (Note: Dates for when the province or territory entered the Canadian Confederation.)	1841	1851	1861	1871 (Note: First national census, as required in the British North America Act 1867.)	1881	1891	1901	1911	1921	1931
Alberta	1905				6,272	14,720	25,277 (Note: Extracted from Northwest Territories enumeration.)	73,022	374,295	588,454	731,605
British Columbia	1871	62,100	55,000	51,524	36,247	49,459	98,173	178,657	392,480	524,582	694,263
Manitoba	1870	4,704 (Note: Assiniboine and Red River, 1840)	5,391 (Note: Assiniboine and Red River, 1849)	6,766	25,228	62,260	152,506	255,211	461,394	610,118	700,139
New Brunswick	1867	156,162 (Note: 1840)	193,800	252,047	285,594	321,233	321,263	331,120	351,889	387,876	408,219
Newfoundland and Labrador (Note: Originally Newfoundland Colony and from 1907–1949 Dominion of Newfoundland)	1949	96,296 (Note: 1845)	101,600	124,288 (Note: 1857: 122,638 in Newfoundland; 1,650 in Labrador)	146,436 (Note: 1869: 144,286 in Newfoundland; 2,150 in Labrador)	197,335 (Note: 1884: 193,124 in Newfoundland; 4,211 in Labrador)	202,040 (Note: 197,934 in Newfoundland; 4,106 in Labrador)	220,984 (Note: 217,037 in Newfoundland; 3,947 in Labrador)	242,619 (Note: 238,670 in Newfoundland; 2,949 in Labrador)	263,033 (Note: 259,259 in Newfoundland; 3,774 in Labrador)	289,588 (Note: 1935: 284,872 in Newfoundland; 4,716 in Labrador)
Northwest Territories	1870		5,700	6,691	48,000	56,446	62,540	20,129	6,507	8,143	9,316
Nova Scotia	1867	202,575 (Note: 1838)	276,854	330,857	387,800	440,572	450,396	459,574	492,338	523,837	512,846
Nunavut (Note: Included in count for Northwest Territories)	1999										
Ontario	1867	466,831 (Note: Upper Canada)	952,004 (Note: Canada West)	1,396,091	1,620,851	1,926,922	2,114,321	2,182,947	2,527,292	2,933,662	3,431,683
Prince Edward Island	1873	47,042	62,678 (Note: 1849)	80,857	94,021	108,891	109,078	103,259	93,728	88,615	88,038
Quebec	1867	716,670 (Note: Lower Canada)	890,261 (Note: Canada East)	1,111,566	1,191,516	1,359,027	1,488,535	1,648,898	2,005,776	2,360,510	2,874,662
Saskatchewan	1905				6,924	8,804	11,150	91,279	492,432	757,510	921,785
Yukon	1898							27,219	8,512	4,157	4,230
Canada (Note: Includes population of Newfoundland and Labrador prior to confederation)		1,752,380	2,543,288	3,353,921	3,835,793	4,522,145	5,035,279	5,592,299	7,449,262	8,787,949	10,666,374

== 1941 to 1991 ==
Name	1941	1951	1956	1961	1966	1971	1976	1981	1986	1991
Alberta	796,169	939,501	1,123,116	1,331,944	1,463,203	1,627,874	1,838,037	2,213,650	2,365,825	2,545,553
British Columbia	817,861	1,165,210	1,398,464	1,629,082	1,873,674	2,184,621	2,466,608	2,713,615	2,883,367	3,282,061
Manitoba	729,744	776,541	850,040	921,686	963,066	988,247	1,021,506	1,013,705	1,063,016	1,091,942
New Brunswick	457,401	515,697	554,616	597,936	616,788	634,557	677,250	689,375	709,442	723,900
Newfoundland and Labrador	316,294 (Note: 1945: 316,294 in Newfoundland; 5,525 in Labrador)	361,416	415,074	457,853	493,396	522,104	557,725	563,750	568,349	568,474
Northwest Territories	12,028	16,004	19,313	22,998	28,738	34,807	42,609	45,540	52,238	57,649
Nova Scotia	577,962	642,584	694,717	737,007	756,039	788,960	828,571	839,805	873,176	899,942
Nunavut										
Ontario	3,787,655	4,597,542	5,404,933	6,236,092	6,960,870	7,703,106	8,264,465	8,534,265	9,101,694	10,084,885
Prince Edward Island	95,047	98,429	99,285	104,629	108,535	111,641	118,229	121,225	126,646	129,765
Quebec	3,331,882	4,055,681	4,628,378	5,259,211	5,780,845	6,027,764	6,234,445	6,369,065	6,532,461	6,895,963
Saskatchewan	895,992	831,728	880,665	925,181	955,344	926,242	921,323	956,440	1,009,613	988,928
Yukon	4,914	9,096	12,190	14,628	14,382	18,388	21,836	23,075	23,504	27,797
Canada	11,828,474	14,009,429	16,080,791	18,238,247	20,014,880	21,568,311	22,992,604	24,083,510	25,309,331	27,296,859

== 1996 to 2021 ==
Name	1996	2001	2006	2011	2016	2021
Alberta	2,696,826	2,974,807	3,290,350	3,645,257	4,067,175	4,262,635
British Columbia	3,724,500	3,907,738	4,113,487	4,400,057	4,648,055	5,000,879
Manitoba	1,113,898	1,119,583	1,148,401	1,208,268	1,278,365	1,342,153
New Brunswick	738,133	729,498	729,997	751,171	747,101	775,610
Newfoundland and Labrador	551,792	512,930	505,469	514,536	519,716	510,550
Northwest Territories	39,672	37,360	41,464	41,462	41,786	41,070
Nova Scotia	909,282	908,007	913,462	921,727	923,598	969,383
Nunavut	24,730	26,745	29,474	31,906	35,944	36,858
Ontario	10,753,573	11,410,046	12,160,282	12,851,821	13,448,494	14,223,942
Prince Edward Island	134,557	135,294	135,851	140,204	142,907	154,331
Quebec	7,138,795	7,237,479	7,546,131	7,903,001	8,164,361	8,501,833
Saskatchewan	990,237	978,933	968,157	1,033,381	1,098,352	1,132,505
Yukon	30,766	28,674	30,372	33,897	35,874	40,232
Canada	28,846,761	30,007,094	31,612,897	33,476,688	35,151,728	36,991,981
