= List of South African provinces by GDP =

This article lists the provinces of South Africa by their gross regional domestic product (GDP).

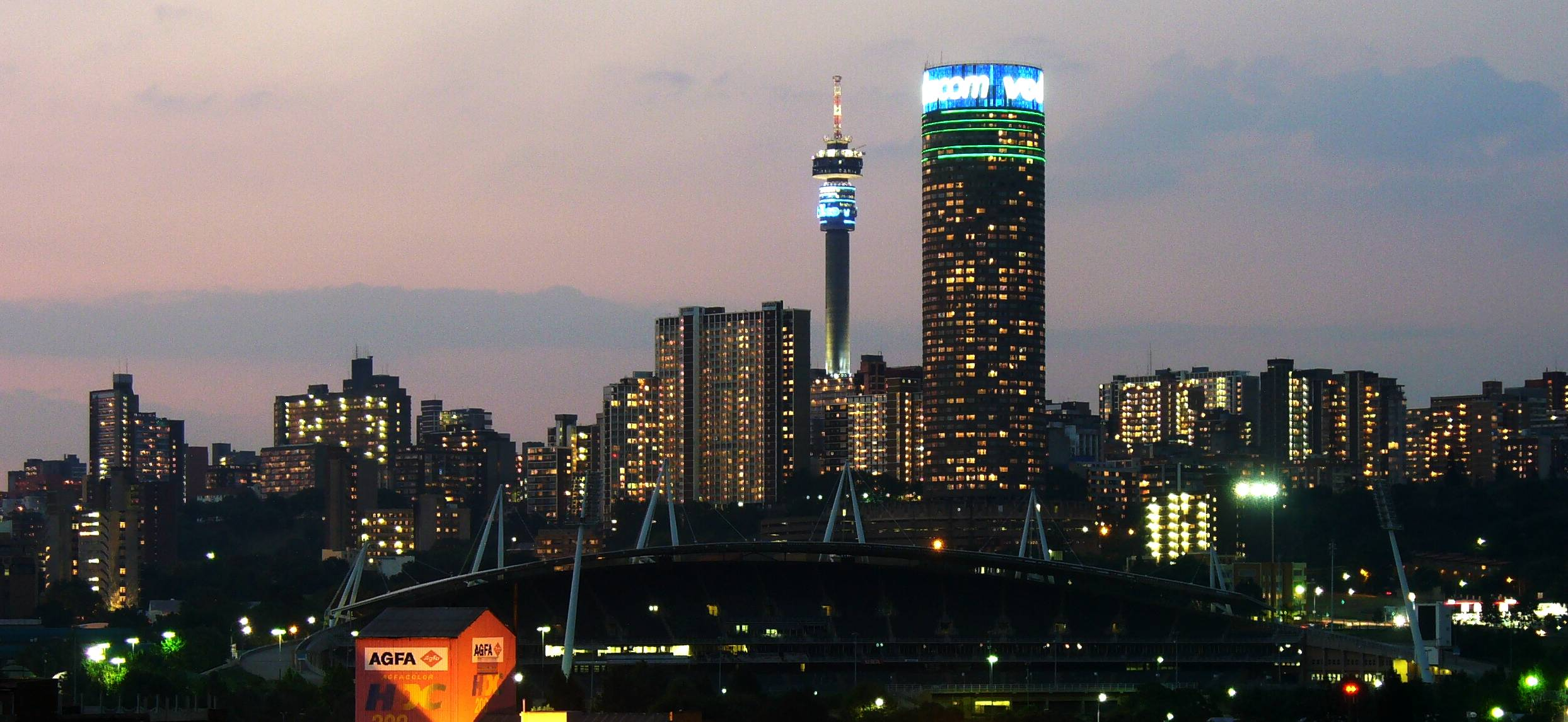
Gauteng province has the largest GDP in South Africa (US$158 billion)

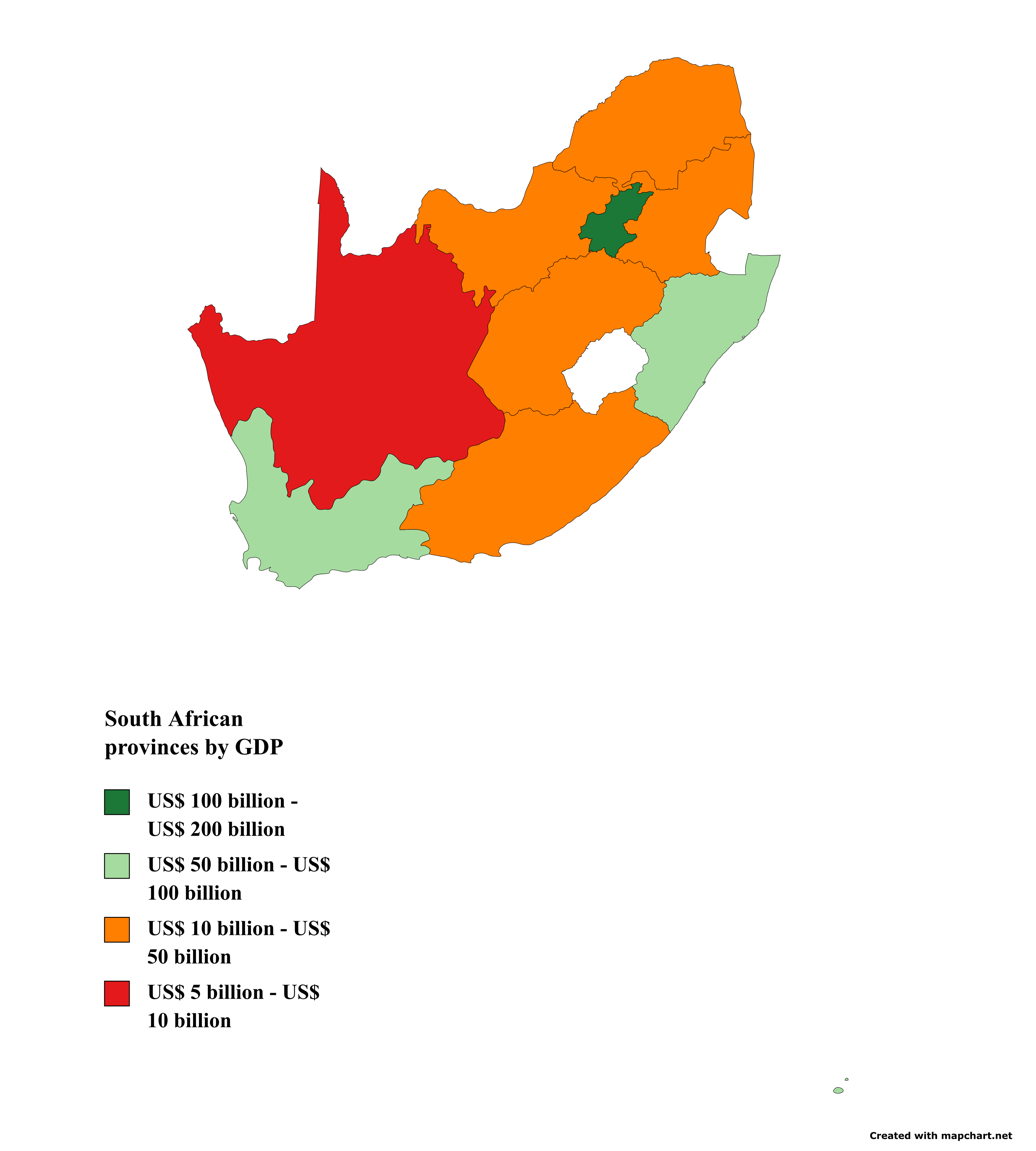
South African provinces by GDP

== Total ==
Rank	Province	GDP (nominal, 2025)	GDP per capita (nominal, 2023)
1	Gauteng	ZAR 2.62 trillion (US$176.93 billion)	ZAR 154,299 (US$10,439.72)
2	KwaZulu-Natal	ZAR 1.25 trillion (US$84.32 billion)	ZAR 110,811 (US$7,497.36)
3	Western Cape	ZAR 1.15 trillion (US$77.49 billion)	ZAR 132,470 (US$8,962.79)
4	Limpopo	ZAR 664.63 billion (US$44.97 billion)	ZAR 81,486 (US$5,513.26)
5	Eastern Cape	ZAR 625.98 billion (US$42.35 billion)	ZAR 74,320 (US$5,028.42)
6	Mpumalanga	ZAR 614.77 billion (US$41.59 billion)	ZAR 106,831 (US$7,228.08)
7	North West	ZAR 522.91 billion (US$35.38 billion)	ZAR 118,056 (US$7,987.55)
8	Free State	ZAR 388.38 billion (US$26.28 billion)	ZAR 115,390 (US$7,807.17)
9	Northern Cape	ZAR 219.95 billion (US$14.88 billion)	ZAR 116,698 (US$7,895.67)
South Africa		ZAR 8.04 trillion (US$544.24 billion)	ZAR 113,240 (US$7,661.71)

== See also ==
- List of South African provinces by population
- Economy of South Africa
