= List of Mexican states by infant mortality =

The following is the list of infant mortality by states of Mexico, it included all infants under the age of four.

Mexican States by Infant Mortality (2006, Total)
Number	State	Infant mortality (Total)
1	Aguascalientes	52
2	Baja California	145
3	Baja California Sur	26
4	Campeche	21
5	Coahuila	95
6	Colima	29
7	Chiapas	494
8	Chihuahua	231
9	Federal District	312
10	Durango	89
11	Guanajuato	274
12	Guerrero	184
13	Hidalgo	143
14	Jalisco	350
15	Mexico State	766
16	Michoacán	270
17	Morelos	91
18	Nayarit	50
19	Nuevo León	128
20	Oaxaca	320
21	Puebla	468
22	Querétaro	101
23	Quintana Roo	67
24	San Luis Potosí	149
25	Sinaloa	114
26	Sonora	141
27	Tabasco	137
28	Tamaulipas	137
29	Tlaxcala	70
30	Veracruz	444
31	Yucatán	99
32	Zacatecas	78
