= List of federal subjects of Russia by poverty rate =

This is a list of federal subjects of Russia by poverty rate as of 2020. The international poverty rate used by the World Bank is used in the following list. The estimates can therefore differ from other estimates, like the national poverty rate.

== List ==
Percent of population living on less than $2.15, $3.65 and $6.85 a day, international dollars (2017 PPP) as per the World Bank.

Percent of population living on less than poverty thresholds
Federal subject	$2.15	$3.65	$6.85	Year of estimate
Tuva	0.00%	1.17%	15.67%	2020
Altai Krai	0.09%	1.38%	15.15%	2020
Mari El	0.00%	0.55%	15.09%	2020
Chechnya	0.06%	0.43%	14.63%	2020
Novosibirsk Oblast	0.00%	2.04%	11.89%	2020
Kabardino-Balkaria	0.00%	0.28%	10.64%	2020
Novgorod Oblast	0.40%	2.16%	10.04%	2020
Buryatia	0.10%	0.65%	9.35%	2020
Kemerovo Oblast	0.00%	0.47%	8.67%	2020
Ulyanovsk Oblast	0.00%	0.91%	8.96%	2020
Chuvashia	0.00%	0.14%	8.80%	2020
Stavropol Krai	0.00%	0.67%	8.63%	2020
Altai Republic	0.00%	0.29%	8.50%	2020
Kalmykia	0.00%	1.31%	8.29%	2020
Penza Oblast	0.00%	0.71%	7.90%	2020
Irkutsk Oblast	0.17%	0.58%	7.50%	2020
Pskov Oblast	0.00%	0.10%	7.78%	2020
Omsk Oblast	0.00%	0.05%	7.36%	2020
Smolensk Oblast	0.00%	0.08%	6.92%	2020
Tomsk Oblast	0.00%	1.00%	6.78%	2020
Orenburg Oblast	0.00%	0.35%	6.70%	2020
Saratov Oblast	0.00%	0.05%	6.30%	2020
North Ossetia–Alania	0.00%	0.00%	6.19%	2020
Perm Krai	0.03%	0.68%	6.15%	2020
Krasnodar Krai	0.00%	0.72%	5.98%	2020
Karachay-Cherkessia	0.00%	0.51%	5.78%	2020
Tambov Oblast	0.00%	0.25%	5.67%	2020
Mordovia	0.00%	0.00%	5.48%	2020
Zabaykalsky Krai	0.00%	0.05%	5.42%	2020
Yaroslavl Oblast	0.00%	0.30%	5.39%	2020
Kirov Oblast	0.00%	0.08%	5.06%	2020
Komi Republic	0.00%	0.15%	4.82%	2020
Kaliningrad Oblast	0.00%	0.04%	4.66%	2020
Voronezh Oblast	0.00%	0.30%	4.62%	2020
Dagestan	0.00%	0.00%	4.56%	2020
Sevastopol	0.00%	0.00%	4.01%	2020
Ryazan Oblast	0.00%	0.00%	3.86%	2020
Khabarovsk Krai	0.00%	1.92%	3.85%	2020
Krasnoyarsk Krai	0.00%	0.39%	3.75%	2020
Rostov Oblast	0.00%	0.18%	3.65%	2020
Kurgan Oblast	0.00%	0.20%	3.59%	2020
Sverdlovsk Oblast	0.00%	0.05%	3.58%	2020
Samara Oblast	0.00%	0.16%	3.50%	2020
Jewish Autonomous Oblast	0.00%	0.18%	3.42%	2020
Bashkortostan	0.00%	0.07%	3.29%	2020
Khakassia	0.00%	0.00%	3.19%	2020
Nizhny Novgorod Oblast	0.00%	0.00%	3.10%	2020
Adygea	0.00%	0.00%	2.76%	2020
Chelyabinsk Oblast	0.00%	0.65%	2.69%	2020
Tver Oblast	0.30%	0.33%	2.57%	2020
Vologda Oblast	0.00%	0.12%	2.45%	2020
Astrakhan Oblast	0.00%	0.00%	2.45%	2020
Tatarstan	0.00%	0.00%	2.32%	2020
Vladimir Oblast	0.00%	0.39%	2.28%	2020
Amur Oblast	0.00%	0.00%	2.04%	2020
Oryol Oblast	0.00%	0.00%	1.93%	2020
Karelia	0.00%	0.00%	1.85%	2020
Moscow Oblast	0.00%	0.09%	1.81%	2020
Tyumen Oblast	0.00%	0.04%	1.81%	2020
Tula Oblast	0.00%	0.07%	1.67%	2020
Udmurtia	0.00%	0.00%	1.66%	2020
Bryansk Oblast	0.00%	0.00%	1.61%	2020
Kostroma Oblast	0.00%	0.00%	1.58%	2020
Kaluga Oblast	0.00%	0.00%	1.45%	2020
Kursk Oblast	0.00%	0.00%	1.38%	2020
Primorsky Krai	0.00%	0.00%	1.34%	2020
Arkhangelsk Oblast	0.00%	0.00%	1.29%	2020
Sakha (Yakutia)	0.00%	0.00%	1.27%	2020
Ivanovo Oblast	0.00%	0.00%	1.18%	2020
Leningrad Oblast	0.00%	0.00%	1.08%	2020
Volgograd Oblast	0.00%	0.00%	1.03%	2020
Ingushetia	0.00%	0.00%	0.38%	2020
Magadan Oblast	0.00%	0.00%	0.39%	2020
Lipetsk Oblast	0.00%	0.00%	0.36%	2020
Sakhalin Oblast	0.00%	0.00%	0.24%	2020
Chukotka	0.00%	0.00%	0.22%	2020
Saint Petersburg	0.00%	0.00%	0.20%	2020
Belgorod Oblast	0.00%	0.00%	0.14%	2020
Kamchatka Krai	0.00%	0.00%	0.00%	2020
Murmansk Oblast	0.00%	0.00%	0.00%	2020
Moscow	0.00%	0.00%	0.00%	2020
Republic of Crimea	...	...	...	...
Russia	0.01%	0.29%	4.01%	2020
