= List of U.S. states and territories by infant mortality rates =

Infant mortality per 1,000 live births, per state <4.0 4.0-5.0 5.0-6.0 6.0-7.0 7.0-8.0 8.0-9.0 >9.0

This is a list of U.S. states, the District of Columbia and territories by infant mortality rates in 2021. The infant mortality rate is the number of deaths of infants under one year old per 1,000 live births. This rate is often used as an indicator of the level of health in a country. The child mortality rate is the number of deaths of infants and children under five years old per 100,000 live births.

== List by infant mortality rate ==
US States by infant mortality in 2021 according to the Centers for Disease Control and Prevention.

Rank	State, federal district, or territory	Infant mortality per 1,000 live births	Infant deaths
1	North Dakota	2.77	28
2	Massachusetts	3.23	223
3	New Jersey	3.57	362
4	Oregon	3.79	155
5	New Hampshire	3.96	50
6	Iowa	3.99	147
7	California	4.07	1,713
8	New York	4.16	876
9	Rhode Island	4.3	45
10	Washington	4.36	366
11	Utah	4.58	214
12	Connecticut	4.65	166
13	Hawaii	4.67	73
14	New Mexico	4.77	102
14	Delaware	4.77	50
16	Minnesota	4.83	311
17	Montana	4.9	55
18	Colorado	4.99	314
19	Maine	5	60
20	Idaho	5.13	115
21	Texas	5.29	1,977
22	Kansas	5.3	184
23	Wisconsin	5.36	331
24	Pennsylvania	5.37	712
−	United States	5.44	19,886
25	Wyoming	5.45	34
26	Arizona	5.47	426
27	Nebraska	5.49	135
28	Illinois	5.62	743
29	Nevada	5.76	194
30	Missouri	5.85	406
31	Florida	5.9	1,275
31	Puerto Rico	5.9	...
33	Virginia	5.96	571
34	Maryland	5.99	409
35	South Dakota	6.07	69
36	Kentucky	6.15	321
37	Tennessee	6.18	505
38	Michigan	6.22	653
39	Georgia	6.25	776
40	Vermont (2018)	6.44	35
41	North Carolina	6.72	809
42	Indiana	6.75	540
43	West Virginia	6.8	117
44	District of Columbia	6.81	...
45	Ohio	7.06	916
46	Oklahoma	7.13	345
47	Louisiana	7.24	416
48	South Carolina	7.26	415
49	Alaska	7.37	69
50	U.S. Virgin Islands	7.5	...
51	Alabama	7.56	439
52	Arkansas	8.59	309
53	Mississippi	9.39	330
54	American Samoa	9.9	...
55	Guam	11.2	...
56	Northern Mariana Islands	12.2	...
