= List of governorates of Egypt by GDP =

This is a list of governorates of Egypt by GDP and GDP per capita. The Egyptian pound (EGP) has been converted to the international dollar using the IMF's Purchasing Power Parity conversion rate (one International dollar per 4.538 EGP in 2021).

== Governorates by GDP ==
The following table is the list of the governorates of Egypt by GDP in 2021 according to data by the Ministry of Planning and Development.

Rank	Governorate	GDP in millions of EGP (Nominal)	GDP in millions of Int$ (PPP)
1	Cairo	1,876,650	413,541
2	Giza	770,071	169,694
3	Alexandria	565,875	124,697
4	Qalyubia	339,316	74,772
5	Sharqia	302,065	66,563
6	Dakahlia	294,016	64,790
7	Beheira	288,857	63,653
8	Port Said	190,154	41,903
9	Gharbia	173,762	38,290
10	Monufia	157,267	34,656
11	Kafr El Sheikh	151,053	33,286
12	Faiyum	133,504	29,419
13	Minya	130,976	28,862
14	Asyut	126,143	27,797
15	Suez	119,129	26,251
16	Matrouh	115,552	25,463
17	Damietta	110,340	24,314
18	Sohag	107,756	23,745
19	Ismailia	91,127	20,910
20	Beni Suef	87,194	19,214
21	Qena	80,395	17,716
22	Aswan	76,265	16,806
23	Red Sea	75,872	16,719
24	South Sinai	58,386	12,866
25	North Sinai	48,932	10,783
26	Luxor	46,634	10,276
27	New Valley	16,963	3,738
	Egypt	6,627,028	1,460,341

== Governorates by GDP per capita ==
The following table is the list of the governorates of Egypt by GDP per capita in 2021 according to data by the Ministry of Planning and Development.

Rank	Governorate	GDP in millions of EGP (Nominal)	Population (2021)	GDP per capita in EGP (Nominal)	GDP per capita in USD (PPP)
1	South Sinai	58,386	112,672	518,194	114,190
2	Port Said	190,154	780,515	243,626	53,686
3	Matrouh	115,552	511,545	225,888	49,777
4	Red Sea	75,872	390,070	194,509	42,862
5	Cairo	1,876,650	10,044,894	186,826	41,169
6	Suez	119,129	773,840	153,945	33,923
7	Alexandria	565,875	5,441,866	103,985	22,914
8	North Sinai	48,932	492,555	99,343	21,891
9	Giza	770,071	9,250,791	83,244	18,347
10	Damietta	110,340	1,585,253	69,604	15,338
11	New Valley	16,963	259,174	65,450	14,423
12	Ismailia	91,127	1,408,847	64,682	14,253
13	Qalyubia	339,316	5,982,567	56,717	12,498
14	Aswan	76,265	1,600,210	47,659	10,502
15	Beheira	288,857	6,676,858	43,262	9,533
16	Dakahlia	294,016	6,889,962	42,673	9,403
17	Kafr El Sheikh	151,053	3,620,887	41,717	9,193
18	Sharqia	302,065	7,682,770	39,317	8,663
19	Luxor	46,634	1,352,818	34,472	7,596
20	Monufia	157,267	4,604,599	34,154	7,526
21	Faiyum	133,504	3,928,020	33,988	7,490
22	Gharbia	173,762	5,309,440	32,727	7,212
23	Asyut	126,143	4,847,735	26,021	5,734
24	Beni Suef	87,194	3,455,733	25,232	5,560
25	Qena	80,395	3,492,867	23,017	5,072
26	Minya	130,976	6,077,791	21,550	4,749
27	Sohag	107,756	5,486,409	19,641	4,328
	Egypt	6,627,028	102,060,688	64,932	14,308
