= List of Chinese provincial-level divisions by tax revenues =

This is a list of the first-level administrative divisions of mainland China (including all provinces, autonomous regions, and municipalities) in order of tax revenues collected in 2007. The figures are given in millions of Renminbi in 2007.

Color	Regions of China
	North China
	East China
	Southwestern China
	Northwestern China
	South Central China
	Northeast China

Rank	Administrative Division	Region	Tax Revenues
—	China		2,357,262
1	Guangdong	South Central China	278,580
2	Jiangsu	East China	223,773
3	Shanghai	East China	207,448
4	Shandong	East China	167,540
5	Zhejiang	East China	164,950
6	Beijing	North China	149,264
7	Liaoning	Northeast China	108,269
8	Henan	South Central China	86,208
9	Sichuan	Southwestern China	85,086
10	Hebei	North China	78,912
11	Fujian	East China	69,946
12	Hunan	South Central China	60,655
13	Shanxi	North China	59,789^{2}
14	Hubei	South Central China	59,036
15	Anhui	East China	54,370
16	Tianjin	North China	54,044
17	Inner Mongolia	North China	49,236^{1}
18	Yunnan	Southwestern China	48,671
19	Shaanxi	Northwestern China	47,524
20	Chongqing	Southwestern China	44,270
21	Heilongjiang	Northeast China	44,047
22	Guangxi	South Central China	41,883
23	Jiangxi	East China	38,985
24	Jilin	Northeast China	32,069
25	Xinjiang	Northwestern China	28,586^{3}
26	Guizhou	Southwestern China	28,514
27	Gansu	Northwestern China	19,091
28	Hainan	South Central China	10,829
29	Ningxia	Northwestern China	8,003
30	Qinghai	Northwestern China	5,671
31	Tibet Autonomous Region	Southwestern China	2,014

== Notes ==
- ^1 Nei Mongol is the only province in China to levy a tax on banquets.
- ^2 Shanxi province collects about 60 per cent of the slaughter tax in China.
- ^3 Xinjiang is the only province in China to levy a tax on animal husbandry.
