= List of German states by fertility rate =

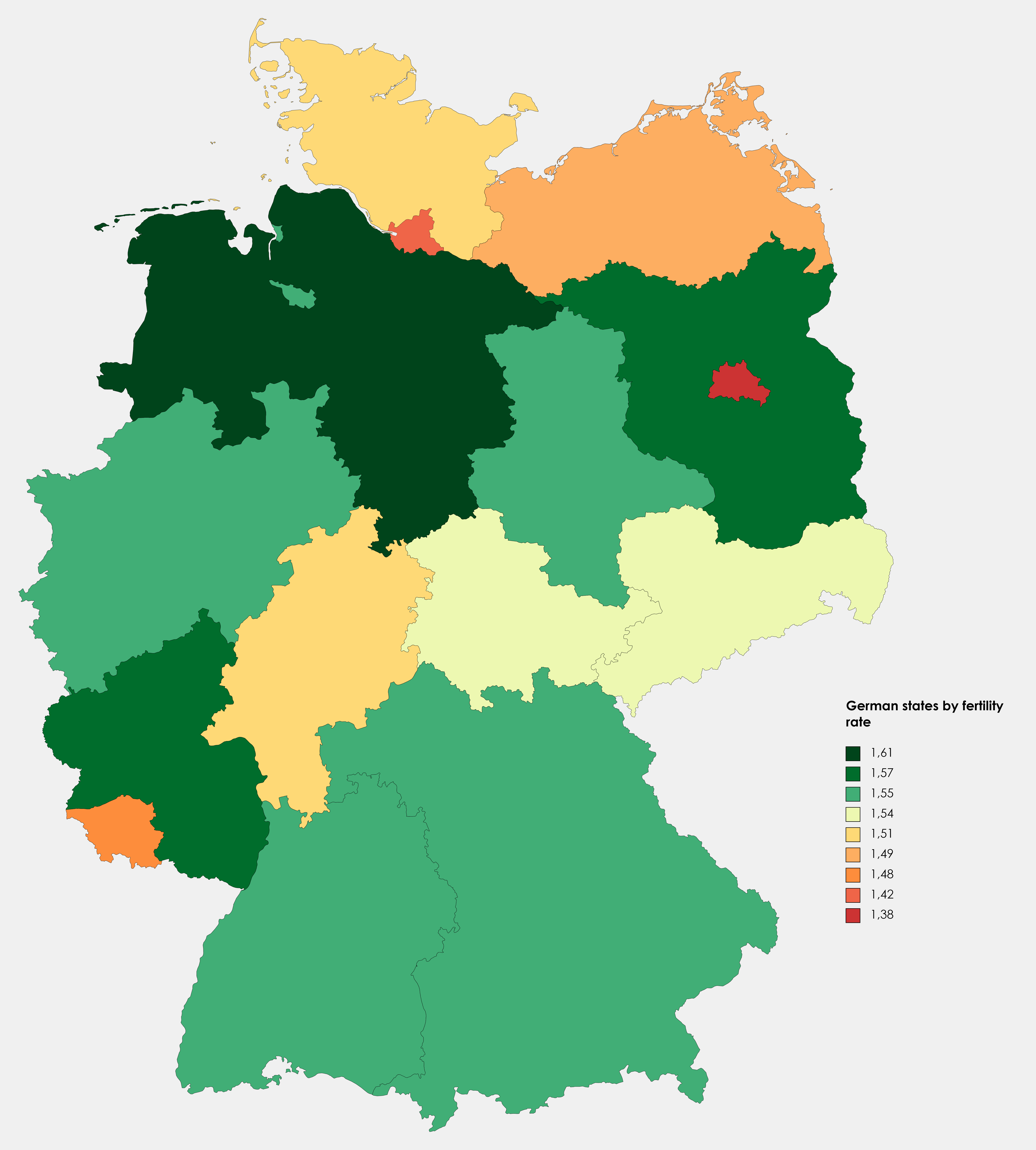
German States by fertility rate as of 2020

This is a list of German states by fertility rate as of 2022 according to the Federal Statistical Office of Germany.

| States | Fertility rate per woman | Number of births |
|---|---|---|
| Lower Saxony | 1.52 | 71,289 |
| Rhineland-Palatinate | 1.52 | 36,731 |
| Bremen | 1.51 | 6,720 |
| North Rhine-Westphalia | 1.49 | 164,496 |
| Bavaria | 1.49 | 124,897 |
| Baden-Württemberg | 1.49 | 104,549 |
| Brandenburg | 1.47 | 17,439 |
| Hesse | 1.46 | 57,360 |
| Schleswig-Holstein | 1.45 | 23,953 |
| Saxony-Anhalt | 1.45 | 14,506 |
| Thuringia | 1.43 | 14,131 |
| Saarland | 1.41 | 7,814 |
| Saxony | 1.4 | 29,331 |
| Mecklenburg-Vorpommern | 1.39 | 10,820 |
| Hamburg | 1.32 | 19,054 |
| Berlin | 1.25 | 35,729 |
| Germany | 1.46 | 738,819 |
