= List of German states by household income =

This is a list of German states by household income per capita in 2019 according to the Federal Statistical Office of Germany.

Rank	State	Household income per capita (in EUR€)
1	Bavaria	25,309
2	Hamburg	25,029
3	Baden-Württemberg	24,892
4	Hesse	23,943
5	Rhineland-Palatinate	23,197
6	Schleswig-Holstein	22,833
7	North Rhine-Westphalia	22,294
8	Lower Saxony	21,988
9	Bremen	21,481
10	Berlin	20,972
11	Brandenburg	20,475
12	Saxony	20,335
13	Saarland	20,277
14	Thuringia	19,793
15	Saxony-Anhalt	19,528
16	Mecklenburg-Vorpommern	19,470
	Germany	22,899
