= Old states of Germany =

Ten states of Germany, previously states in former West Germany

Map of West Germany 1957-1990

The old states of Germany (German: die alten Länder / die alten Bundesländer) is a jargon referring to the (since 1957) ten of the (since October 1990) sixteen states of the Federal Republic of Germany (FRG), commonly referred to as Germany. From 1949 to September 1990 the 10-state FRG was called West Germany, while the Soviet-occupied German Democratic Republic (GDR) was called East Germany, and divided into many districts.

In 1990 the citizens of the GDR voted to accede to the FRG, a process called German reunification. They formed five new states of Germany which acceded on 3 October 1990, dissolving the GDR.

Usage of this 10+5 terminology usually excludes the 16th state, Berlin, which had been divided into West Berlin and East Berlin, each having special status under the Four Power Agreement on Berlin. West Berlin was associated with the institutions of the Federal Republic of Germany on a limited basis, thus neither new nor old.

The 10 old states, mostly established before the FRG was formed in 1949, are Baden-Württemberg (merged in 1952 from 3 states), Bavaria, Bremen, Hamburg, Hessen, Lower Saxony, North Rhine-Westphalia, Rhineland-Palatinate, Saarland (acceded in 1957), and Schleswig-Holstein.

Decades after reunification, the former division is still noticeable in many aspects.

== Demographics ==
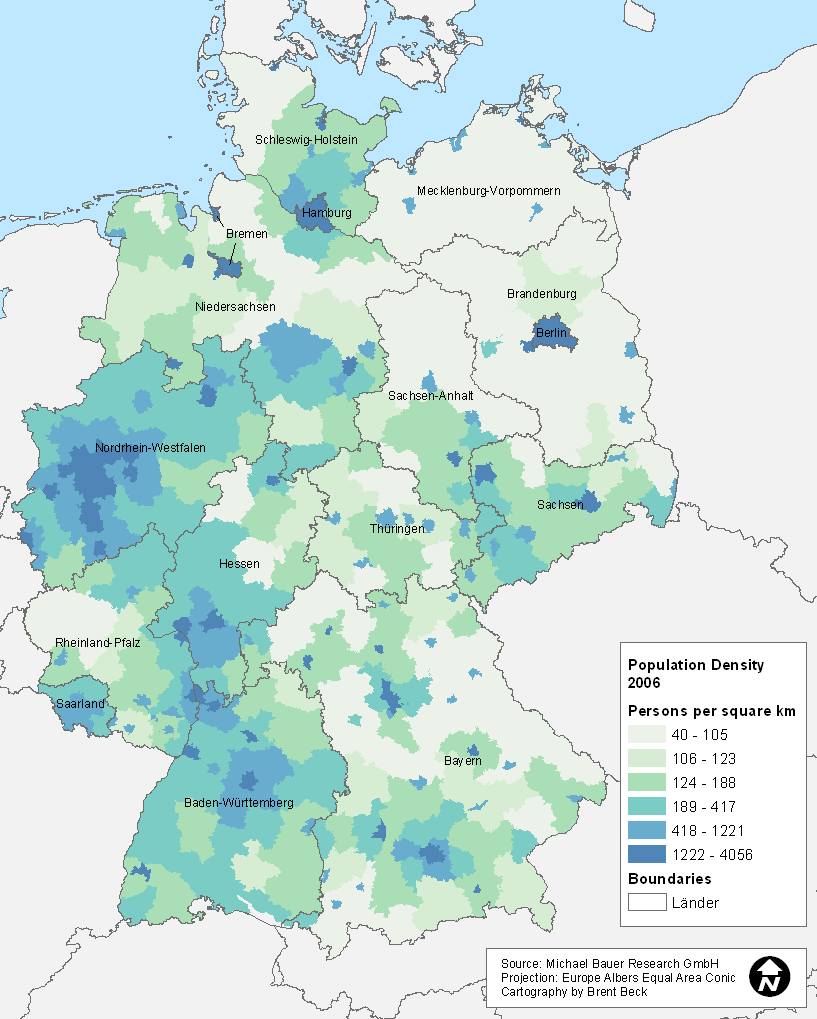
The population density of the new German states is lower than that of the old states.

In the old states, the populations also developed differently. In Baden-Württemberg, Bavaria, Hamburg, Hessen and Schleswig-Holstein, the population increased steadily. In Saarland, on the other hand, the population dropped steadily. The population of North Rhine-Westphalia (until 2004), Lower Saxony and Rhineland-Palatinate (both until 2003) initially increased and then fell off again. The population of Bremen dropped until the year 2001, then rose to the year 2007 and began to fall again in 2008.

Since 1980, birth rates have been relatively constant.

=== Migration ===
Proportion of Germans without a migrant background (2016)

There are more migrants in former West Germany than in former East Germany.

=== Religion ===
Eurostat's Eurobarometer survey in 2015, found that Christians comprised 81.4% of the total population; by denomination, Catholics were 37.1%, members of the Protestant Churches were 36.5%, members of other Christian denominations were 7.2%, the Christian Orthodox were 0.6%. Around 6.7% of the adult population themselves as agnostics or non believer, while 7.4% declared themselves as atheists. Muslims comprised 2.8% of the total population.

== Economy ==
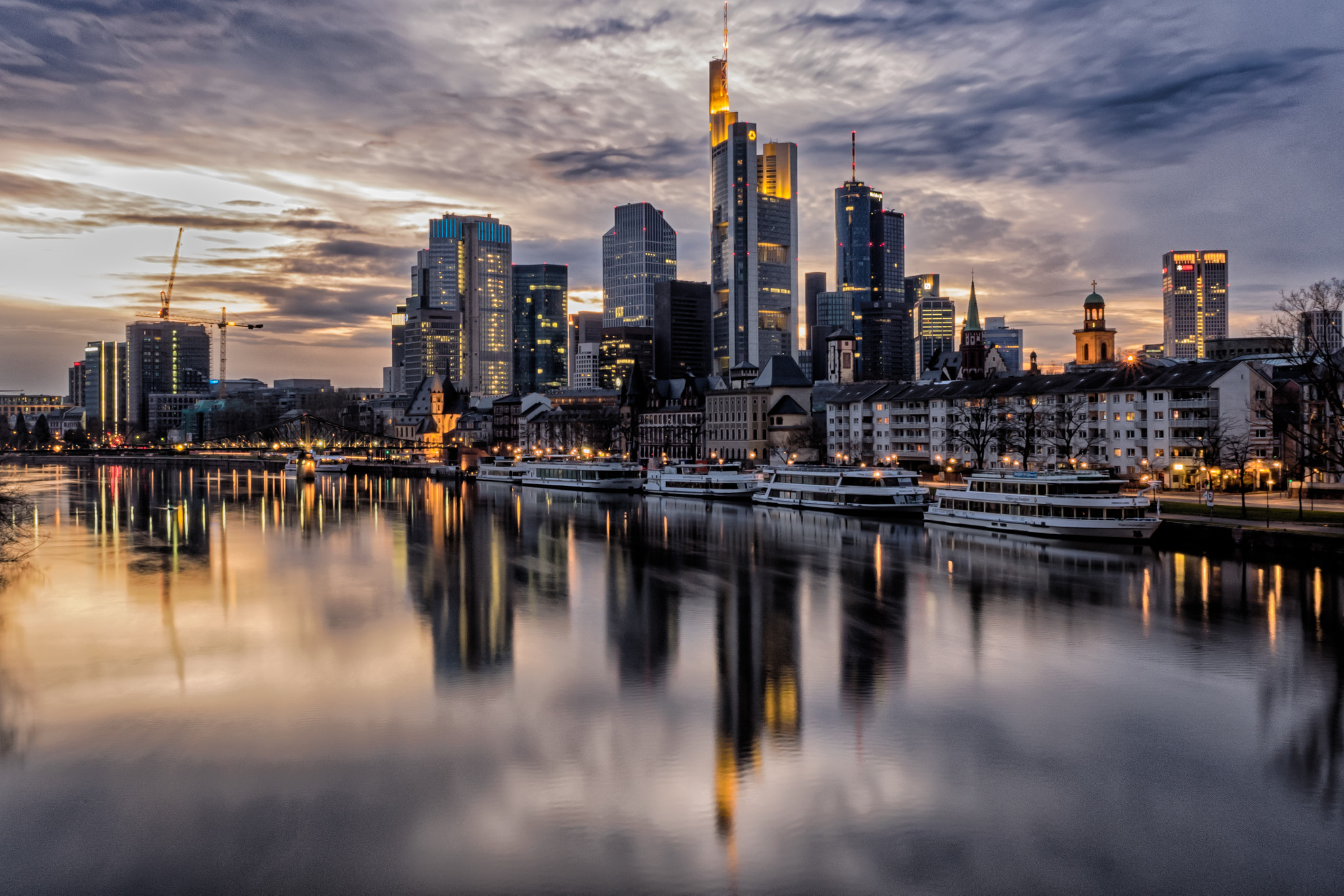
Frankfurt, the financial capital of Germany, was part of the former West Germany.

The standard of living and annual income remains significantly higher in the old states. In former West Germany, there is more income than in the East.

In former West Germany, there were smaller farms than in the east.

In the old states there are fewer unemployed than in the new states.

== Politics ==
In the West and West Berlin the Union, SPD, FDP and Greens are stronger, but right-wing populist parties and The Left are weaker than in the east.

From the 1950s to the 1980s there was a "two-party dominance" of the SPD and CDU.

According to a 1998–1999 study conducted at the University of Berlin, the potential for recruitment by right-wing extremist groups was estimated at 13% across Germany, with 12% in the West and 17% in the East. In the 2017 Federal Election, AfD reached ~ 22% in the East and ~ 11% in the West.

There is also a higher voter turnout in the West.

Social Democrats (SPD)

Free Democrats (FDP)

Alliance 90/The Greens (B90/Grünen)

Christian Democrats (CDU & CSU)
Alternative für Deutschland (AfD)

Die Linke

NPD

== See also ==
- New states of Germany
- Central Germany
- Wessi
