= List of country subdivisions by GDP =

List of country subdivisions by GDP may refer to:

- List of first-level administrative divisions by GRDP
- List of first-level administrative country subdivisions by nominal GDP per capita

== See also ==
- List of cities by GDP
- List of countries and dependencies by area
- Lists of political and geographic subdivisions by total area
- List of the largest country subdivisions by area
- List of first-level administrative divisions by population
- Lists of countries by GDP
