= List of first-level administrative divisions by area =

This is a list of first-level administrative divisions by area (including surface water) in square kilometres.

== Country subdivisions ==
=== 1,000,000 km^{2} (386,100 sq mi) and greater ===
Rank	Subnational flag	Coat of arms/seal	Common name (Note: When a subdivision has the same name as its capital city, the full official name of that subdivision is shown to not cause confusion.)	Capital	Largest city	Sovereign state	Area	Population	Rank within sovereign state	Population density	Map
-			Australian Antarctic Territory	Davis Station		Australia	5,896,500 km^{2} (2,276,700 sq mi)	less than 1000	-		
1			Sakha	Yakutsk		Russia	3,083,523 km^{2} (1,190,555 sq mi)	996,243	1st	0.32/km^{2} (0.83/sq mi)	
-			Queen Maud Land	none	Syowa Station	Norway	2,700,000 km^{2} (1,000,000 sq mi)	~40	-		
2			Western Australia	Perth		Australia	2,527,013 km^{2} (975,685 sq mi)	2,685,165	1st	1.06/km^{2} (2.7/sq mi)	
3			Krasnoyarsk Krai	Krasnoyarsk		Russia	2,366,797 km^{2} (913,825 sq mi) (Note: Includes the 897,900 km^{2} (346,700 sq mi) Taymyrsky Dolgano-Nenetsky District)	2,846,000	2nd	1.2/km^{2} (3.1/sq mi)	
4			Greenland	Nuuk		Danish Realm	2,166,086 km^{2} (836,330 sq mi)	56,081	1st	0.028/km^{2} (0.073/sq mi)	
5			Nunavut	Iqaluit		Canada	1,997,923 km^{2} (771,402 sq mi)	39,589	1st	0.02/km^{2} (0.052/sq mi)	
6			Queensland	Brisbane		Australia	1,729,742 km^{2} (667,857 sq mi)	5,240,520	2nd	2.83/km^{2} (7.3/sq mi)	
7			Alaska	Juneau	Anchorage	United States	1,723,337 km^{2} (665,384 sq mi)	733,391	1st	0.42/km^{2} (1.1/sq mi)	
8			Xinjiang	Ürümqi		China	1,664,897 km^{2} (642,820 sq mi)	25,852,345	1st	15.5/km^{2} (40/sq mi)	
9			Amazonas	Manaus		Brazil	1,570,746 km^{2} (606,468 sq mi)	4,269,995	1st	2.73/km^{2} (7.1/sq mi)	
10			Quebec	Quebec City	Montreal	Canada	1,542,056 km^{2} (595,391 sq mi)	8,631,147	2nd	6.23/km^{2} (16.1/sq mi)	
-			Magallanes and Chilean Antarctica Region	Punta Arenas		Chile	1,382,291 km^{2} (533,706 sq mi)	166,537		0.13/km^{2} (0.34/sq mi)	
11			Northern Territory	Darwin		Australia	1,347,791 km^{2} (520,385 sq mi)	245,865	3rd	0.17/km^{2} (0.44/sq mi)	
12			Northwest Territories	Yellowknife		Canada	1,346,106 km^{2} (519,734 sq mi) (Note: The area of the Northwest Territories in Canada was 3,439,296 km^{2} (1,327,920 sq mi), making it the world's largest subdivision, until 1999, when the territory of Nunavut was split off from the Northwest Territories.)	45,515	3rd	0.03/km^{2} (0.078/sq mi)	
13			Pará	Belém		Brazil	1,247,690 km^{2} (481,740 sq mi)	8,777,124	2nd	7.04/km^{2} (18.2/sq mi)	
14			Tibet	Lhasa		China	1,228,400 km^{2} (474,300 sq mi)	3,648,100	2nd	2.96/km^{2} (7.7/sq mi)	
15			Inner Mongolia	Hohhot		China	1,183,000 km^{2} (457,000 sq mi)	24,049,155	3rd	20.3/km^{2} (53/sq mi)	
16			Ontario	Toronto		Canada	1,076,395 km^{2} (415,598 sq mi)	14,915,270	4th	15.94/km^{2} (41.3/sq mi)	

=== 500,000–999,999 km^{2} (193,100–386,100 sq mi) ===
Rank	Subnational flag	Coat of arms/seal	Common name	Capital	Largest city	Sovereign state	Area	Population	Rank within sovereign state	Population density	Map
17			South Australia	Adelaide		Australia	984,321 km^{2} (380,048 sq mi)	1,772,787	4th	1.7/km^{2} (4.4/sq mi)	
18			British Columbia	Victoria	Vancouver	Canada	944,735 km^{2} (364,764 sq mi)	5,249,635	5th	5.41/km^{2} (14.0/sq mi)	
19			Mato Grosso	Cuiabá		Brazil	903,357 km^{2} (348,788 sq mi)	3,567,234	3rd	3.94/km^{2} (10.2/sq mi)	
20			New South Wales	Sydney		Australia	801,150 km^{2} (309,330 sq mi)	8,186,789	5th	10.1/km^{2} (26/sq mi)	
21			Khabarovsk Krai	Khabarovsk		Russia	787,633 km^{2} (304,107 sq mi)	1,283,992	3rd	1.63/km^{2} (4.2/sq mi)	
22			Irkutsk Oblast	Irkutsk		Russia	774,876 km^{2} (299,181 sq mi)	2,344,331	4th	3.03/km^{2} (7.8/sq mi)	
23			Yamalo-Nenets	Salekhard	Novy Urengoy	Russia	769,250 km^{2} (297,010 sq mi) (Note: The Tyumen Oblast contains the Khanty–Mansi and the Yamalo-Nenets Autonomous Okrugs, but all three are considered to be federal subjects of Russia. The total area for the oblast (with the autonomous okrugs included) is 1,433,270 km (890,590 mi).)	511,874	5th	0.67/km^{2} (1.7/sq mi)	
24			Chukotka	Anadyr		Russia	721,481 km^{2} (278,565 sq mi)	47,514	6th	0.07/km^{2} (0.18/sq mi)	
25			Qinghai	Xining		China	720,000 km^{2} (280,000 sq mi)	5,923,957	4th	8.2/km^{2} (21/sq mi)	
26			Texas	Austin	Houston	United States	695,662 km^{2} (268,597 sq mi)	29,145,505	2nd	41.86/km^{2} (108.4/sq mi)	
27			Eastern	Dammam		Saudi Arabia	672,522 km^{2} (259,662 sq mi)	5,148,598	1st	7.65/km^{2} (19.8/sq mi)	
28			Agadez Region	Agadez		Niger	667,799 km^{2} (257,839 sq mi)	566,447	1st	0.85/km^{2} (2.2/sq mi)	
29			Alberta	Edmonton	Calgary	Canada	661,849 km^{2} (255,541 sq mi)	4,464,170	6th	6.66/km^{2} (17.2/sq mi)	
30			Saskatchewan	Regina	Saskatoon	Canada	651,900 km^{2} (251,700 sq mi)	1,180,867	7th	1.91/km^{2} (4.9/sq mi)	
31			Manitoba	Winnipeg		Canada	647,797 km^{2} (250,116 sq mi)	1,386,333	8th	2.13/km^{2} (5.5/sq mi)	
32			Minas Gerais	Belo Horizonte		Brazil	586,528 km^{2} (226,460 sq mi)	21,411,923	4th	36.5/km^{2} (95/sq mi)	
33			Bahia	Salvador		Brazil	565,733 km^{2} (218,431 sq mi)	14,985,284	5th	26.5/km^{2} (69/sq mi)	
34			Khanty-Mansi	Khanty-Mansiysk	Surgut	Russia	534,801 km^{2} (206,488 sq mi)	1,729,472	7th	3.23/km^{2} (8.4/sq mi)	

=== 400,000–499,999 km^{2} (154,400–193,100 sq mi) ===
Rank	Subnational flag	Coat of arms/seal	Common name	Capital	Largest city	Sovereign state	Area	Population	Rank within sovereign state	Population density	Map
35			Sichuan	Chengdu		China	484,056 km^{2} (186,895 sq mi)	83,674,866	5th	172.5/km^{2} (447/sq mi)	
36			Yukon	Whitehorse		Canada	482,443 km^{2} (186,272 sq mi)	43,095	9th	0.08/km^{2} (0.21/sq mi)	
37			Heilongjiang	Harbin		China	472,766 km^{2} (182,536 sq mi)	31,850,088	6th	69.2/km^{2} (179/sq mi)	
38			Kamchatka	Petropavlovsk-Kamchatsky		Russia	464,275 km^{2} (179,258 sq mi)	289,033	8th	0.62/km^{2} (1.6/sq mi)	
39			Magadan Oblast	Magadan		Russia	462,464 km^{2} (178,558 sq mi)	134,568	9th	0.29/km^{2} (0.75/sq mi)	
40			Gansu	Lanzhou		China	457,382 km^{2} (176,596 sq mi)	25,019,831	7th	55.1/km^{2} (143/sq mi)	
41			Kufra	Al Jawf		Libya	453,611 km^{2} (175,140 sq mi) (Note: These figures cannot be verified by their Wikipedia page.)	50,104 (Note: as of 2006)	1st	0.1/km^{2} (0.26/sq mi)	
-			Ross Dependency	Scott Base	McMurdo Station	New Zealand	450,000 km^{2} (170,000 sq mi)	~2000	-		
42			New Valley	Kharga		Egypt	440,098 km^{2} (169,923 sq mi)	256,088	1st	0.58/km^{2} (1.5/sq mi)	
-			French Southern and Antarctic Lands	Saint-Pierre (Note: headquarters, not geographically assigned)	Port-aux-Français	France	439,666.4 km^{2} (169,756.1 sq mi)	400~800	-		
43			Zabaykalsky	Chita		Russia	431,892 km^{2} (166,754 sq mi)	992,202	10th	2.30/km^{2} (6.0/sq mi)	
44			California	Sacramento	Los Angeles	United States	423,970 km^{2} (163,700 sq mi)	39,538,223	3rd	93.2/km^{2} (241/sq mi)	
45			Komi	Syktyvkar		Russia	416,774 km^{2} (160,917 sq mi)	725,969	11th	1.74/km^{2} (4.5/sq mi)	
46			Arkhangelsk Oblast	Arkhangelsk		Russia	413,103 km^{2} (159,500 sq mi) (Note: The Arkhangelsk Oblast contains the Nenets Autonomous Okrug, but both are considered to be federal subjects of Russia. The total area for the oblast (with the autonomous okrug included) is 587,400 square kilometres (226,800 sq mi).)	964,131	12th	2.33/km^{2} (6.0/sq mi)	
47			Newfoundland and Labrador	St. John's		Canada	405,212 km^{2} (156,453 sq mi)	510,550	10th	1.37/km^{2} (3.5/sq mi)	
48			Riyadh Province	Riyadh		Saudi Arabia	404,240 km^{2} (156,080 sq mi)	8,216,284	2nd	20.3/km^{2} (53/sq mi)	

=== 300,000–399,999 km^{2} (115,800–154,400 sq mi) ===
Rank	Subnational flag	Coat of arms/seal	Common name	Capital	Largest city	Sovereign state	Area	Population	Rank within sovereign state	Population density	Map
50			Yunnan	Kunming		China	394,000 km^{2} (152,000 sq mi)	47,209,277	8th	123.20/km^{2} (319.1/sq mi)	
51			Montana	Helena	Billings	United States	380,800 km^{2} (147,000 sq mi)	1,085,407	4th	2.73/km^{2} (7.1/sq mi)	
52			Northern Cape	Kimberley	Upington	South Africa	372,889 km^{2} (143,973 sq mi)	1,292,786	1st	3.1/km^{2} (8.0/sq mi)	
53			Santa Cruz	Santa Cruz de la Sierra		Bolivia	370,621 km^{2} (143,098 sq mi)	3,370,100	1st	9.1/km^{2} (24/sq mi)	
54			Loreto	Iquitos		Peru	368,852 km^{2} (142,415 sq mi)	1,027,559	1st	2.8/km^{2} (7.3/sq mi)	
55			Amur	Blagoveshchensk		Russia	361,908 km^{2} (139,733 sq mi)	756,272	13th	2.09/km^{2} (5.4/sq mi)	
56			Mato Grosso do Sul	Campo Grande		Brazil	357,125 km^{2} (137,887 sq mi)	2,778,986	6th	6.9/km^{2} (18/sq mi)	
57			Oromia	Addis Ababa		Ethiopia	353,690 km^{2} (136,560 sq mi)	35,467,001	1st	66.5/km^{2} (172/sq mi)	
58			Buryatia	Ulan-Ude		Russia	351,334 km^{2} (135,651 sq mi)	975,247	14th	2.78/km^{2} (7.2/sq mi)	
59			Murzuq District	Murzuq		Libya	349,790 km^{2} (135,050 sq mi)	78,621	2nd	0.22/km^{2} (0.57/sq mi)	
60			Northern	Dongola		Sudan	348,765 km^{2} (134,659 sq mi)	833,743	1st	2.59/km^{2} (6.7/sq mi)	
61			Balochistan	Quetta		Pakistan	347,190 km^{2} (134,050 sq mi)	12,335,129	1st	36/km^{2} (93/sq mi)	
62			Rajasthan	Jaipur		India	342,239 km^{2} (132,139 sq mi)	68,548,437	1st	200/km^{2} (520/sq mi)	
63			Goiás	Goiânia		Brazil	340,086 km^{2} (131,308 sq mi)	7,018,354	7th	18/km^{2} (47/sq mi)	
64			Tamanrasset Province	Tamanrasset		Algeria	336,839 km^{2} (130,054 sq mi)	204,540 (Note: as of 2008)	1st	0.34/km^{2} (0.88/sq mi)	
65			Maranhão	Sao Luís		Brazil	331,983 km^{2} (128,179 sq mi)	7,075,181	8th	20/km^{2} (52/sq mi)	
66			Somali	Jijiga		Ethiopia	328,068 km^{2} (126,668 sq mi)	11,748,998	2nd	31/km^{2} (80/sq mi)	
67			New Mexico	Santa Fe	Albuquerque	United States	314,915 km^{2} (121,589 sq mi)	2,117,522	5th	6.6/km^{2} (17/sq mi)	
68			Tomsk Oblast	Tomsk		Russia	314,391 km^{2} (121,387 sq mi)	1,051,998	15th	3.35/km^{2} (8.7/sq mi)	
69			Madhya Pradesh	Bhopal	Indore	India	308,252 km^{2} (119,017 sq mi)	72,626,809	2nd	240/km^{2} (620/sq mi)	
70			Maharashtra	Mumbai		India	307,713 km^{2} (118,809 sq mi)	112,374,333	3rd	370/km^{2} (960/sq mi)	
71			Buenos Aires	La Plata		Argentina	307,571 km^{2} (118,754 sq mi)	17,569,053	1st	57/km^{2} (150/sq mi)	
72			Aktobe Region	Aktobe		Kazakhstan	300,629 km^{2} (116,074 sq mi)	909,673	1st	3.0/km^{2} (7.8/sq mi)	

=== 200,000–299,999 km^{2} (77,200–115,800 sq mi) ===
Rank	Subnational flag	Coat of arms/seal	Common name	Capital	Largest city	Sovereign state	Area	Population	Rank within sovereign state	Population density	Map
73			North Darfur	Al-Fashir		Sudan	296,420 km^{2} (114,450 sq mi)	1,583,179	2nd	5.0/km^{2} (13/sq mi)	
74			Arizona	Phoenix		United States	295,234 km^{2} (113,990 sq mi)	7,151,502	6th	24/km^{2} (62/sq mi)	
75			Nevada	Carson City	Las Vegas	United States	286,382 km^{2} (110,573 sq mi)	3,104,614	7th	10.8/km^{2} (28/sq mi)	
76			Rio Grande do Sul	Porto Alegre		Brazil	281,707 km^{2} (108,768 sq mi)	11,422,973	9th	41/km^{2} (110/sq mi)	
77			Tocantins	Palmas		Brazil	277,620 km^{2} (107,190 sq mi)	1,383,445	10th	5/km^{2}	
78			Borkou	Faya-Largeau		Chad	271,513 km^{2} (104,832 sq mi)	97,251	1st	0.4/km^{2} (1.0/sq mi)	
79			Colorado	Denver		United States	269,837 km^{2} (104,185 sq mi)	5,839,926	8th	21.72/km^{2} (56.3/sq mi)	
80			Adrar Province	Adrar		Algeria	261,258 km^{2} (100,872 sq mi)	402,197	2nd	0.95/km^{2} (2.5/sq mi)	
81			Oregon	Salem	Portland	United States	254,806 km^{2} (98,381 sq mi)	4,246,155	9th	15/km^{2} (39/sq mi)	
82			Wyoming	Cheyenne		United States	253,600 km^{2} (97,900 sq mi)	576,851	10th	2.31/km^{2} (6.0/sq mi)	
83			Tiris Zemmour	Zouérat		Mauritania	252,900 km^{2} (97,600 sq mi)	53,261	1st	0.21/km^{2} (0.54/sq mi)	
84			Piauí	Teresina		Brazil	251,578 km^{2} (97,135 sq mi)	3,289,290	11th	13.07/km^{2} (33.9/sq mi)	
85			Michigan	Lansing	Detroit	United States	250,493 km^{2} (96,716 sq mi)	10,077,331	11th	67.1/km^{2} (174/sq mi)	
86			São Paulo State	São Paulo		Brazil	248,219 km^{2} (95,838 sq mi)	46,649,132	12th	183.46/km^{2} (475.2/sq mi)	
87			Chihuahua	Chihuahua City		Mexico	247,460 km^{2} (95,540 sq mi)	3,741,869	1st	15/km^{2} (39/sq mi)	
88			Santa Cruz	Río Gallegos		Argentina	243,943 km^{2} (94,187 sq mi)	333,473	2nd	1.4/km^{2} (3.6/sq mi)	
89			Bolívar	Ciudad Bolívar		Venezuela	242,801 km^{2} (93,746 sq mi)	1,720,000	1st	7.08/km^{2} (18.3/sq mi)	
90			Uttar Pradesh	Lucknow		India	240,928 km^{2} (93,023 sq mi)	241,066,874	4th	1,001/km^{2} (2,590/sq mi)	
91			Karaganda Region	Karaganda		Kazakhstan	239,045 km^{2} (92,296 sq mi)	1,378,863	2nd	3.2/km^{2} (8.3/sq mi)	
92			Rondônia	Porto Velho		Brazil	237,765 km^{2} (91,802 sq mi)	1,562,409	13th	6.6/km^{2} (17/sq mi)	
93			Victoria	Melbourne		Australia	237,657 km^{2} (91,760 sq mi)	6,656,300	6th	29/km^{2} (75/sq mi)	
94			Guangxi	Nanning		China	237,600 km^{2} (91,700 sq mi)	50,126,804	9th	210/km^{2} (540/sq mi)	
95			Adrar	Atar		Mauritania	235,000 km^{2} (91,000 sq mi)	62,658	2nd	0.27/km^{2} (0.70/sq mi)	
96			Kyzylorda Region	Kyzylorda		Kazakhstan	226,019 km^{2} (87,266 sq mi)	823,251	3rd	3.6/km^{2} (9.3/sq mi)	
97			Minnesota	Saint Paul	Minneapolis	United States	225,163 km^{2} (86,936 sq mi)	5,717,184	12th	26.6/km^{2} (69/sq mi)	
98			Chubut	Rawson	Comodoro Rivadavia	Argentina	224,686 km^{2} (86,752 sq mi)	603,120	3rd	2.7/km^{2} (7.0/sq mi)	
99			Roraima	Boa Vista		Brazil	224,300 km^{2} (86,600 sq mi)	652,713	14th	2.91/km^{2} (7.5/sq mi)	
100			Moxico	Luena		Angola	223,023 km^{2} (86,110 sq mi)	758,568	1st	3.4/km^{2} (8.8/sq mi)	
101			Utah	Salt Lake City		United States	219,887 km^{2} (84,899 sq mi)	3,271,616	13th	14.12/km^{2} (36.6/sq mi)	
102			Red Sea State	Port Sudan		Sudan	218,887 km^{2} (84,513 sq mi)	1,482,053	3rd	6.6/km^{2} (17/sq mi)	
103			Idaho	Boise		United States	216,443 km^{2} (83,569 sq mi)	1,975,000	14th	8.33/km^{2} (21.6/sq mi)	
104			Beni	Trinidad		Bolivia	213,564 km^{2} (82,458 sq mi)	421,196	2nd	2.0/km^{2} (5.2/sq mi)	
105			Kansas	Topeka	Wichita	United States	213,100 km^{2} (82,300 sq mi)	2,940,865	15th	13.5/km^{2} (35/sq mi)	
106			Puntland	Garoowe	Bosaso	Somalia	212,510 km^{2} (82,050 sq mi)	6,334,633	1st	29.8/km^{2} (77/sq mi)	
107			Matrouh	Mersa Matruh		Egypt	212,112 km^{2} (81,897 sq mi)	538,546	2nd	2.5/km^{2} (6.5/sq mi)	
108			Hunan	Changsha		China	211,842 km^{2} (81,793 sq mi)	66,444,864	10th	320/km^{2} (830/sq mi)	
109			Shaanxi	Xi'an		China	205,624 km^{2} (79,392 sq mi)	39,530,000	11th	190/km^{2} (490/sq mi)	
110			Punjab	Lahore		Pakistan	205,344 km^{2} (79,284 sq mi)	127,474,000	2nd	620/km^{2} (1,600/sq mi)	
111			Red Sea Governorate	Hurghada		Egypt	203,685 km^{2} (78,643 sq mi)	400,069	3rd	2.0/km^{2} (5.2/sq mi)	
112			Río Negro	Viedma	Bariloche	Argentina	203,013 km^{2} (78,384 sq mi)	762,067	4th	3.8/km^{2} (9.8/sq mi)	
113			Nebraska	Lincoln	Omaha	United States	200,356 km^{2} (77,358 sq mi)	1,961,504	16th	9.62/km^{2} (24.9/sq mi)	

=== 150,000–199,999 km^{2} (57,900–77,200 sq mi) ===
Rank	Subnational flag	Coat of arms/seal	Common name	Capital	Largest city	Sovereign state	Area	Population	Rank within sovereign state	Population density	Map
114			South Dakota	Pierre	Sioux Falls	United States	199,729 km^{2} (77,116 sq mi)	909,824	17th	4.44/km^{2} (11.5/sq mi)	
115			Tshopo	Kisangani		Congo-Kinshasa	199,567 km^{2} (77,053 sq mi)	2,614,630	1st	13/km^{2} (34/sq mi)	
116			Paraná	Curitiba		Brazil	199,298 km^{2} (76,949 sq mi)	11,597,484	15th	58/km^{2} (150/sq mi)	
117			Cuando Cubango	Menongue		Angola	199,049 km^{2} (76,853 sq mi)	534,002	2nd	2.7/km^{2} (7.0/sq mi)	
118			Illizi Province	Illizi		Algeria	198,815 km^{2} (76,763 sq mi)	52,333	3rd	0.18/km^{2} (0.47/sq mi)	
119			Gujarat	Gandhinagar	Ahmedabad	India	196,024 km^{2} (75,685 sq mi)	60,439,692	5th	308/km^{2} (800/sq mi)	
120			Kostanay Region	Kostanay		Kazakhstan	196,001 km^{2} (75,676 sq mi)	835,686	4th	4.3/km^{2} (11/sq mi)	
121			Ouargla Province	Ouargla		Algeria	194,552 km^{2} (75,117 sq mi)	552,539	4th	2.6/km^{2} (6.7/sq mi)	
122			Sverdlovsk	Yekaterinburg		Russia	194,226 km^{2} (74,991 sq mi)	4,239,311	16th	21.82/km^{2} (56.5/sq mi)	
123			Karnataka	Bangalore		India	191,791 km^{2} (74,051 sq mi)	61,130,704	6th	320/km^{2} (830/sq mi)	
124			Hadramout	Mukalla		Yemen	191,737 km^{2} (74,030 sq mi)	2,255,000	1st	12/km^{2} (31/sq mi)	
125			Ulytau	Jezkazgan		Kazakhstan	188,900 km^{2} (72,900 sq mi)	221,014	5th	1.17/km^{2} (3.0/sq mi)	
126			Hebei	Shijiazhuang		China	188,800 km^{2} (72,900 sq mi)	74,610,235	12th	400/km^{2} (1,000/sq mi)	
127			Jilin	Changchun		China	187,400 km^{2} (72,400 sq mi)	24,073,453	13th	130/km^{2} (340/sq mi)	
128			Hubei	Wuhan		China	185,900 km^{2} (71,800 sq mi)	58,300,000	14th	310/km^{2} (800/sq mi)	
129			Abai	Semey		Kazakhstan	185,500 km^{2} (71,600 sq mi)	610,183	6th	3.29/km^{2} (8.5/sq mi)	
130			North Kordofan	El Obeid		Sudan	185,302 km^{2} (71,546 sq mi)	2,529,370	4th	13/km^{2} (34/sq mi)	
131			Washington	Olympia	Seattle	United States	184,827 km^{2} (71,362 sq mi)	7,785,786	18th	39.6/km^{2} (103/sq mi)	
132			Amazonas	Puerto Ayacucho		Venezuela	183,500 km^{2} (70,800 sq mi)	146,480	2nd	1.25/km^{2} (3.2/sq mi)	
133			Kerman Province	Kerman		Iran	183,285 km^{2} (70,767 sq mi)	3,164,718	1st	17/km^{2} (44/sq mi)	
134			North Dakota	Bismarck	Fargo	United States	183,123 km^{2} (70,704 sq mi)	779,261	19th	4.13/km^{2} (10.7/sq mi)	
135			Hodh Ech Chargui	Néma		Mauritania	182,700 km^{2} (70,500 sq mi)	430,668	3rd	2.4/km^{2} (6.2/sq mi)	
136			Oklahoma	Oklahoma City		United States	181,038 km^{2} (69,899 sq mi)	4,019,800	20th	21.30/km^{2} (55.2/sq mi)	
137			Sistan and Baluchestan	Zahedan		Iran	180,726 km^{2} (69,779 sq mi)	2,775,014	2nd	15/km^{2} (39/sq mi)	
138			Missouri	Jefferson City	Kansas City	United States	180,560 km^{2} (69,710 sq mi)	6,160,281	21st	34.1/km^{2} (88/sq mi)	
139			Guangdong	Guangzhou		China	179,800 km^{2} (69,400 sq mi)	126,012,510	15th	700/km^{2} (1,800/sq mi)	
140			Sonora	Hermosillo		Mexico	179,355 km^{2} (69,249 sq mi)	2,944,840	2nd	16/km^{2} (41/sq mi)	
141			Novosibirsk Oblast	Novosibirsk		Russia	178,200 km^{2} (68,800 sq mi)	2,794,315	17th	15.72/km^{2} (40.7/sq mi)	
–			Somaliland	Hargeisa		Somalia (de jure)	177,000 km^{2} (68,000 sq mi)	5,741,086	2nd	28.27/km^{2} (73.2/sq mi)	
142			Nenets	Naryan-Mar		Russia	176,700 km^{2} (68,200 sq mi)	41,454	18th	0.23/km^{2} (0.60/sq mi)	
143			Guizhou	Guiyang		China	176,167 km^{2} (68,018 sq mi)	38,562,148	16th	220/km^{2} (570/sq mi)	
144			Karelia	Petrozavodsk		Russia	172,400 km^{2} (66,600 sq mi)	527,821	19th	2.92/km^{2} (7.6/sq mi)	
145			Tuva	Kyzyl		Russia	170,500 km^{2} (65,800 sq mi)	337,299	20th	2.0/km^{2} (5.2/sq mi)	
146			Florida	Tallahassee	Jacksonville	United States	170,312 km^{2} (65,758 sq mi)	22,244,823	22nd	160/km^{2} (410/sq mi)	
147			Altai Krai	Barnaul		Russia	169,100 km^{2} (65,300 sq mi)	2,131,019	21st	12.68/km^{2} (32.8/sq mi)	
148			Wisconsin	Madison	Milwaukee	United States	169,640 km^{2} (65,500 sq mi)	5,893,718	23rd	42/km^{2} (110/sq mi)	
149			Eastern Cape	Bhisho	Gqeberha	South Africa	168,966 km^{2} (65,238 sq mi)	6,562,053	2nd	39/km^{2} (100/sq mi)	
150			Jiangxi	Nanchang		China	166,919 km^{2} (64,448 sq mi)	45,188,635	17th	270/km^{2} (700/sq mi)	
151			Karakalpakstan	Nukus		Uzbekistan	166,590 km^{2} (64,320 sq mi)	1,923,734	1st	11.55/km^{2} (29.9/sq mi)	
152			Primorsky	Vladivostok		Russia	165,900 km^{2} (64,100 sq mi)	1,820,125	22nd	11.05/km^{2} (28.6/sq mi)	
153			Mangystau	Aktau		Kazakhstan	165,642 km^{2} (63,955 sq mi)	745,909	7th	4.5/km^{2} (12/sq mi)	
154			Henan	Zhengzhou		China	165,467 km^{2} (63,887 sq mi)	99,365,519	18th	600/km^{2} (1,600/sq mi)	
155			Ömnögovi	Dalanzadgad		Mongolia	165,380 km^{2} (63,850 sq mi)	65,645	1st	0.40/km^{2} (1.0/sq mi)	
156			Córdoba Province	Córdoba		Argentina	165,321 km^{2} (63,831 sq mi)	3,978,984	5th	24/km^{2} (62/sq mi)	
157			Acre	Rio Branco		Brazil	164,123 km^{2} (63,368 sq mi)	906,876	16th	5.1/km^{2} (13/sq mi)	
158			Andhra Pradesh	Amaravati	Visakhapatnam	India	162,970 km^{2} (62,920 sq mi)	49,577,103	7th	304/km^{2} (790/sq mi)	
159			ǁKaras	Keetmanshoop		Namibia	161,514 km^{2} (62,361 sq mi)	77,421	1st	0.48/km^{2} (1.2/sq mi)	
160			Perm Krai	Perm		Russia	160,600 km^{2} (62,000 sq mi)	2,508,239	23rd	15.65/km^{2} (40.5/sq mi)	
–			Guayana Esequiba	Tumeremo		Venezuela (disputed)	159,542 km^{2} (61,600 sq mi)	128,000	3rd	0.8/km^{2} (2.1/sq mi)	
161			Tindouf Province	Tindouf		Algeria	159,000 km^{2} (61,000 sq mi)	49,149	5th	0.31/km^{2} (0.80/sq mi)	
162			Shandong	Jinan	Qingdao	China	157,100 km^{2} (60,700 sq mi)	101,527,453	19th	650/km^{2} (1,700/sq mi)	
163			Diffa Region	Diffa		Niger	156,906 km^{2} (60,582 sq mi)	593,821	2nd	3.8/km^{2} (9.8/sq mi)	
164			Shanxi	Taiyuan		China	156,000 km^{2} (60,000 sq mi)	34,915,616	20th	220/km^{2} (570/sq mi)	
165			Shan	Taunggyi		Myanmar	155,801 km^{2} (60,155 sq mi)	5,824,432	1st	37/km^{2} (96/sq mi)	
166			Odisha	Bhubaneswar		India	155,707 km^{2} (60,119 sq mi)	41,974,218	8th	269/km^{2} (700/sq mi)	
167			Salta Province	Salta		Argentina	155,488 km^{2} (60,034 sq mi)	1,440,672	6th	9.3/km^{2} (24/sq mi)	
168			Amhara	Bahir Dar		Ethiopia	154,708 km^{2} (59,733 sq mi)	21,134,988	3rd	136/km^{2} (350/sq mi)	
169			Georgia	Atlanta		United States	153,909 km^{2} (59,425 sq mi)	10,711,908	24th	71.5/km^{2} (185/sq mi)	
170			Central Kalimantan	Palangka Raya		Indonesia	153,443 km^{2} (59,245 sq mi)	2,741,075	1st	18/km^{2} (47/sq mi)	
171			Mecca Province	Mecca	Jeddah	Saudi Arabia	153,148 km^{2} (59,131 sq mi)	8,557,766	3rd	56/km^{2} (150/sq mi)	
172			Medina Province	Medina		Saudi Arabia	151,990 km^{2} (58,680 sq mi)	2,132,679	4th	14/km^{2} (36/sq mi)	
173			South Khorasan	Birjand		Iran	151,913 km^{2} (58,654 sq mi)	768,898	3rd	5.1/km^{2} (13/sq mi)	
174			Coahuila	Saltillo		Mexico	151,595 km^{2} (58,531 sq mi)	3,146,771	3rd	21/km^{2} (54/sq mi)	
175			Kidal Region	Kidal		Mali	151,450 km^{2} (58,480 sq mi)	67,638	2nd	0.45/km^{2} (1.2/sq mi)	
176			West Kazakhstan	Oral		Kazakhstan	151,339 km^{2} (58,432 sq mi)	683,327	8th	4.5/km^{2} (12/sq mi)	

=== 100,000–149,999 km^{2} (38,600–57,900 sq mi) ===
Rank	Subnational flag	Coat of arms/seal	Common name	Capital	Largest city	Sovereign state	Area	Population	Rank within sovereign state	Population density	Map
177			Illinois	Springfield	Chicago	United States	149,997 km^{2} (57,914 sq mi)	12,812,508	25th	89.4/km^{2} (232/sq mi)	
178			Najran Province	Najran		Saudi Arabia	149,511 km^{2} (57,727 sq mi)	505,652	5th	3.4/km^{2} (8.8/sq mi)	
179			Ceará	Fortaleza		Brazil	148,894 km^{2} (57,488 sq mi)	9,240,580	17th	62.06/km^{2} (160.7/sq mi)	
180			Mendoza Province	Mendoza	Guaymallén	Argentina	148,827 km^{2} (57,462 sq mi)	2,014,533	7th	14/km^{2} (36/sq mi)	
181			Bas-Uélé	Buta		Congo-Kinshasa	148,331 km^{2} (57,271 sq mi)	1,093,845	2nd	7.4/km^{2} (19/sq mi)	
182			Central	Serowe		Botswana	147,730 km^{2} (57,040 sq mi)	638,604	1st	4.3/km^{2} (11/sq mi)	
183			West Kalimantan	Pontianak		Indonesia	147,307 km^{2} (56,876 sq mi)	5,541,376	2nd	38/km^{2} (98/sq mi)	
184			Akmola	Kokshetau		Kazakhstan	146,219 km^{2} (56,455 sq mi)	785,219	9th	5.4/km^{2} (14/sq mi)	
185			Tabuk Province	Tabuk		Saudi Arabia	146,072 km^{2} (56,399 sq mi)	910,030	6th	6.2/km^{2} (16/sq mi)	
186			Liaoning	Shenyang		China	145,900 km^{2} (56,300 sq mi)	42,591,407	21st	290/km^{2} (750/sq mi)	
187			Iowa	Des Moines		United States	144,669 km^{2} (55,857 sq mi)	3,190,369	26th	22.0/km^{2} (57/sq mi)	
188			Vologda Oblast	Vologda		Russia	145,700 km^{2} (56,300 sq mi)	1,128,580	24th	7.81/km^{2} (20.2/sq mi)	
189			Zinder Region	Zinder		Niger	145,430 km^{2} (56,150 sq mi)	3,539,764	3rd	24/km^{2} (62/sq mi)	
190			Murmansk Oblast	Murmansk		Russia	144,900 km^{2} (55,900 sq mi)	657,950	25th	4.54/km^{2} (11.8/sq mi)	
191			Jambyl	Taraz		Kazakhstan	144,264 km^{2} (55,701 sq mi)	1,209,665	10th	8.4/km^{2} (22/sq mi)	
192			Tyumen Oblast	Tyumen		Russia	143,520 km^{2} (55,410 sq mi)	1,607,274	26th	10.04/km^{2} (26.0/sq mi)	
193			La Pampa	Santa Rosa		Argentina	143,440 km^{2} (55,380 sq mi)	366,022	8th	2.6/km^{2} (6.7/sq mi)	
194			Bashkortostan	Ufa		Russia	142,947 km^{2} (55,192 sq mi)	4,080,684	27th	28.55/km^{2} (73.9/sq mi)	
195			Dakhla-Oued; Ed-Dahab	Dakhla		Morocco (de facto)	142,865 km^{2} (55,160 sq mi)	142,955	1st	4.0/km^{2} (10/sq mi)	
196			Amapá	Macapá		Brazil	142,829 km^{2} (55,147 sq mi)	877,613	18th	6.14/km^{2} (15.9/sq mi)	
197			Govi-Altai	Altai City		Mongolia	141,447 km^{2} (54,613 sq mi)	57,440	2nd	0.41/km^{2} (1.1/sq mi)	
198			New York	Albany	New York City	United States	141,297 km^{2} (54,555 sq mi)	20,215,751	27th	159/km^{2} (410/sq mi)	
199			Sindh	Karachi		Pakistan	140,914 km^{2} (54,407 sq mi)	47,886,051	3rd	339.82/km^{2} (880.1/sq mi)	
200			Anhui	Hefei		China	140,200 km^{2} (54,100 sq mi)	61,027,171	22nd	440/km^{2} (1,100/sq mi)	
201			Laâyoune-Sakia; El Hamra	Laayoune		Morocco (de facto)	140,018 km^{2} (54,061 sq mi)	367,758	2nd	2.6/km^{2} (6.7/sq mi)	
202			Omsk Oblast	Omsk		Russia	139,700 km^{2} (53,900 sq mi)	1,831,881	28th	12.98/km^{2} (33.6/sq mi)	
203			North Carolina	Raleigh	Charlotte	United States	139,391 km^{2} (53,819 sq mi)	10,698,973	28th	84.80/km^{2} (219.6/sq mi)	
204			Balkan	Balkanabat		Turkmenistan	139,270 km^{2} (53,770 sq mi)	553,500	1st	4.0/km^{2} (10/sq mi)	
205			Al Anbar	Ramadi		Iraq	138,501 km^{2} (53,476 sq mi)	1,771,656	1st	13/km^{2} (34/sq mi)	
206			Arkansas	Little Rock		United States	137,732 km^{2} (53,179 sq mi)	3,013,756	29th	21.8/km^{2} (56/sq mi)	
207			Santiago del Estero Province	Santiago del Estero		Argentina	136,351 km^{2} (52,645 sq mi)	1,054,028	9th	7.7/km^{2} (20/sq mi)	
208			Tibesti	Bardai		Chad	135,896 km^{2} (52,470 sq mi)	37,890	2nd	0.2/km^{2} (0.52/sq mi)	
209			Alabama	Montgomery	Huntsville	United States	135,765 km^{2} (52,419 sq mi)	5,039,877	30th	38.4/km^{2} (99/sq mi)	
210			Louisiana	Baton Rouge	New Orleans	United States	135,382 km^{2} (52,271 sq mi)	4,657,757	31st	41.3/km^{2} (107/sq mi)	
211			Chhattisgarh	Raipur		India	135,192 km^{2} (52,198 sq mi)	29,436,231	9th	220/km^{2} (570/sq mi)	
212			Tanganyika	Kalemie		Congo-Kinshasa	134,940 km^{2} (52,100 sq mi)	3,062,000	3rd	23/km^{2} (60/sq mi)	
213			La Paz Department	La Paz		Bolivia	133,985 km^{2} (51,732 sq mi)	2,927,000	3rd	22/km^{2} (57/sq mi)	
214			Santa Fe Province	Santa Fe	Rosario	Argentina	133,007 km^{2} (51,354 sq mi)	3,556,522	10th	27/km^{2} (70/sq mi)	
215			Tshuapa	Boende		Congo-Kinshasa	132,940 km^{2} (51,330 sq mi)	1,316,855	4th	9.9/km^{2} (26/sq mi)	
216			England	London		United Kingdom	132,932 km^{2} (51,325 sq mi)	56,489,800	1st	434/km^{2} (1,120/sq mi)	
217			Maniema	Kindu		Congo-Kinshasa	132,520 km^{2} (51,170 sq mi)	2,049,300	5th	15/km^{2} (39/sq mi)	
218			Haut-Katanga	Lubumbashi		Congo-Kinshasa	132,425 km^{2} (51,130 sq mi)	4,617,000	6th	35/km^{2} (91/sq mi)	
219			Magallanes	Punta Arenas		Chile	132,291 km^{2} (51,078 sq mi)	165,593	1st	1.3/km^{2} (3.4/sq mi)	
220			In Salah Province	In Salah		Algeria	131,220 km^{2} (50,660 sq mi)	50,392	6th	0.38/km^{2} (0.98/sq mi)	
221			Sipaliwini		Kwamalasamutu	Suriname	130,567 km^{2} (50,412 sq mi)	37,065	1st	0.28/km^{2} (0.73/sq mi)	
222			Tamil Nadu	Chennai		India	130,058 km^{2} (50,216 sq mi)	72,147,030	10th	550/km^{2} (1,400/sq mi)	
223			Free State	Bloemfontein		South Africa	129,825 km^{2} (50,126 sq mi)	2,921,611	3rd	22.5/km^{2} (58/sq mi)	
224			Western Cape	Cape Town		South Africa	129,462 km^{2} (49,986 sq mi)	7,212,142	4th	55.7/km^{2} (144/sq mi)	
225			Niassa	Lichinga		Mozambique	129,056 km^{2} (49,829 sq mi)	1,865,976	1st	14/km^{2} (36/sq mi)	
226			Mai-Ndombe	Inongo		Congo-Kinshasa	127,465 km^{2} (49,215 sq mi)	1,768,327	7th	14/km^{2} (36/sq mi)	
227			East Kalimantan	Samarinda		Indonesia	127,346 km^{2} (49,169 sq mi)	3,859,783	3rd	30/km^{2} (78/sq mi)	
228			South Darfur	Nyala		Sudan	127,300 km^{2} (49,200 sq mi)	2,890,348	5th	22.7/km^{2} (59/sq mi)	
229			Western	Mongu		Zambia	126,386 km^{2} (48,798 sq mi)	991,500	1st	7.8/km^{2} (20/sq mi)	
230			Antofagasta Region	Antofagasta		Chile	126,049 km^{2} (48,668 sq mi)	599,335	2nd	4.8/km^{2} (12/sq mi)	
231			North-Western	Solwezi		Zambia	125,826 km^{2} (48,582 sq mi)	833,818	2nd	6.6/km^{2} (17/sq mi)	
232			Limpopo	Polokwane		South Africa	125,754 km^{2} (48,554 sq mi)	5,941,439	5th	47.2/km^{2} (122/sq mi)	
233			Mississippi	Jackson		United States	125,443 km^{2} (48,434 sq mi)	2,963,914	32nd	24.5/km^{2} (63/sq mi)	
234			Pavlodar Region	Pavlodar		Kazakhstan	124,800 km^{2} (48,200 sq mi)	756,511	11th	6.1/km^{2} (16/sq mi)	
235			Sarawak	Kuching		Malaysia	124,450 km^{2} (48,050 sq mi)	2,453,677	1st	20/km^{2} (52/sq mi)	
236			Orenburg Oblast	Orenburg		Russia	124,000 km^{2} (48,000 sq mi)	1,841,601	29th	14.89/km^{2} (38.6/sq mi)	
237			Dornod	Choibalsan		Mongolia	123,597 km^{2} (47,721 sq mi)	82,054	3rd	0.66/km^{2} (1.7/sq mi)	
238			Durango	Victoria de Durango		Mexico	123,317 km^{2} (47,613 sq mi)	1,832,650	4th	15/km^{2} (39/sq mi)	
239			Fars	Shiraz		Iran	122,608 km^{2} (47,339 sq mi)	4,851,274	4th	40/km^{2} (100/sq mi)	
240			River Nile	Ad-Damir		Sudan	122,123 km^{2} (47,152 sq mi)	1,472,257	6th	13/km^{2} (34/sq mi)	
241			Fujian	Fuzhou	Quanzhou	China	121,400 km^{2} (46,900 sq mi)	41,540,086	23rd	340/km^{2} (880/sq mi)	
242			Lualaba	Kolwezi		Congo-Kinshasa	121,308 km^{2} (46,837 sq mi)	1,677,288	8th	14/km^{2} (36/sq mi)	
243			Kirov Oblast	Kirov		Russia	120,800 km^{2} (46,600 sq mi)	1,138,200	30th	9.46/km^{2} (24.5/sq mi)	
244			Bordj Baji Mokhtar Province	Bordj Badji Mokhtar		Algeria	120,026 km^{2} (46,342 sq mi)	16,437	7th	0.14/km^{2} (0.36/sq mi)	
245			Hirshabelle	Jowhar	Beledweyne	Somalia	120,000 km^{2} (46,000 sq mi)	3,771,638	3rd	31/km^{2} (80/sq mi)	
246			Kayes Region	Kayes		Mali	119,743 km^{2} (46,233 sq mi)	1,996,812	3rd	17/km^{2} (44/sq mi)	
247			Pennsylvania	Harrisburg	Philadelphia	United States	119,283 km^{2} (46,055 sq mi)	13,002,700	33rd	112/km^{2} (290/sq mi)	
248			Razavi Khorasan	Mashhad		Iran	118,884 km^{2} (45,901 sq mi)	6,444,000	5th	54.12/km^{2} (140.2/sq mi)	
249			Atyrau Region	Atyrau		Kazakhstan	118,631 km^{2} (45,804 sq mi)	681,241	12th	5.7/km^{2} (15/sq mi)	
250			Jetisu	Taldykorgan		Kazakhstan	118,500 km^{2} (45,800 sq mi)	650,000	13th	5.48/km^{2} (14.2/sq mi)	
251			Potosí Department	Potosí		Bolivia	118,218 km^{2} (45,644 sq mi)	901,555	4th	6.97/km^{2} (18.1/sq mi)	
252			Ghanzi District	Ghanzi		Botswana	117,910 km^{2} (45,530 sq mi)	56,555	2nd	1.3/km^{2} (3.4/sq mi)	
253			South Papua	Salor	Merauke	Indonesia	117,849 km^{2} (45,502 sq mi)	522,215	4th	4.4/km^{2} (11/sq mi)	
254			Ennedi-Ouest	Fada		Chad	117,686 km^{2} (45,439 sq mi)	59,744	3rd	0.7/km^{2} (1.8/sq mi)	
255			Jufra	Hun		Libya	117,410 km^{2} (45,330 sq mi)	52,342	3rd	0.45/km^{2} (1.2/sq mi)	
256			Turkistan Region	Turkistan		Kazakhstan	117,249 km^{2} (45,270 sq mi)	2,685,009	14th	23/km^{2} (60/sq mi)	
257			Ohio	Columbus		United States	116,096 km^{2} (44,825 sq mi)	11,780,017	34th	109/km^{2} (280/sq mi)	
258			Bayankhongor Province	Bayankhongor		Mongolia	115,977 km^{2} (44,779 sq mi)	87,243	4th	0.75/km^{2} (1.9/sq mi)	
259			Kunene	Opuwo		Namibia	115,260 km^{2} (44,500 sq mi)	86,856	2nd	0.8/km^{2} (2.1/sq mi)	
260			Tahoua Region	Tahoua		Niger	113,371 km^{2} (43,773 sq mi)	4,692,990	4th	26/km^{2} (67/sq mi)	
261			Volgograd Oblast	Volgograd		Russia	113,900 km^{2} (44,000 sq mi)	2,468,877	31st	21.87/km^{2} (56.6/sq mi)	
262			Telangana	Hyderabad		India	112,077 km^{2} (43,273 sq mi)	35,193,978	11th	312/km^{2} (810/sq mi)	
263			Northern Borders	Arar		Saudi Arabia	111,797	365,231	7th	3.4/km2	
264			Navoiy Region	Navoiy		Uzbekistan	111,095 km^{2} (42,894 sq mi)	1,033,857	2nd	9.3/km^{2} (24/sq mi)	
265			Virginia	Richmond	Virginia Beach	United States	110,785 km^{2} (42,774 sq mi)	8,683,619	35th	84.7/km^{2} (219/sq mi)	
266			Central	Kabwe		Zambia	110,450 km^{2} (42,640 sq mi)	1,743,999	3rd	16/km^{2} (41/sq mi)	
267			Jubaland	Bu'ale	Kismayo	Somalia	110,293 km^{2} (42,584 sq mi)	1,360,633	4th	12/km^{2} (31/sq mi)	
268			Hardap	Mariental		Namibia	109,781 km^{2} (42,387 sq mi)	79,507	3rd	0.7/km^{2} (1.8/sq mi)	
269			Amazonas	Leticia		Colombia	109,665 km^{2} (42,342 sq mi)	76,589	1st	0.70/km^{2} (1.8/sq mi)	
270			Dornogovi	Sainshand		Mongolia	109,472 km^{2} (42,267 sq mi)	68,192	5th	0.62/km^{2} (1.6/sq mi)	
271			Tennessee	Nashville		United States	109,247 km^{2} (42,181 sq mi)	6,910,840	36th	63.3/km^{2} (164/sq mi)	
272			North-West	Maun		Botswana	109,130 km^{2} (42,140 sq mi)	198,436	3rd	1.3/km^{2} (3.4/sq mi)	
273			East	Bertoua		Cameroon	109,002 km^{2} (42,086 sq mi)	835,642	1st	7.7/km^{2} (20/sq mi)	
274			Aysén	Coyhaique		Chile	108,494 km^{2} (41,890 sq mi)	102,317	3rd	0.94/km^{2} (2.4/sq mi)	
275			Haut-Lomami	Kamina		Congo-Kinshasa	108,204 km^{2} (41,778 sq mi)	3,444,000	9th	23/km^{2} (60/sq mi)	
276			Isfahan Province	Isfahan		Iran	107,029 km^{2} (41,324 sq mi)	5,136,000	6th	47.85/km^{2} (123.9/sq mi)	
277			Al Wahat	Ajdabiya		Libya	105,523 km^{2} (40,743 sq mi)	164,718	4th	1.56/km^{2} (4.0/sq mi)	
278			Otjozondjupa	Otjiwarongo		Namibia	105,460 km^{2} (40,720 sq mi)	143,903	4th	1.4/km^{2} (3.6/sq mi)	
279			Kgalagadi	Tsabong		Botswana	105,200 km^{2} (40,600 sq mi)	58,857	4th	0.5/km^{2} (1.3/sq mi)	
280			Almaty Region (Note: Not to be confused with Almaty.)	Qonayev		Kazakhstan	105,100 km^{2} (40,600 sq mi)	2,059,200	15th	9.2/km^{2} (24/sq mi)	
281			North West	Mafikeng	Rustenburg	South Africa	125,754 km^{2} (48,554 sq mi)	5,941,439	6th	47.2/km^{2} (122/sq mi)	
282			Kentucky	Frankfort	Louisville	United States	104,656 km^{2} (40,408 sq mi)	4,509,342	37th	44/km^{2} (110/sq mi)	
283			Sankuru	Lusambo		Congo-Kinshasa	104,331 km^{2} (40,282 sq mi)	2,417,000	10th	13/km^{2} (34/sq mi)	
284			Équateur	Mbandaka		Congo-Kinshasa	103,902 km^{2} (40,117 sq mi)	1,712,000	11th	16/km^{2} (41/sq mi)	
285			North East State	Las Anod		Somalia	103,897 km^{2} (40,115 sq mi)	2,500,000	5th	?/km^{2}	
286			Ḥa'il Province	Ḥaʼil		Saudi Arabia	103,887 km^{2} (40,111 sq mi)	699,774	8th	6.7/km^{2} (17/sq mi)	
287			Zambezia	Quelimane		Mozambique	103,478 km^{2} (39,953 sq mi)	5,110,787	2nd	49/km^{2} (130/sq mi)	
288			Catamarca	San Fernando del Valle de Catamarca		Argentina	102,602 km^{2} (39,615 sq mi)	429,556	11th	4.18/km^{2} (10.8/sq mi)	
289			Lunda Norte	Dundo		Angola	102,783 km^{2} (39,685 sq mi)	862,566	3rd	8.3/km^{2} (21/sq mi)	
290			Jiangsu	Nanjing	Suzhou	China	102,600 km^{2} (39,600 sq mi)	84,748,016	24th	830/km^{2} (2,100/sq mi)	
291			Ucayali	Pucallpa		Peru	101,831 km^{2} (39,317 sq mi)	415,000	2nd	4.0/km^{2} (10/sq mi)	
292			Zhejiang	Hangzhou		China	101,800 km^{2} (39,300 sq mi)	64,567,588	25th	630/km^{2} (1,600/sq mi)	
293			Khyber Pakhtunkhwa	Peshawar		Pakistan	101,741 km^{2} (39,282 sq mi)	35,525,047	4th	349.17/km^{2} (904.3/sq mi)	
294			Béni Abbès Province	Béni Abbès		Algeria	101,350 km^{2} (39,130 sq mi)	50,163	8th	0.49/km^{2} (1.3/sq mi)	
295			Rostov	Rostov-on-Don		Russia	100,800 km^{2} (38,900 sq mi)	4,163,708	32nd	41.24/km^{2} (106.8/sq mi)	
296			Khövsgöl	Mörön		Mongolia	100,628 km^{2} (38,853 sq mi)	132,146	6th	1.3/km^{2} (3.4/sq mi)	
297			Galmudug	Dusmareb	Adado	Somalia	100,370 km^{2} (38,750 sq mi)	3,800,000	6th	38/km^{2} (98/sq mi)	
298			Lapland	Rovaniemi		Finland	100,366 km^{2} (38,752 sq mi)	177,161	1st	1.8/km^{2} (4.7/sq mi)	
299			Vichada	Puerto Carreño		Colombia	100,242 km^{2} (38,704 sq mi)	107,808	2nd	1.1/km^{2} (2.8/sq mi)	
300			Al-Jawf	Sakakah		Saudi Arabia	100,212 km^{2} (38,692 sq mi)	508,475	9th	4.39/km^{2} (11.4/sq mi)	
301			Saratov Oblast	Saratov		Russia	100,200 km^{2} (38,700 sq mi)	2,404,198	33rd	23.75/km^{2} (61.5/sq mi)	

=== 70,000–99,999 km^{2} (27,000–38,600 sq mi) ===
Rank	Subnational flag	Coat of arms/seal	Common name	Capital	Largest city	Sovereign state	Area	Population	Rank within sovereign state	Population density	Map
302			Chaco	Resistencia		Argentina	99,633 km^{2} (38,469 sq mi)	1,142,963	12th	11.47/km^{2} (29.7/sq mi)	
303			Dhofar	Salalah		Oman	99,300 km^{2} (38,300 sq mi)	408,419	1st	4.1/km^{2} (11/sq mi)	
304			Eastern	Chipata		Zambia	98,877 km^{2} (38,177 sq mi)	2,454,588	4th	25/km^{2} (65/sq mi)	
305			South West	Barawa	Baidoa	Somalia	98,863 km^{2} (38,171 sq mi)	4,387,355	7th	44/km^{2} (110/sq mi)	
306			Turkana	Lodwar		Kenya	98,597 km^{2} (38,069 sq mi)	926,976	1st	9.6/km^{2} (25/sq mi)	
307			Tete Province	Tete		Mozambique	98,417 km^{2} (37,999 sq mi)	2,648,941	3rd	27/km^{2} (70/sq mi)	
308			Tagant	Tidjikja		Mauritania	98,340 km^{2} (37,970 sq mi)	80,962	4th	0.85/km^{2} (2.2/sq mi)	
309			Norrbotten	Luleå		Sweden	98,244 km^{2} (37,932 sq mi)	251,080	1st	2.6/km^{2} (6.7/sq mi)	
310			Western	Daru		Papua New Guinea	98,189 km^{2} (37,911 sq mi)	201,351	1st	2.1/km^{2} (5.4/sq mi)	
311			Pernambuco	Recife		Brazil	98,067 km^{2} (37,864 sq mi)	9,674,793	19th	89.63/km^{2} (232.1/sq mi)	
312			North Kazakhstan	Petropavl		Kazakhstan	97,993 km^{2} (37,835 sq mi)	539,111	16th	5.5/km^{2} (14/sq mi)	
313			East Kazakhstan	Oskemen		Kazakhstan	97,700 km^{2} (37,700 sq mi)	1,369,597	17th	4.8/km^{2} (12/sq mi)	
314			Malanje Province	Malanje		Angola	97,602 km^{2} (37,684 sq mi)	986,363	4th	10/km^{2} (26/sq mi)	
315			Semnan Province	Semnan		Iran	97,491 km^{2}	715,000	7th	7.20/km^{2} (18.6/sq mi)	
316			Ahal	Arkadag		Turkmenistan	97,260 km^{2} (37,550 sq mi)	785,800	2nd	9.7/km^{2} (25/sq mi)	
317			Tillabéri Region	Tillabéri		Niger	97,251 km^{2} (37,549 sq mi)	3,839,210	5th	30/km^{2} (78/sq mi)	
318			Wadi al Shatii	Brak		Libya	97,160 km^{2} (37,510 sq mi)	78,532	5th	0.81/km^{2} (2.1/sq mi)	
319			Santa Catarina	Florianópolis	Joinville	Brazil	95,730 km^{2} (36,960 sq mi)	7,338,473	20th	81.08/km^{2} (210.0/sq mi)	
320			Kasaï	Tshikapa		Congo-Kinshasa	95,631 km^{2} (36,923 sq mi)	3,165,000	12th	33/km^{2} (85/sq mi)	
321			Kemerovo Oblast	Kemerovo		Russia	95,500 km^{2} (36,900 sq mi)	2,567,990	34th	26.83/km^{2} (69.5/sq mi)	
322			KwaZulu-Natal	Pietermaritzburg	Durban	South Africa	94,361 km^{2} (36,433 sq mi)	11,538,325	7th	122.3/km^{2} (317/sq mi)	
323			Indiana	Indianapolis		United States	94,321 km^{2} (36,418 sq mi)	6,785,528	38th	73.1/km^{2} (189/sq mi)	
324			Castile and León	Valladolid		Spain	94,222 km^{2} (36,379 sq mi)	2,447,519	1st	26/km^{2} (67/sq mi)	
325			Bihar	Patna		India	94,163 km^{2}	104,099,452	12th	1,102/km^{2} (2,850/sq mi)	
326			Neuquén Province	Neuquén		Argentina	94,078 km^{2} (36,324 sq mi)	726,590	13th	7.72/km^{2} (20.0/sq mi)	
327			State of Oaxaca	Oaxaca		Mexico	93,757 km^{2} (36,200 sq mi)	4,096,000	5th	44/km^{2} (110/sq mi)	
328			Batha	Ati		Chad	93,732 km^{2} (36,190 sq mi)	726,340	4th	0.7/km^{2} (1.8/sq mi)	
329			Sagaing	Monywa		Myanmar	93,704 km^{2} (36,179 sq mi)	5,325,347	2nd	57/km^{2} (150/sq mi)	
330			Lebap	Türkmenabat		Turkmenistan	93,700 km^{2} (36,200 sq mi)	1,160,300	3rd	14/km^{2} (36/sq mi)	
331			Altai Republic	Gorno-Altaysk		Russia	92,903 km^{2} (35,870 sq mi)	210,797	35th	2.27/km^{2} (5.9/sq mi)	
332			Boquerón	Filadelfia		Paraguay	91,669 km^{2} (35,394 sq mi)	68,080	1st	0.74/km^{2} (1.9/sq mi)	
333			Maine	Augusta	Portland	United States	91,646 km^{2} (35,385 sq mi)	1,362,359	39th	16.9/km^{2} (44/sq mi)	
334			Western Bahr el Ghazal	Wau		South Sudan	91,079 km^{2} (35,166 sq mi)	333,431	1st	3.7/km^{2} (9.6/sq mi)	
335			Tasmania	Hobart		Australia	90,758 km^{2} (35,042 sq mi)	571,165	7th	8.3/km^{2} (21/sq mi)	
336			Oriental	Oujda		Morocco	90,127 km^{2} (34,798 sq mi)	2,314,346	3rd	80/km^{2} (210/sq mi)	
337			Koulikoro Region	Koulikoro		Mali	90,120 km^{2} (34,800 sq mi)	2,418,305	4th	27/km^{2} (70/sq mi)	
338			Kwango	Kenge		Congo-Kinshasa	89,974 km^{2} (34,739 sq mi)	2,416,000	13th	22/km^{2} (57/sq mi)	
339			Riau	Pekanbaru		Indonesia	89,935 km^{2} (34,724 sq mi)	6,614,384	5th	74/km^{2} (190/sq mi)	
340			Haut-Uélé	Isiro		Congo-Kinshasa	89,683 km^{2} (34,627 sq mi)	2,046,000	14th	21/km^{2} (54/sq mi)	
341			La Rioja Province	La Rioja		Argentina	89,680 km^{2} (34,630 sq mi)	384,607	14th	4.3/km^{2} (11/sq mi)	
342			San Juan Province	San Juan		Argentina	89,651 km^{2} (34,614 sq mi)	818,234	15th	9.1/km^{2} (24/sq mi)	
343			Gao Region	Gao		Mali	89,532 km^{2} (34,568 sq mi)	544,120	5th	6.1/km^{2} (16/sq mi)	
344			Cunene	Ondjiva		Angola	89,342 km^{2} (34,495 sq mi)	990,087	5th	9.5/km^{2} (25/sq mi)	
345			Kachin	Myitkyina		Myanmar	89,041 km^{2} (34,379 sq mi)	1,689,441	3rd	19/km^{2} (49/sq mi)	
346			Caquetá	Florencia		Colombia	88,965 km^{2} (34,350 sq mi)	401,849	3rd	4.5/km^{2} (12/sq mi)	
347			Drâa-Tafilalet	Errachidia		Morocco	88,836 km^{2} (34,300 sq mi)	1,635,008	4th	18/km^{2} (47/sq mi)	
348			West Bengal	Kolkata		India	88,752 km^{2} (34,267 sq mi)	91,276,115	13th	1,029/km^{2} (2,670/sq mi)	
349			Corrientes Province	Corrientes		Argentina	88,199 km^{2} (34,054 sq mi)	1,197,553	16th	14/km^{2} (36/sq mi)	
350			In Guezzam Province	In Guezzam		Algeria	88,126 km^{2}	11,202	9th	0.13/km^{2} (0.34/sq mi)	
351			Chelyabinsk Oblast	Chelyabinsk		Russia	87,900 km^{2} (33,900 sq mi)	3,406,371	36th	38.48/km^{2} (99.7/sq mi)	
352			Muchinga	Chinsali		Zambia	87,806 km^{2} (33,902 sq mi)	922,212	5th	11/km^{2} (28/sq mi)	
353			Andalusia	Seville		Spain	87,268 km^{2}	8,464,411	2nd	96/km^{2} (250/sq mi)	
354			Mary Region	Mary		Turkmenistan	87,200 km^{2} (33,700 sq mi)	1,287,700	4th	17/km^{2} (44/sq mi)	
355			Sakhalin	Yuzhno-Sakhalinsk		Russia	87,100 km^{2} (33,600 sq mi)	459,985	37th	5.28/km^{2} (13.7/sq mi)	
356			South Sumatra	Palembang		Indonesia	86,772 km^{2}	8,657,000	6th	100/km^{2} (260/sq mi)	
357			Haute-Kotto	Bria		Central African Republic	86,650 km^{2} (33,460 sq mi)	90,316	1st	1.0/km^{2} (2.6/sq mi)	
358			Djanet Province	Djanet		Algeria	86,185 km^{2} (33,276 sq mi)	17,618	10th	0.2/km^{2} (0.52/sq mi)	
359			Southern	Choma		Zambia	85,823 km^{2} (33,136 sq mi)	2,388,093	6th	28/km^{2} (73/sq mi)	
360			Meta	Villavicencio		Colombia	85,635 km^{2}	1,052,000	4th	12.14/km^{2} (31.4/sq mi)	
361			Madre de Dios	Puerto Maldonado		Peru	85,301 km^{2}	104,000	3rd	1.1/km^{2} (2.8/sq mi)	
362			Omaheke	Gobabis		Namibia	84,981 km^{2}	71,233	5th	0.8/km^{2} (2.1/sq mi)	
363			Leningrad	Gatchina		Russia	84,500 km^{2} (32,600 sq mi)	2,027,068	38th	24.16/km^{2} (62.6/sq mi)	
364			Tver Oblast	Tver		Russia	84,100 km^{2} (32,500 sq mi)	1,210,692	39th	14.38/km^{2} (37.2/sq mi)	
365			Nouvelle-Aquitaine	Bordeaux		France	84,036 km^{2} (32,446 sq mi)	6,033,952	1st	72/km^{2} (190/sq mi)	
366			Butnan	Tobruk		Libya	83,860 km^{2} (32,380 sq mi)	195,088	6th	1.9/km^{2} (4.9/sq mi)	
367	(Note: French Guiana's official flag is the French flag. Only the French flag is officially recognized by the French constitution as the national flag, the green and yellow flag is however still used by the French Guiana national football team and still commonly flown by civilians, the green and yellow diagonal flag that is commonly used to represent French Guiana, actually has no official status. Other flags unofficially used to represent French Guiana include the Banner of Arms, which adapts the Lesser Coat of Arms of French Guiana into a flag. And the flag of the territorial collectivity used by the local government, which is a white field with green lines with the shape of French Guiana's borders, and a text which reads "Collectivité Territoriale de Guyane".)		French Guiana	Cayenne		France	83,846 km^{2} (32,373 sq mi)	301,099	2nd	3.6/km^{2} (9.3/sq mi)	
368			Arunachal Pradesh	Itanagar		India	83,743 km^{2} (32,333 sq mi)	1,383,727	14th	17/km^{2} (44/sq mi)	
369			Hokkaido	Sapporo		Japan	83,423 km^{2} (32,210 sq mi)	5,281,297	1st	63/km^{2} (160/sq mi)	
370			South Carolina	Columbia	Charleston	United States	82,932 km^{2} (32,020 sq mi)	5,282,634	40th	67.74/km^{2} (175.4/sq mi)	
371			Papua	Jayapura		Indonesia	82,681 km^{2} (31,923 sq mi)	1,035,000	7th	13/km^{2} (34/sq mi)	
372			Cabo Delgado	Pemba		Mozambique	82,625 km^{2} (31,902 sq mi)	2,320,261	4th	28/km^{2} (73/sq mi)	
373			Zavkhan	Uliastai		Mongolia	82,455 km^{2} (31,836 sq mi)	72,104	7th	0.87/km^{2} (2.3/sq mi)	
374			Al Mahrah	Al Ghaydah		Yemen	82,405 km^{2} (31,817 sq mi)	500,000	2nd	6.1/km^{2} (16/sq mi)	
375			Chongqing	Yuzhong	Wanzhou	China	82,403 km^{2} (31,816 sq mi)	32,054,159	26th	309/km^{2} (800/sq mi)	
376			Alto Paraguay	Fuerte Olimpo		Paraguay	82,349 km^{2} (31,795 sq mi)	15,008	2nd	0.18/km^{2} (0.47/sq mi)	
377			Sükhbaatar	Baruun-Urt		Mongolia	82,287 km^{2} (31,771 sq mi)	61,323	8th	0.75/km^{2} (1.9/sq mi)	
378			Ennedi-Est	Amdjarass		Chad	81,696 km^{2} (31,543 sq mi)	159,560	5th	1.95/km^{2} (5.1/sq mi)	
379			Ménaka Region	Ménaka		Mali	81,040 km^{2} (31,290 sq mi)	54,456	6th	0.67/km^{2} (1.7/sq mi)	
380			Jonglei	Bor		South Sudan	80,926 km^{2} (31,246 sq mi)	1,873,176	2nd	23.14/km^{2} (59.9/sq mi)	
381			Khentii	Öndörkhaan		Mongolia	80,325 km^{2} (31,014 sq mi)	76,019	9th	0.95/km^{2} (2.5/sq mi)	
382			Tamaulipas	Ciudad Victoria	Reynosa	Mexico	80,249 km^{2} (30,984 sq mi)	3,527,735	6th	44/km^{2} (110/sq mi)	
383			Scotland	Edinburgh	Glasgow	United Kingdom	80,231 km^{2} (30,977 sq mi)	5,436,600	2nd	70/km^{2} (180/sq mi)	
384			Jharkhand	Ranchi	Jamshedpur	India	79,716 km^{2} (30,779 sq mi)	32,988,134	15th	414/km^{2} (1,070/sq mi)	
385			Al Wusta	Haima		Oman	79,700 km^{2} (30,800 sq mi)	52,344	2nd	0.5/km^{2} (1.3/sq mi)	
386			Castilla–La Mancha	Toledo	Albacete	Spain	79,463 km^{2} (30,681 sq mi)	2,041,631	3rd	26/km^{2} (67/sq mi)	
387			Western Equatoria	Yambio		South Sudan	79,343 km^{2} (30,635 sq mi)	803,263	3rd	10/km^{2} (26/sq mi)	
388			Huíla	Lubango		Angola	79,023 km^{2} (30,511 sq mi)	2,497,422	6th	32/km^{2} (83/sq mi)	
389			Nampula Province	Nampula		Mozambique	79,010 km^{2} (30,510 sq mi)	5,758,920	5th	73/km^{2} (190/sq mi)	
390			Mopti Region	Mopti		Mali	79,017 km^{2} (30,509 sq mi)	4,037,330	7th	51/km^{2} (130/sq mi)	
391			El Bayadh Province	El Bayadh		Algeria	78,870 km^{2} (30,450 sq mi)	262,187	11th	3.3/km^{2} (8.5/sq mi)	
392			Entre Ríos	Paraná		Argentina	78,781 km^{2} (30,418 sq mi)	1,426,426	17th	18/km^{2} (47/sq mi)	
393			Jalisco	Guadalajara		Mexico	78,588 km^{2} (30,343 sq mi)	8,348,151	7th	110/km^{2} (280/sq mi)	
394			Assam	Dispur	Guwahati	India	78,438 km^{2} (30,285 sq mi)	31,169,272	16th	397/km^{2} (1,030/sq mi)	
395			Kwilu	Bandundu	Kikwit	Congo-Kinshasa	78,219 km^{2} (30,201 sq mi)	6,682,300	15th	85/km^{2} (220/sq mi)	
396			Upper Nile	Malakal		South Sudan	77,823 km^{2} (30,048 sq mi)	1,385,478	4th	18/km^{2} (47/sq mi)	
397			Sirte District	Sirte		Libya	77,660 km^{2} (29,980 sq mi)	141,378	7th	1.8/km^{2} (4.7/sq mi)	
398			Northern	Kasama		Zambia	77,650 km^{2} (29,980 sq mi)	1,623,853	7th	21/km^{2} (54/sq mi)	
399			San Luis Province	San Luis		Argentina	76,748 km^{2} (29,633 sq mi)	540,905	18th	7/km^{2}	
400			Jabal al Gharbi	Gharyan		Libya	76,717 km^{2} (29,621 sq mi)	304,159	8th	4.9/km^{2} (13/sq mi)	
401			Asir	Abha		Saudi Arabia	76,693 km^{2} (29,611 sq mi)	2,024,285	10th	?/km^{2}	
402			Nizhny Novgorod Oblast	Nizhny Novgorod		Russia	76,624 km^{2} (29,585 sq mi)	3,119,115	40th	41/km^{2} (110/sq mi)	
403			Apure	San Fernando de Apure		Venezuela	76,500 km^{2} (29,500 sq mi)	459,025	4th	7.45/km^{2} (19.3/sq mi)	
404			Mpumalanga	Mbombela		South Africa	76,495 km^{2} (29,535 sq mi)	5,142,216	8th	67/km^{2} (170/sq mi)	
405			Yazd province	Yazd		Iran	76,469 km^{2} (29,525 sq mi)	1,138,533	8th	15/km^{2} (39/sq mi)	
406			Niger	Minna		Nigeria	76,363 km^{2} (29,484 sq mi)	6,783,300	1st	52/km^{2} (130/sq mi)	
407			Khovd Province	Khovd		Mongolia	76,133 km^{2} (29,395 sq mi)	87,363	10th	1.1/km^{2} (2.8/sq mi)	
408			Gaza	Xai-Xai		Mozambique	75,709 km^{2} (29,231 sq mi)	1,422,460	6th	19/km^{2} (49/sq mi)	
409			Krasnodar Krai	Krasnodar		Russia	75,485 km^{2} (29,145 sq mi)	5,838,273	41st	77/km^{2} (200/sq mi)	
410			Zacatecas State	Zacatecas		Mexico	75,284 km^{2} (29,067 sq mi)	1,622,138	8th	22/km^{2} (57/sq mi)	
411			Al Qadarif	El-Gadarif		Sudan	75,263 km^{2} (29,059 sq mi)	2,208,385	7th	?/km^{2}	
412			Atacama	Copiapó		Chile	75,176 km^{2} (29,026 sq mi)	286,168	4th	3.8/km^{2} (9.8/sq mi)	
413			Matabeleland North	Lupane		Zimbabwe	75,025 km^{2} (28,967 sq mi)	827,645	1st	11/km^{2} (28/sq mi)	
414			Kalmykia	Elista		Russia	74,731 km^{2} (28,854 sq mi)	267,133	42nd	4/km^{2}	
415			Dundgovi	Mandalgovi		Mongolia	74,690 km^{2} (28,840 sq mi)	46,383	11th	0.62/km^{2} (1.6/sq mi)	
416			Töv	Zuunmod		Mongolia	74,042 km^{2} (28,588 sq mi)	94,462	12th	1.3/km^{2} (3.4/sq mi)	
417			Baja California Sur	La Paz		Mexico	73,909 km^{2} (28,536 sq mi)	798,447	9th	11/km^{2} (28/sq mi)	
418			Sabah	Kota Kinabalu		Malaysia	73,904 km^{2} (28,534 sq mi)	3,418,785	2nd	46/km^{2} (120/sq mi)	
419			Eastern Equatoria	Torit		South Sudan	73,472 km^{2} (28,368 sq mi)	1,393,765	5th	19/km^{2} (49/sq mi)	
420			Daşoguz Region	Daşoguz		Turkmenistan	73,430 km^{2} (28,350 sq mi)	1,550,354	5th	21/km^{2} (54/sq mi)	
421			Chiapas	Tuxtla Gutiérrez		Mexico	73,311 km^{2} (28,306 sq mi)	5,543,828	10th	76/km^{2} (200/sq mi)	
422			New Brunswick	Fredericton	Moncton	Canada	72,908 km^{2} (28,150 sq mi)	775,610	11th	10.86/km^{2} (28.1/sq mi)	
423			Presidente Hayes	Villa Hayes		Paraguay	72,907 km^{2} (28,150 sq mi)	81,876	3rd	1.1/km^{2} (2.8/sq mi)	
424			Occitania	Toulouse		France	72,724 km^{2} (28,079 sq mi)	6,022,176	3rd	83/km^{2} (210/sq mi)	
425			Ghat District	Ghat		Libya	72,700 km^{2} (28,100 sq mi)	23,518	9th	0.32/km^{2} (0.83/sq mi)	
426			Gilgit-Baltistan	Gilgit	Skardu	Pakistan	72,496 km^{2} (27,991 sq mi)	1,492,924	5th	21/km^{2} (54/sq mi)	
427			North Sumatra	Medan		Indonesia	72,461 km^{2} (27,977 sq mi)	15,386,640	8th	210/km^{2} (540/sq mi)	
428			Guainía	Inírida		Colombia	72,238 km^{2} (27,891 sq mi)	48,114	5th	0.67/km^{2} (1.7/sq mi)	
429			Tabora Region	Tabora		Tanzania	72,150 km^{2} (27,860 sq mi)	3,391,679	1st	47/km^{2} (120/sq mi)	
430			Kankan Region	Kankan		Guinea	72,145 km^{2} (27,855 sq mi)	1,972,357	1st	27/km^{2} (70/sq mi)	
431			Formosa Province	Formosa		Argentina	72,066 km^{2} (27,825 sq mi)	606,041	19th	8.4/km^{2} (22/sq mi)	
432			Afar	Semera		Ethiopia	72,053 km^{2} (27,820 sq mi)	1,152,300	4th	61/km^{2} (160/sq mi)	
433			Cusco Department	Cusco		Peru	71,986 km^{2} (27,794 sq mi)	1,205,527	4th	17/km^{2} (44/sq mi)	
434			Veracruz State	Xalapa	Veracruz	Mexico	71,826 km^{2} (27,732 sq mi)	8,062,579	11th	110/km^{2} (280/sq mi)	
435			Kurgan Oblast	Kurgan		Russia	71,488 km^{2} (27,602 sq mi)	776,661	43rd	11/km^{2} (28/sq mi)	
436			Baja California	Mexicali	Tijuana	Mexico	71,450 km^{2} (27,590 sq mi)	3,769,020	12th	53/km^{2} (140/sq mi)	
437			Borno	Maiduguri		Nigeria	70,898 km^{2} (27,374 sq mi)	6,111,500	2nd	86/km^{2} (220/sq mi)	
438			Hormozgan	Bandar Abbas		Iran	70,697 km^{2} (27,296 sq mi)	1,776,415	9th	25/km^{2} (65/sq mi)	
439			North Kalimantan	Tanjung Selor	Tarakan	Indonesia	70,657 km^{2} (27,281 sq mi)	746,201	9th	11/km^{2} (28/sq mi)	
440			Morogoro Region	Morogoro		Tanzania	70,624 km^{2} (27,268 sq mi)	3,197,104	2nd	45/km^{2} (120/sq mi)	
441			Bavaria	Munich		Germany	70,550 km^{2} (27,240 sq mi)	13,369,393	1st	189/km^{2} (490/sq mi)	
442			Kanem	Mao		Chad	70,516 km^{2} (27,226 sq mi)	505,839	6th	7.2/km^{2} (19/sq mi)	
443			Bié	Cuíto		Angola	70,314 km^{2} (27,148 sq mi)	1,455,255	7th	21/km^{2} (54/sq mi)	
444			Sikasso Region	Sikasso		Mali	70,280 km^{2} (27,140 sq mi)	2,625,919	8th	37/km^{2} (96/sq mi)	

== Summary tables ==
Area in square kilometers	Number of country subdivisions
2,000,000+	4
1,500,000–1,999,999	6
1,000,000–1,499,999	6
500,000–999,999	18
400,000–499,999	15
300,000–399,999	23
250,000–299,999	13
200,000–249,999	28
150,000–199,999	65
100,000–149,999	125
70,000–99,999	143
40,000-69,999	197
Total	646

Country	Number of country subdivisions
Russia	43
United States	40
China	26
Brazil	20
Argentina	19
Kazakhstan	17
India	16
Congo-Kinshasa	15
Mexico and Mongolia	12
Algeria and Canada	11
Saudi Arabia	10
Indonesia, Iran, Libya and South Africa	9
Mali	8
Angola, Australia, Somalia, Sudan and Zambia	7
Chad and Mozambique	6
Colombia, Namibia, Niger, Pakistan, South Sudan and Turkmenistan	5
Botswana, Chile, Bolivia, Ethiopia, Mauritania, Morocco, Peru and Venezuela	4
Egypt, France, Myanmar, Paraguay and Spain	3
Malaysia, Nigeria, Oman, Tanzania, Uzbekistan, Yemen and United Kingdom	2
Cameroon, Central African Republic, Danish Realm, Finland, Germany, Guinea, Iraq, Japan, Kenya, Papua New Guinea, Suriname, Sweden and Zimbabwe	1
Total	442

== See also ==
- List of countries and dependencies by area
- List of political and geographic subdivisions by total area
- List of first-level administrative divisions by population
- Lists of country subdivisions by GDP
  - List of the largest administrative divisions by GRDP
  - List of first-level administrative country subdivisions by nominal GDP per capita
