= List of U.S. states and territories by area =

This is a complete list of all 50 U.S. states, its federal (Washington, D.C.) and its major territories ordered by total area, land area and water area. The water area includes inland waters, coastal waters, the Great Lakes and territorial waters. Glaciers and intermittent bodies of water are counted as land area.

== Area by state, federal district or territory ==
Land, water and total area by U.S. state, district or territory; sortable
State / territory	Total area		Land area		Water area			National %
State / territory	km^{2}	mi^{2}	km^{2}	mi^{2}	km^{2}	mi^{2}	%	National %
Alaska	1,723,337	665,384	1,518,800	588,400	236,508	91,316	13.7%	17.48%
Texas	695,662	268,596	676,587	261,232	19,075	7,365	2.7%	7.06%
California	423,967	163,695	403,466	155,779	20,501	7,916	4.8%	4.30%
Montana	380,831	147,040	376,962	145,546	3,869	1,494	1.0%	3.86%
New Mexico	314,917	121,590	314,161	121,298	757	292	0.2%	3.19%
Arizona	295,234	113,990	294,207	113,594	1,026	396	0.3%	3.00%
Nevada	286,382	110,572	284,332	109,781	2,048	791	0.7%	2.91%
Colorado	269,601	104,094	268,431	103,642	1,170	452	0.4%	2.74%
Oregon	254,799	98,379	248,608	95,988	6,191	2,391	2.4%	2.58%
Wyoming	253,335	97,813	251,470	97,093	1,864	720	0.7%	2.57%
Michigan	250,487	96,714	146,435	56,539	104,052	40,175	41.5%	2.54%
Minnesota	225,163	86,936	206,232	79,627	18,930	7,309	8.4%	2.28%
Utah	219,882	84,897	212,818	82,170	7,064	2,727	3.2%	2.23%
Idaho	216,443	83,569	214,045	82,643	2,398	926	1.1%	2.20%
Kansas	213,100	82,278	211,754	81,759	1,346	520	0.6%	2.16%
Nebraska	200,330	77,348	198,974	76,824	1,356	524	0.7%	2.03%
South Dakota	199,729	77,116	196,350	75,811	3,379	1,305	1.7%	2.03%
Washington	184,661	71,298	172,119	66,456	12,542	4,842	6.8%	1.87%
North Dakota	183,108	70,698	178,711	69,001	4,397	1,698	2.4%	1.86%
Oklahoma	181,037	69,899	177,660	68,595	3,377	1,304	1.9%	1.84%
Missouri	180,540	69,707	178,040	68,742	2,501	965	1.4%	1.83%
Florida	170,312	65,758	138,887	53,625	31,424	12,133	18.5%	1.73%
Wisconsin	169,635	65,496	140,268	54,158	29,367	11,339	17.3%	1.72%
Georgia	153,910	59,425	148,959	57,513	4,951	1,912	3.2%	1.56%
Illinois	149,995	57,914	143,793	55,519	6,202	2,395	4.1%	1.52%
Iowa	145,746	56,273	144,669	55,857	1,077	416	0.7%	1.48%
New York	141,297	54,555	122,057	47,126	19,240	7,429	13.6%	1.43%
North Carolina	139,391	53,819	125,920	48,618	13,471	5,201	9.7%	1.41%
Arkansas	137,732	53,179	134,771	52,035	2,961	1,143	2.1%	1.40%
Alabama	135,767	52,420	131,171	50,645	4,597	1,775	3.4%	1.38%
Louisiana	135,659	52,378	111,898	43,204	23,761	9,174	17.5%	1.38%
Mississippi	125,438	48,432	121,531	46,923	3,907	1,509	3.1%	1.27%
Pennsylvania	119,280	46,054	115,883	44,743	3,397	1,312	2.8%	1.21%
Ohio	116,098	44,826	105,829	40,861	10,269	3,965	8.8%	1.18%
Virginia	110,787	42,775	102,279	39,490	8,508	3,285	7.7%	1.12%
Tennessee	109,153	42,144	106,798	41,235	2,355	909	2.2%	1.11%
Kentucky	104,656	40,408	102,269	39,486	2,387	921	2.3%	1.06%
Indiana	94,326	36,420	92,789	35,826	1,537	593	1.6%	0.96%
Maine	91,633	35,380	79,883	30,843	11,750	4,537	12.8%	0.93%
South Carolina	82,933	32,020	77,857	30,061	5,076	1,960	6.1%	0.84%
West Virginia	62,756	24,230	62,259	24,078	497	192	0.8%	0.64%
Maryland	32,131	12,406	25,142	9,707	6,990	2,699	21.8%	0.33%
Hawaii	28,313	10,932	16,635	6,423	11,678	4,509	41.2%	0.29%
Massachusetts	27,336	10,554	20,202	7,800	7,134	2,754	26.1%	0.28%
Vermont	24,906	9,616	23,871	9,217	1,035	400	4.2%	0.25%
New Hampshire	24,214	9,349	23,187	8,953	1,027	397	4.2%	0.25%
New Jersey	22,591	8,723	19,047	7,354	3,544	1,368	15.7%	0.23%
Connecticut	14,357	5,543	12,542	4,842	1,816	701	12.6%	0.15%
Puerto Rico	13,791	5,325	8,868	3,424	4,924	1,901	35.7%	0.14%
Delaware	6,446	2,489	5,047	1,949	1,399	540	21.7%	0.07%
Northern Mariana Islands	5,117	1,976	472	182	4,644	1,793	90.7%	0.05%
Rhode Island	4,001	1,545	2,678	1,034	1,324	511	33.1%	0.04%
U.S. Virgin Islands	1,898	733	348	134	1,550	599	81.7%	0.02%
American Samoa	1,505	581	198	76	1,307	505	86.9%	0.02%
Guam	1,478	571	543	210	935	361	63.2%	0.02%
District of Columbia	177	68	158	61	19	7	10.3%	0.00%
Minor Outlying Islands (Note: Areas were not published in the 2010 census, unlike previous years, as the U.S. Census Bureau no longer collects data on the Minor Outlying Islands.)	41	16	41	16	0	0	0.0%	0.00%
Contiguous US	8,081,869	3,120,428	7,653,006	2,954,843	428,865	165,589	5.3%	81.99%
50 States	9,833,342	3,796,676	9,147,436	3,531,846	685,907	264,834	7.0%	99.76%
50 States and DC	9,833,519	3,796,744	9,147,594	3,531,907	685,926	264,841	7.0%	99.76%
United States	9,857,306	3,805,927	9,158,022	3,535,932	699,284	269,995	7.1%	100.00%

U.S. states by total area

U.S. states by land area

U.S. states by water area

U.S. states by water percentage

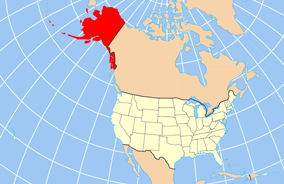
Alaska is the largest state by total area, land area, and water area. It is the seventh-largest country division in the world.

The area of Alaska is 18% of the area of the United States and equivalent to 21% of the area of the contiguous United States.

The second largest state, Texas, has 40% of the total area of the largest state, Alaska.

Rhode Island is the smallest state by total area and land area.

San Bernardino County is the largest county in the contiguous U.S. and is larger than each of the nine smallest states.

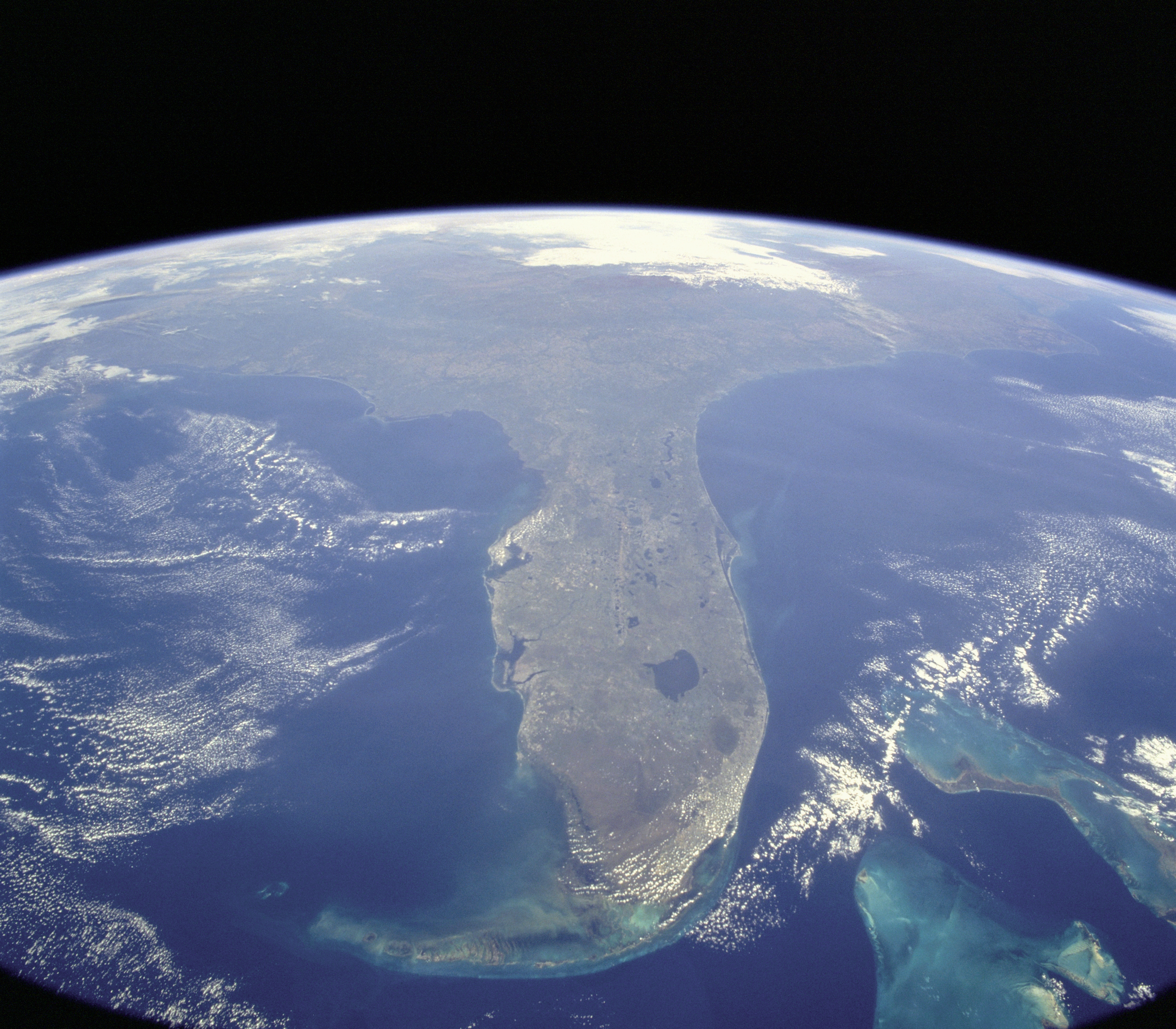
Florida is mostly a peninsula, and has the third-largest water area and seventh-largest water area percentage.

== See also ==
- List of Canadian provinces and territories by area
- List of European countries by area
- Lists of political and geographic subdivisions by total area
- List of first-level administrative divisions by area
- List of U.S. cities by area
- List of U.S. states and territories by population
