= List of first-level administrative divisions by GRDP =

Economic ranking of administrative subdivisions

The 100 largest first-level subdivisions by nominal GDP, 2024–2025

This is a list of first-level country subdivisions by nominal gross state product. This list shows the top 100 largest subdivisions by nominal GDP and PPP-adjusted GDP. Those subdivisions which are the largest in their respective countries are shown in bold.

== Top 100 subdivisions by GDP (nominal) ==
Administrative subdivision	Type	Country	Continent	Nominal GDP (billion US$)	Year	Pop. (mil)	Nominal GDP per capita (thousand US$)
**California**	State	United States	North America	4,297.45	2025	39.4	109.2
**England**	Constituent Country	United Kingdom	Europe	3,159.56	2024	58.6	53.9
Texas	State	United States	North America	2,932.34	2025	31.7	92.5
New York	State	United States	North America	2,465.75	2025	20.0	123.3
**Guangdong**	Province	China	Asia	2,041.85	2025	128.2	15.9
Jiangsu	Province	China	Asia	1,992.92	2025	85.2	23.4
Florida	State	United States	North America	1,805.62	2025	23.5	77.0
Shandong	Province	China	Asia	1,444.70	2025	100.6	14.4
Zhejiang	Province	China	Asia	1,323.60	2025	66.9	19.8
Illinois	State	United States	North America	1,240.98	2025	12.7	97.6
Pennsylvania	State	United States	North America	1,056.49	2025	13.1	80.9
Ohio	State	United States	North America	976.87	2025	11.9	82.1
**North Rhine-Westphalia**	State	Germany	Europe	947.57	2024	18.0	52.5
Sichuan	Province	China	Asia	947.30	2025	83.4	11.4
**Île-de-France**	Administrative Region	France	Europe	936.98	2024	12.5	74.7
Georgia	State	United States	North America	936.09	2025	11.3	82.8
Henan	Province	China	Asia	932.86	2025	97.7	9.5
North Carolina	State	United States	North America	895.92	2025	11.2	80.0
Washington	State	United States	North America	892.25	2025	8.0	111.5
New Jersey	State	United States	North America	887.79	2025	9.5	93.0
Hubei	Province	China	Asia	877.25	2025	58.2	15.1
**Ontario**	Province	Canada	North America	873.86	2024	16.1	54.1
Bavaria	State	Germany	Europe	863.03	2024	13.2	65.2
**Tokyo**	Prefecture	Japan	Asia	853.61	2024	14.2	59.9
Fujian	Province	China	Asia	842.78	2025	41.9	20.1
Massachusetts	State	United States	North America	813.59	2025	7.2	113.7
Virginia	State	United States	North America	807.92	2025	8.9	91.0
Shanghai	Municipality	China	Asia	793.92	2025	24.8	32.0
Hunan	Province	China	Asia	774.32	2025	65.2	11.9
Anhui	Province	China	Asia	741.84	2025	61.0	12.2
Michigan	State	United States	North America	733.89	2025	10.1	72.5
Beijing	Municipality	China	Asia	729.02	2025	21.8	33.4
Baden-Württemberg	State	Germany	Europe	709.48	2024	11.2	63.1
Hebei	Province	China	Asia	690.27	2025	73.7	9.4
**São Paulo**	State	Brazil	South America	645.59	2024	46.0	14.0
Arizona	State	United States	North America	592.10	2025	7.6	77.7
Tennessee	State	United States	North America	586.21	2025	7.3	80.1
Colorado	State	United States	North America	574.86	2025	6.0	95.6
Maryland	State	United States	North America	567.02	2025	6.3	90.5
**Lombardy**	Administrative Region	Italy	Europe	546.32	2024	10.0	54.5
Indiana	State	United States	North America	542.46	2025	7.0	77.8
**New South Wales**	State	Australia	Australia	539.76	2024-25	8.5	63.2
Minnesota	State	United States	North America	515.12	2025	5.8	88.4
Shaanxi	Province	China	Asia	511.71	2025	39.5	13.0
**Maharashtra**	State	India	Asia	504.47	2024-25	128.7	3.9
Jiangxi	Province	China	Asia	504.28	2025	44.9	11.2
Wisconsin	State	United States	North America	478.78	2025	6.0	80.2
**Gyeonggi Province**	Province	South Korea	Asia	477.27	2024	13.7	34.9
Missouri	State	United States	North America	475.38	2025	6.3	75.8
Chongqing	Municipality	China	Asia	472.61	2025	31.9	14.8
Liaoning	Province	China	Asia	464.56	2025	41.4	11.2
Yunnan	Province	China	Asia	458.72	2025	46.5	9.9
Quebec	Province	Canada	North America	450.26	2024	9.0	50.1
**Moscow**	Federal city	Russia	Europe	442.91	2024	13.0	34.0
Hong Kong	SAR	China	Asia	427.31	2025	7.5	57.0
Seoul	Special City	South Korea	Asia	421.55	2024	9.4	44.9
Guangxi	Autonomous Region	China	Asia	416.18	2025	50.1	8.3
Lower Saxony	State	Germany	Europe	415.06	2024	8.0	51.9
Hesse	State	Germany	Europe	401.41	2024	6.3	63.9
Victoria	State	Australia	Australia	400.63	2024-25	7.0	57.1
**Flanders**	Region	Belgium	Europe	397.78	2024	6.9	58.0
**Istanbul**	Province	Turkey	Europe	396.30	2024	15.7	25.2
Connecticut	State	United States	North America	382.60	2025	3.7	103.7
South Carolina	State	United States	North America	378.38	2025	5.6	67.9
Auvergne-Rhône-Alpes	Administrative Region	France	Europe	374.95	2024	8.3	45.3
Inner Mongolia	Autonomous Region	China	Asia	373.94	2025	23.8	15.7
Tamil Nadu	State	India	Asia	372.94	2024-25	77.4	4.8
Shanxi	Province	China	Asia	356.94	2025	34.4	10.4
Alberta	Province	Canada	North America	345.99	2024	4.9	70.5
Oregon	State	United States	North America	343.24	2025	4.3	80.3
Louisiana	State	United States	North America	342.32	2025	4.6	74.1
**Community of Madrid**	Autonomous Community	Spain	Europe	342.25	2024	7.1	48.1
Queensland	State	Australia	Australia	341.02	2024-25	5.6	60.7
Alabama	State	United States	North America	339.04	2025	5.2	65.3
Karnataka	State	India	Asia	332.04	2024-25	68.7	4.8
Guizhou	Province	China	Asia	329.87	2025	38.6	8.5
Gujarat	State	India	Asia	329.79	2024-25	73.5	4.5
Catalonia	Autonomous Community	Spain	Europe	327.21	2024	8.1	40.3
**Abu Dhabi**	Emirate	United Arab Emirates	Asia	326.00	2024	4.1	78.7
Utah	State	United States	North America	319.18	2025	3.5	90.2
Uttar Pradesh	State	India	Asia	319.04	2024-25	241.3	1.3
Kentucky	State	United States	North America	313.57	2025	4.6	68.1
British Columbia	Province	Canada	North America	313.25	2024	5.7	55.2
Osaka	Prefecture	Japan	Asia	306.20	2024	8.8	34.9
Aichi	Prefecture	Japan	Asia	305.91	2024	7.4	41.1
Western Australia	State	Australia	Australia	300.54	2024-25	3.0	99.9
Xinjiang	Autonomous Region	China	Asia	300.47	2025	26.3	11.4
**Eastern Province**	Province	Saudi Arabia	Asia	282.18	2024	5.6	50.2
Nevada	State	United States	North America	281.38	2025	3.3	85.7
Scotland	Constituent Country	United Kingdom	Europe	279.62	2024	5.5	50.4
Riyadh Province	Province	Saudi Arabia	Asia	275.91	2024	9.4	29.3
Oklahoma	State	United States	North America	274.29	2025	4.1	66.5
Iowa	State	United States	North America	271.94	2025	3.2	84.0
Lazio	Administrative Region	Italy	Europe	266.80	2024	5.7	46.7
**North Holland**	Province	Netherlands	Europe	263.38	2024	3.0	88.0
Tianjin	Municipality	China	Asia	259.56	2025	13.6	19.0
Kanagawa	Prefecture	Japan	Asia	257.82	2024	9.2	28.0
South Holland	Province	Netherlands	Europe	250.30	2024	3.9	64.8
**Mexico City**	State	Mexico	North America	248.69	2024	9.2	27.0
Nouvelle-Aquitaine	Administrative Region	France	Europe	241.84	2024	6.2	38.9

== Top 100 subdivisions by GDP (PPP) ==
Administrative subdivision	Type	Country	Continent	GDP (PPP) (billion US$)	Year	Pop. (mil)	GDP per capita (PPP) (thousand US$)
**Guangdong**	Province	China	Asia	4,290.62	2025	128.20	33.5
Jiangsu	Province	China	Asia	4,187.79	2025	85.22	49.1
**California**	State	United States	North America	4,103.12	2024	39.2	104.9
**England**	Constituent country	United Kingdom	Europe	3,556.69	2023	57.1	58.2
Shandong	Province	China	Asia	3,035.93	2025	100.62	30.2
Zhejiang	Province	China	Asia	2,781.39	2025	66.86	41.6
Texas	State	United States	North America	2,709.39	2024	29.1	87.0
**Maharashtra**	State	India	Asia	2,701.59	2026-27 (Note: In India, financial year starts on the 1st of April of the calendar year & ends on the 31st of March of the next calendar year. 2024-25 refers to FY2024-25 from 1 April 2024 to 31st March 2025.)	129.5	20.8
New York	State	United States	North America	2,297.03	2024	20.2	114.4
Tamil Nadu	State	India	Asia	2,031.62	2026-27	77.6	26.2
Sichuan	Province	China	Asia	1,990.63	2025	83.41	23.9
Uttar Pradesh	State	India	Asia	1,988.01	2026-27	243.47	8.2
Henan	Province	China	Asia	1,960.25	2025	97.70	20.1
Hubei	Province	China	Asia	1,843.40	2025	58.23	31.7
Fujian	Province	China	Asia	1,770.99	2025	41.92	42.3
Florida	State	United States	North America	1,705.57	2024	21.5	71.7
Shanghai	Municipality	China	Asia	1,668.30	2025	24.83	67.2
Gujarat	State	India	Asia	1,660.68	2026-27	74.34	22.3
Hunan	Province	China	Asia	1,627.11	2025	65.16	25.0
Karnataka	State	India	Asia	1,651.09	2026-27	69.07	23.9
Anhui	Province	China	Asia	1,558.87	2025	61.03	25.5
Beijing	Municipality	China	Asia	1,531.92	2025	21.82	70.2
Hebei	Province	China	Asia	1,450.49	2025	73.66	19.7
**São Paulo**	State	Brazil	South America	1,407.42	2023	44.41	43.8
**Île-de-France**	Administrative Region	France	Europe	1,358.00	2024	12.4	108.8
Illinois	State	United States	North America	1,137.24	2024	12.8	90.4
**Moscow**	Federal City	Russia	Europe	1,333.00	2024	13.0	100.8
**Punjab**	Province	Pakistan	Asia	1,272.50	2026	127.3	9.8
Shaanxi	Province	China	Asia	1,075.29	2025	39.45	27.3
Rajasthan	State	India	Asia	1074.97	2026-27	83.89	12.8
**Tokyo**	Prefecture	Japan	Asia	1,074.30	2018	13.9	77.3
West Bengal	State	India	Asia	1,073.05	2026-27	100.63	10.7
Jiangxi	Province	China	Asia	1,059.66	2025	44.88	23.6
**Seoul**	Special City (Note: Statistics are for capital area.)	South Korea	Asia	1,043.10	2017	25.5	40.6
Pennsylvania	State	United States	North America	1,024.20	2024	12.8	78.5
**North Rhine-Westphalia**	State	Germany	Europe	1,003.10	2021	17.9	56.0
Chongqing	Municipality	China	Asia	993.11	2025	31.89	31.1
Andhra Pradesh	State	India	Asia	986.54	2026-27	53.7	18.3
Telangana	State	India	Asia	979.87	2026-27	38.66	25.3
Liaoning	Province	China	Asia	976.20	2025	41.43	23.6
Yunnan	Province	China	Asia	963.93	2025	46.50	20.7
Ohio	State	United States	North America	927.74	2024	11.6	75.9
Madhya Pradesh	State	India	Asia	923.21	2026-27	89.96	10.3
Georgia	State	United States	North America	882.54	2024	10.3	74.8
Guangxi	Autonomous Region	China	Asia	874.54	2025	50.06	17.5
Washington	State	United States	North America	854.68	2024	7.3	105.8
New Jersey	State	United States	North America	846.59	2024	8.9	88.6
**Lombardy**	Administrative Region	Italy	Europe	844.26	2023	10.35	81.57
North Carolina	State	United States	North America	839.12	2024	10.1	72.4
Bavaria	State	Germany	Europe	820.30	2016	12.8	60.6
Kerala	State	India	Asia	813.72	2025-26	36.24	22.4
Inner Mongolia	Autonomous Region	China	Asia	785.78	2025	23.81	33.0
Massachusetts	State	United States	North America	780.67	2024	6.8	108.2
**Jakarta**	Special Region	Indonesia	Asia	774.94	2024	10.7	72.5
**Ontario**	Province	Canada	North America	735.8	2018	14.1	50.0
Virginia	State	United States	North America	764.48	2024	8.4	83.7
Haryana	State	India	Asia	758.45	2026-27	31.42	24.1
Shanxi	Province	China	Asia	750.05	2025	34.35	21.8
Delhi	Union Territory	India	Asia	662.86	2026-27	22.67	29.2
Baden-Württemberg	State	Germany	Europe	688.3	2016	10.9	59.4
**Istanbul**	Province	Turkey	Europe	682.7	2017	15.1	45.7
Michigan	State	United States	North America	706.62	2024	10.0	67.6
Guizhou	Province	China	Asia	693.17	2025	38.59	18.0
East Java	Province	Indonesia	Asia	667.30	2024	41.5	16.0
Bihar	State	India	Asia	654.34	2026-27	132.85	4.9
Xinjiang	Autonomous Region	China	Asia	631.38	2025	26.31	24.0
Hong Kong	SAR	China	Asia	603.29	2025	7.5	78.1
West Java	Province	Indonesia	Asia	594.65	2024	49.9	11.8
**Bangkok**	Special Administrative Area	Thailand	Asia	577.61	2023	9.1	63.6
Odisha	State	India	Asia	552.94	2026-27	47.21	11.7
**Mexico City**	Autonomous City	Mexico	North America	550.5	2018	9.0	61.2
Colorado	State	United States	North America	553.32	2024	5.5	91.2
Arizona	State	United States	North America	552.17	2024	6.9	70.6
Tennessee	State	United States	North America	549.71	2024	6.7	75.0
Maryland	State	United States	North America	542.77	2024	6.0	69.0
Indiana	State	United States	North America	527.38	2024	6.6	74.2
Minnesota	State	United States	North America	500.85	2024	5.6	83.8
**New South Wales**	State	Australia	Australia	551.86	2023-24 (Note: In Australia, financial year starts on the 1st of July of the calendar year & ends on the 30th of June of the next calendar year. Therefore 2023-24 refers to FY2023-24 from 1 July 2023 to 30 June 2024.)	8.0	59.2
Tianjin	Municipality	China	Asia	545.42	2025	13.64	40.0
Heilongjiang	Province	China	Asia	496.53	2025	30.15	16.5
**Community of Madrid**	Autonomous Community	Spain	Europe	495.03	2023	6.5	71.29
Punjab	State	India	Asia	489.82	2026-27	31.37	15.6
Rio de Janeiro	State	Brazil	South America	479.19	2023	16.56	25.3
Catalonia	Autonomous Community	Spain	Europe	476.10	2023	7.5	59.68 5.8
Wisconsin	State	United States	North America	451.29	2024	5.8	71.9
Missouri	State	United States	North America	451.20	2024	6.2	70.1
Jilin	Province	China	Asia	440.51	2025	23.07	19.1
Assam	State	India	Asia	435.29	2026-27	36.49	11.8
**Emirate of Abu Dhabi**	Emirate	United Arab Emirates	Asia	431.45	2023	3.27	131.76
**Metro Manila**	CapitalRegion	Philippines	Asia	424.39	2024	13.8	30.8
Tyumen Oblast	Federal subject	Russia	Europe	416.6	2021	3.8	109.8
Victoria	State	Australia	Australia	406.52	2023-24	6.2	58.3
Gansu	Province	China	Asia	402.96	2025	24.51	16.4
Minas Gerais	State	Brazil	South America	397.11	2023	20.54	26.2
Hesse	State	Germany	Europe	393.8	2015	6.2	58.2
Lower Saxony	State	Germany	Europe	386.5	2015	7.8	54.8
Central Java	Province	Indonesia	Asia	382.86	2024	37.5	10.1
Osaka	Prefecture	Japan	Asia	368.1	2014	8.8	41.8
Connecticut	State	United States	North America	365.72	2024	3.6	96.9
Chhattisgarh	State	India	Asia	354.52	2026-27	31.31	11.3

== See also ==
- List of first-level administrative divisions by GDP per capita
- List of metropolitan areas by GDP
