= List of first-level administrative divisions by population =

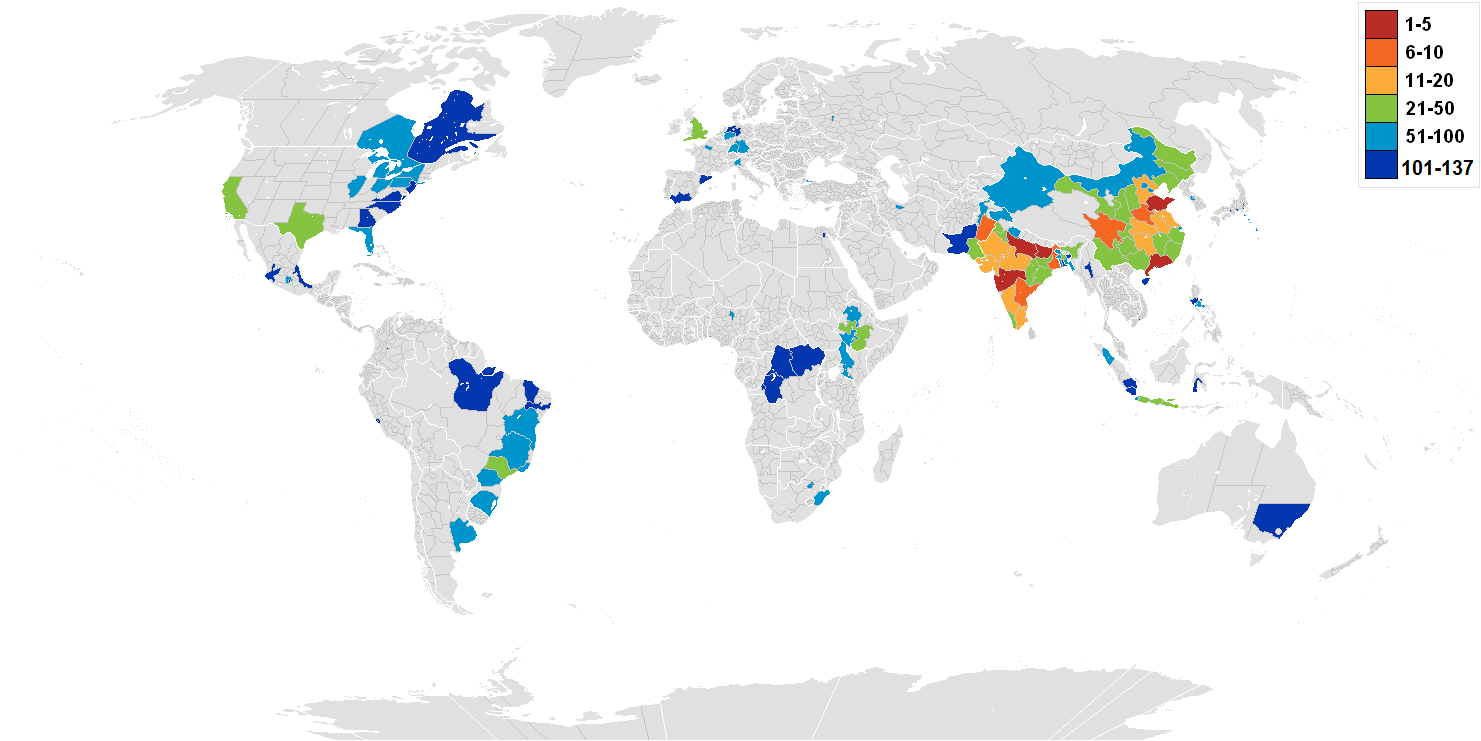
The 137 most populous country subdivisions in 2012

The following list sorts first-level administrative divisions of countries according to their number of inhabitants. Only administrative units of the highest order are listed. Regions formed for statistical purposes without administrative autonomy, such as the Kantō region in Japan or the eight federal districts of Russia, are not included. Cities, on the other hand, can be counted if they form a first-level administrative unit, such as Shanghai or the capital region of Delhi, which are equivalent to a Chinese province or an Indian state or union territory. Administrative units such as Los Angeles County, which has more than ten million inhabitants, are not included in the list as they are already counted as part of the first-level administrative division of California.

== List ==
All first-level administrative units with more than 5 million inhabitants at the last ascertainable date. Also indicated are the administrative center (capital city), the type of administrative unit, the country to which the administrative unit belongs, the land area and the population density per square kilometer of land area.

Name	Capital	Type	Country	Inhabitants	Total Area km^{2}	People per km^{2}	Year
Uttar Pradesh	Lucknow	State	India	241,066,874	240,928	1,001	2023
Bihar	Patna	State	India	130,725,310	94,163	1,269	2023
Maharashtra	Mumbai	State	India	128,659,000	307,713	393	2023
Punjab	Lahore	Province	Pakistan	127,688,922	205,345	621	2023
Guangdong	Guangzhou	Province	China	126,570,000	179,700	704	2022
Shandong	Jinan	Province	China	101,630,000	157,100	646	2022
West Bengal	Kolkata	State	India	99,723,000	88,752	1,101	2023
Henan	Zhengzhou	Province	China	98,720,000	167,000	591	2022
Madhya Pradesh	Bhopal	State	India	87,610,000	308,252	267	2023
Jiangsu	Nanjing	Province	China	85,150,000	102,600	829	2022
Sichuan	Chengdu	Province	China	83,740,000	486,100	172	2022
Rajasthan	Jaipur	State	India	81,897,000	342,239	229	2023
Tamil Nadu	Chennai	State	India	76,481,545	130,060	588	2023
Hebei	Shijiazhuang	Province	China	74,200,000	188,800	393	2022
Gujarat	Gandhinagar	State	India	72,367,000	196,244	326	2023
Karnataka	Bengaluru	State	India	66,165,886	191,791	345	2023
Hunan	Changsha	Province	China	66,040,000	211,800	311	2022
Zhejiang	Hangzhou	Province	China	65,770,000	101,800	646	2022
Anhui	Hefei	Province	China	61,270,000	139,400	439	2022
Hubei	Wuhan	Province	China	58,440,000	185,900	314	2022
England	London	Constituent country	United Kingdom	57,106,398	132,932	429	2022
Sindh	Karachi	Province	Pakistan	55,696,147	140,914	395	2023
Andhra Pradesh	Amaravati	State	India	53,340,000	160,205	330	2023
Guangxi	Nanning	Autonomous regions	China	50,470,000	237,600	212	2022
West Java	Bandung	Province	Indonesia	50,345,200	37,045	1,359	2024
Yunnan	Kunming	Province	China	46,930,000	394,100	116	2022
São Paulo	São Paulo	State	Brazil	46,004,000	248,219	185	2023
Odisha	Bhubaneswar	State	India	45,429,399	155,707	270	2023
Jiangxi	Nanchang	Province	China	45,280,000	166,900	271	2022
Dhaka	Dhaka	Division	Bangladesh	44,215,107	20,551	1,955	2022
Liaoning	Shenyang	Province	China	41,970,000	148,400	282	2022
Fujian	Fuzhou	Province	China	41,880,000	123,900	338	2022
East Java	Surabaya	Province	Indonesia	41,814,500	48,037	870	2024
Oromia	Addis Ababa	Region	Ethiopia	40,884,000	284,538	143	2024
Khyber Pakhtunkhwa	Peshawar	Province	Pakistan	40,856,097	101,741	349	2023
Shaanxi	Xi'an	Province	China	39,560,000	205,800	192	2022
California	Sacramento	State	United States	39,431,263	423,967	93	2024
Guizhou	Guiyang	Province	China	38,560,000	176,200	218	2022
Telangana	Hyderabad	State	India	38,472,769	114,840	335	2023
Central Java	Semarang	Province	Indonesia	37,892,300	34,337	1,104	2024
Jharkhand	Ranchi	State	India	37,329,128	79,716	468	2023
Kerala	Thiruvananthapuram	State	India	35,330,888	38,852	909	2023
Shanxi	Taiyuan	Province	China	34,810,000	156,700	222	2022
Assam	Dispur	State	India	34,586,234	78,438	441	2023
Chittagong	Chittagong	Division	Bangladesh	33,202,326	33,771	979	2022
Amhara	Bahir Dar	Region	Ethiopia	32,456,300	154,709	209	2024
Chongqing	-	Province-level city	China	32,130,000	82,400	389	2022
Texas	Austin	State	United States	31,290,831	695,662	45	2024
Heilongjiang	Harbin	Province	China	30,990,000	454,800	68	2022
Punjab	Chandigarh	State	India	31,188,000	50,362	588	2023
Chhattisgarh	Raipur	State	India	30,524,000	135,192	211	2023
Haryana	Chandigarh	State	India	30,936,000	44,212	619	2023
Xinjiang	Ürümqi	Autonomous regions	China	25,870,000	1,664,900	15	2022
Gansu	Lanzhou	Province	China	24,920,000	425,800	58	2022
Shanghai	-	Province-level city	China	24,750,000	6,340	3,903	2020
Inner Mongolia	Hohhot	Autonomous regions	China	24,010,000	1,183,000	20	2022
Jilin	Changchun	Province	China	23,480,000	187,400	125	2022
Florida	Tallahassee	State	United States	23,372,215	170,312	137	2024
Beijing	-	Province-level city	China	21,840,000	16,411	1,330	2022
Minas Gerais	Belo Horizonte	State	Brazil	21,322,691	586,528	36	2024
Rajshahi	Rajshahi	Division	Bangladesh	20,353,119	18,197	1,121	2022
New York	Albany	State	United States	19,867,248	141,297	140	2022
Delhi	New Delhi	Union territory	India	18,345,784	1,483	12,371	2023
North Rhine-Westphalia	Düsseldorf	State	Germany	18,190,422	34,112	533	2023
Netherlands	Amsterdam	Constituent country	Kingdom of the Netherlands	18,077,662	41,873	431	2025
México	Toluca de Lerdo	State	Mexico	17,764,322	22,351	794	2025
Rangpur	Rangpur	Division	Bangladesh	17,610,956	16,317	1,088	2022
Buenos Aires	La Plata	Province	Argentina	17,569,053	307,571	57	2022
Khulna	Khulna	Division	Bangladesh	17,416,645	22,272	782	2022
Rio de Janeiro	Rio de Janeiro	State	Brazil	17,219,679	43,696	394	2024
Calabarzon	Calamba	Region	Philippines	16,933,234	16,873	1,003	2024
Ontario	Toronto	Province	Canada	16,182,641	1,076,395	15	2025
Istanbul	-	Metropolitan municipality	Turkey	15,907,951	5,196	3,062	2022
North Sumatra	Medan	Province	Indonesia	15,588,500	72,461	215	2024
Kano	Kano	State	Nigeria	15,462,200	20,131	768	2022
Gauteng	Johannesburg	Province	South Africa	15,099,422	18,178	830	2022
Balochistan	Quetta	Province	Pakistan	14,894,402	347,190	43	2023
Kinshasa	-	Province	DR Congo	14,565,700	9,965	1,462	2020
Tehran	Tehran	Province	Iran	14,437,000	13,692	1,054	2023
Tokyo	Shinjuku	Prefectures-level Metropolis	Japan	14,254,039	2,194	6,496	2025
Bahia	Salvador da Bahia	State	Brazil	14,141,626	565,733	25	2022
Ho Chi Minh City	-	Province-level municipality	Vietnam	14,002,598	6,772	2,067	2025
Metro Manila	-	Region	Philippines	14,001,751	636	22,015	2024
Tianjin	-	Province-level city	China	13,630,000	11,917	975	2022
Gyeonggi-do	Suwon	Province	South Korea	13,511,676	10,170	1,329	2020
Lagos	Ikeja	State	Nigeria	13,491,800	3,345	4,033	2022
Bavaria	Munich	State	Germany	13,435,062	70,541	190	2023
Moscow	-	Federal city	Russia	13,258,262	2,561	5,177	2025
Pennsylvania	Harrisburg	State	United States	13,078,751	119,280	109	2024
Central Luzon	San Fernando	Region	Philippines	12,989,074	22,014	590	2024
Illinois	Springfield	State	United States	12,710,158	149,995	84	2024
Banten	Serang	Province	Indonesia	12,431,400	9,353	1,329	2024
KwaZulu-Natal	Pietermaritzburg	Province	South Africa	12,423,907	94,361	131	2022
Île-de-France	Paris	Region	France	12,262,544	12,011	1,020	2022
Jammu and Kashmir	Srinagar/Jammu	Union territory	India	12,258,433	42,241	290	2011
Mymensingh	Mymensingh	Division	Bangladesh	12,225,498	10,569	1,146	2022
Ohio	Columbus	State	United States	11,883,304	116,098	102	2024
Paraná	Curitiba	State	Brazil	11,623,091	199,298	58	2021
Baden-Württemberg	Stuttgart	State	Germany	11,339,260	35,748	317	2023
Georgia	Atlanta	State	United States	11,180,878	153,910	72	2024
Lima	Lima	Province	Peru	11,170,333	2,672	4,180	2023
Uttarakhand	Dehradun	State	India	11,913,000	53,483	207	2023
North Carolina	Raleigh	State	United States	11,046,024	139,391	79	2024
Sylhet	Sylhet	Division	Bangladesh	11,034,863	12,596	873	2022
Rio Grande do Sul	Porto Alegre	State	Brazil	10,882,965	281,707	38	2023
Jakarta	-	Special Region	Indonesia	10,684,900	661	16,165	2024
Central Ethiopia Regional State	Hosaena	Region	Ethiopia	10,561,000	15,098	699	2024
Katsina	Katsina	State	Nigeria	10,368,500	24,192	429	2022
Hainan	Haikou	Province	China	10,270,000	35,354	290	2022
Cairo	Cairo	Governorate	Egypt	10,423,163	3,085	3,378	2025
Michigan	Lansing	State	United States	10,140,459	250,487	40	2024
Lombardy	Milan	Region	Italy	10,035,481	23,864	420	2025
Baghdad	Baghdad	Governorate	Iraq	9,780,429	5,200	1,881	2024
Giza	Giza	Governorate	Egypt	9,741,416	13,184	738	2025
Seoul	–	Special city	South Korea	9,586,195	604	15,839	2020
Pernambuco	Recife	State	Brazil	9,539,029	98,067	97	2024
New Jersey	Trenton	State	United States	9,500,851	22,591	420	2024
South Sulawesi	Makassar	Province	Indonesia	9,463,400	45,331	209	2024
Lampung	Bandar Lampung	Province	Indonesia	9,419,600	33,570	281	2024
Mexico City	–	Distrito Federal	Mexico	9,365,788	1,495	6,264	2025
Kanagawa	Yokohama	Prefecture	Japan	9,225,000	2,416	3,818	2024
Québec	Québec City	Province	Canada	9,111,629	1,542,056	6	2025
Barisal	Barisal	Division	Bangladesh	9,100,102	13,297	688	2022
Luanda	Luanda	Province	Angola	9,079,800	18,835	482	2022
Kaduna	Kaduna	State	Nigeria	9,032,200	46,053	196	2022
South Sumatra	Palembang	Province	Indonesia	8,837,300	86,772	102	2024
Virginia	Richmond	State	United States	8,811,195	110,787	79	2024
Hanoi	-	Province-level municipality	Vietnam	8,807,523	3,359	2,622	2025
Ceará	Fortaleza	State	Brazil	8,794,957	146,348	60	2023
Moscow Oblast	Moscow	Oblast	Russia	8,766,594	44,329	197	2025
Osaka	Osaka	Prefecture	Japan	8,757,000	1,905	4,596	2024
Jalisco	Guadalajara	State	Mexico	8,751,003	78,588	111	2025
Pará	Belém	State	Brazil	8,639,532	1,247,689	7	2023
Andalusia	Seville	Autonomous community	Spain	8,631,862	87,598	98	2024
Riyadh	Riyadh	Province	Saudi Arabia	8,591,748	404,240	21	2022
New South Wales	Sydney	State	Australia	8,511,151	801,150	10	2021
Bauchi	Bauchi	State	Nigeria	8,308,800	45,837	181	2022
Lower Saxony	Hanover	State	Germany	8,161,981	47,710	171	2023
North Kivu	Goma	Province	DR Congo	8,147,400	59,483	137	2020
Veracruz	Xalapa	State	Mexico	8,126,081	71,826	113	2025
Sharqia	Zagazig	Governorate	Egypt	8,103,307	4,911	1,650	2025
Auvergne-Rhône-Alpes	Lyon	Region	France	8,042,936	69,711	115	2022
Catalonia	Barcelona	Autonomous community	Spain	8,012,231	32,113	249	2024
Khartoum	Khartoum	State	Sudan	7,993,900	22,142	361	2018
Oyo	Ibadan	State	Nigeria	7,976,100	28,454	280	2022
Washington	Olympia	State	United States	7,958,180	184,661	43	2024
Bogotá	-	Distrito Capital	Colombia	7,937,898	1,636	5,091	2025
Algiers Province	Algiers	Province	Algeria	7,796,923	1,190	6,600	2023
Mecca	Mecca	Province	Saudi Arabia	7,769,994	153,128	50	2022
South Ethiopia Regional State	Wolaita Sodo	Region	Ethiopia	7,584,741	45,209	167	2024
Hong Kong	–	Special administrative region	China	7,534,200	1,105	6,818	2024
Jigawa	Dutse	State	Nigeria	7,499,100	23,154	323	2022
Rivers	Port Harcourt	State	Nigeria	7,476,800	11,077	675	2022
Aichi	Nagoya	Prefecture	Japan	7,460,000	5,173	1,442	2024
Casablanca-Settat	Casablanca	Region	Morocco	7,688,967	20,166	381	2024
Arizona	Phoenix	State	United States	7,582,384	295,234	25	2024
Western Cape	Cape Town	Province	South Africa	7,433,020	129,462	57	2022
Metropolitana de Santiago	Santiago de Chile	Region	Chile	7,400,741	15,403	480	2024
Yangon	Yangon	Region	Myanmar	7,370,010	10,277	717	2024
Selangor	Shah Alam	State	Malaysia	7,363,400	8,104	908	2024
Goiás	Goiânia	State	Brazil	7,350,480	340,086	21	2024
Saitama	Saitama	Prefecture	Japan	7,332,000	3,797	1,930	2024
Himachal Pradesh	Shimla	State	India	7,316,708	55,673	131	2023
Ningxia	Yinchuan	Province	China	7,280,000	66,400	109	2022
Eastern Cape	Bhisho	Province	South Africa	7,230,204	168,966	42	2022
Tennessee	Nashville	State	United States	7,227,750	109,153	66	2024
Santa Catarina	Florianópolis	State	Brazil	7,218,704	95,730	75	2021
Dakahlia	Mansoura	Governorate	Egypt	7,190,280	3,538	2,032	2025
Razavi Khorasan	Mashhad	Province	Iran	7,167,000	118,851	60	2023
Massachusetts	Boston	State	United States	7,136,171	27,336	261	2024
Beheira	Damanhur	Governorate	Egypt	7,069,800	9,826	719	2025
South Kivu	Bukavu	Province	DR Congo	7,066,400	64,791	109	2020
Taiwan	Taipei	Country	Republic of China	7,060,473	25,110	280	2020
Victoria	Melbourne	State	Australia	7,012,962	227,444	30	2024
Madrid	Madrid	Autonomous community	Spain	7,009,268	8,028	873	2024
Antioquia	Medellín	Department	Colombia	6,951,825	63,612	104	2025
Indiana	Indianapolis	State	United States	6,924,275	94,326	73	2024
Kongo Central	Matadi	Province	DR Congo	6,838,500	53,920	109	2020
Tigray	Mekelle	Region	Ethiopia	6,838,000	50,079	136	2024
Flanders	Brussels	Autonome Region	Belgium	6,821,770	13,626	500	2024
Niger	Minna	State	Nigeria	6,783,300	76,363	88	2022
Maranhão	São Luís	State	Brazil	6,776,699	331,983	20	2023
Riau	Pekanbaru	Province	Indonesia	6,728,100	89,936	76	2024
Kwilu	Bandundu	Province	DR Congo	6,682,300	78,533	85	2020
Somali Region	Jijiga	Region	Ethiopia	6,657,000	279,525	23	2024
Nampula	Nampula	Province	Mozambique	6,649,900	81,606	81	2023
Central Visayas	Cebu City	Region	Philippines	6,640,875	10,114	656	2024
Puebla	Puebla	State	Mexico	6,592,099	34,306	192	2025
Limpopo	Polokwane	Province	South Africa	6,572,721	125,754	52	2022
Minya	al-Minya	Governorate	Egypt	6,552,484	32,279	202	2025
Shan State	Taunggyi	State	Myanmar	6,517,377	155,801	41	2024
Hesse	Wiesbaden	State	Germany	6,420,729	21,116	304	2023
Sokoto	Sokoto	State	Nigeria	6,391,000	25,973	246	2022
Ogun	Abeokuta	State	Nigeria	6,379,500	16,762	381	2022
Abidjan	Abidjan	District	Côte d'Ivoire	6,321,017	2,140	2,945	2021
Guanajuato	Guanajuato	State	Mexico	6,313,694	30,608	206	2025
Mandalay	Mandalay	Region	Myanmar	6,283,663	30,888	203	2024
Qalyubiyya	Banha	Governorate	Egypt	6,272,887	1,124	5,580	2025
Maryland	Annapolis	State	United States	6,263,220	32,131	194	2024
Chiba	Chiba	Prefecture	Japan	6,251,000	5,157	1,212	2024
Missouri	Jefferson City	State	United States	6,245,466	180,540	34	2024
Nuevo León	Monterrey	State	Mexico	6,161,091	64,156	96	2025
Benue	Makurdi	State	Nigeria	6,141,300	34,059	180	2022
Bagmati	Kathmandu	Province	Nepal	6,116,866	20,300	301	2021
Madhesh	Janakpur	Province	Nepal	6,114,600	9,661	633	2021
Western Province	Colombo	Province	Sri Lanka	6,113,698	3,684	1,659	2024
Borno	Maiduguri	State	Nigeria	6,111,500	70,898	86	2022
Bicol	Legazpi City	Region	Philippines	6,064,426	18,155	334	2024
Sagaing	Sagaing	Region	Myanmar	6,015,590	93,702	64	2024
Nouvelle-Aquitaine	Bordeaux	Region	France	6,010,289	84,036	71	2022
Hauts-de-France	Lille	Region	France	6,004,947	31,806	188	2022
Zambézia	Quelimane	Province	Mozambique	6,003,900	105,008	57	2023
Denmark	Copenhagen	Constituent country	Danish Realm	6,001,008	43,094	139	2025
Kabul	Kabul	Province	Afghanistan	5,966,395	4,524	1,319	2024
Wisconsin	Madison	State	United States	5,960,975	169,635	35	2024
Colorado	Denver	State	United States	5,957,493	269,601	22	2024
Addis Ababa	—	Chartered city	Ethiopia	5,956,680	527	11,302	2025
Anambra	Awka	State	Nigeria	5,953,500	4,844	1,229	2022
Qinghai	Xining	Province	China	5,950,000	722,300	8	2022
Sohag	Sohag	Governorate	Egypt	5,947,983	11,022	539	2025
Occitania	Toulouse	Region	France	5,933,185	72,724	81	2022
Chiapas	Tuxtla Gutiérrez	State	Mexico	5,923,036	73,311	80	2025
Krasnodar Krai	Krasnodar	Krai	Russia	5,841,846	75,485	77	2025
West Sumatra	Padang	Province	Indonesia	5,836,200	42,120	139	2024
Zamfara	Gusau	State	Nigeria	5,833,500	39,762	147	2022
Minnesota	Saint Paul	State	United States	5,793,151	225,163	25	2024
Ankara	Ankara	Metropolitan municipality	Turkey	5,782,285	24,521	236	2022
British Columbia	Victoria	Province	Canada	5,722,318	944,735	6	2025
Haut-Katanga	Lubumbashi	Province	DR Congo	5,718,800	132,425	43	2020
Lazio	Rome	Region	Italy	5,710,272	17,242	331	2025
West Kalimantan	Pontianak	Province	Indonesia	5,695,500	147,307	39	2024
Bangsamoro	Parang, Maguindanao del Norte	Autonomous region	Philippines	5,691,583	11,936	477	2024
East Nusa Tenggara	Kupang	Province	Indonesia	5,656,000	46,447	122	2024
West Nusa Tenggara	Mataram	Province	Indonesia	5,646,000	19,676	287	2024
Delta	Asaba	State	Nigeria	5,636,100	17,698	319	2022
Alexandria	Alexandria	Governorate	Egypt	5,633,287	2,300	2,449	2025
Saint Petersburg	–	Federal city	Russia	5,645,943	1,403	4,024	2025
Queensland	Brisbane	State	Australia	5,608,666	1,723,030	3	2024
Campania	Naples	Region	Italy	5,575,025	13,671	407	2025
Kebbi	Birnin Kebbi	State	Nigeria	5,563,900	36,800	151	2022
Grand Est	Strasbourg	Region	France	5,556,219	57,441	96	2022
Aceh	Banda Aceh	Province	Indonesia	5,554,800	56,835	98	2024
Ayeyarwady	Pathein	Region	Myanmar	5,546,281	35,032	158	2024
Gharbia	Tanta	Governorate	Egypt	5,545,813	1,942	2,855	2025
Mazovia	Warsaw	Voivodeship	Poland	5,510,527	35,560	155	2024
Isfahan	Isfahan	Province	Iran	5,480,000	107,018	51	2023
South Carolina	Columbia	State	United States	5,478,831	82,933	66	2024
Imo	Owerri	State	Nigeria	5,459,300	5,530	987	2022
Bangkok	-	Province	Thailand	5,456,000	1,564	3,488	2024
Greater Accra Region	Accra	Region	Ghana	5,455,692	3,245	1,681	2021
Ashanti	Kumasi	Region	Ghana	5,440,463	24,389	223	2021
Scotland	Edinburgh	Constituent country	United Kingdom	5,439,842	80,231	67	2022
Davao	Davao City	Region	Philippines	5,389,422	20,357	264	2024
Dar es Salaam	Dar es Salaam	Region	Tanzania	5,383,728	1,393	3,865	2022
Ilocos	San Fernando	Region	Philippines	5,342,453	13,012	410	2024
Hyōgo	Kōbe	Prefecture	Japan	5,337,000	8,401	635	2024
Valencia	Valencia	Autonomous community	Spain	5,319,285	23,255	228	2024
Ondo	Akure	State	Nigeria	5,316,600	14,606	364	2022
Sidama Region	Hawassa	Region	Ethiopia	5,301,868	12,000	441	2024
Asyut	Asyut	Governorate	Egypt	5,251,664	25,926	202	2025
Northern Mindanao	Cagayan de Oro	Region	Philippines	5,178,326	20,496	252	2024
Fars	Schiras	Province	Iran	5,171,000	122,608	42	2023
Alabama	Montgomery	State	United States	5,157,699	135,767	38	2024
Mpumalanga	Mbombela	Province	South Africa	5,143,324	76,495	67	2022
Rabat-Salé-Kénitra	Rabat	Region	Morocco	5,132,639	18,194	282	2024
Eastern Province	Dammam	Province	Saudi Arabia	5,125,254	672,522	7	2022
Lumbini	Deukhuri	Province	Nepal	5,122,078	19,707	260	2021
Alberta	Edmonton	Province	Canada	5,101,500	634,658	9	2026
Gezira	Wad Madani	State	Sudan	5,096,900	23,373	218	2018
Fukuoka	Fukuoka	Prefecture	Japan	5,092,000	4,986	1,021	2024
Provence-Alpes-Côte d'Azur	Marseille	Region	France	5,081,101	31,400	161	2022
Chuzestan	Ahvaz	Province	Iran	5,074,000	64,055	79	2023
Hokkaidō	Sapporo	Prefecture	Japan	5,043,000	83,424	60	2024
