= List of first-level administrative divisions by GDP per capita =

This is a list of country subdivisions by gross domestic product (nominal and PPP) per capita in the world, ordered by GDP per capita. Entries are limited to those entities exceeding 50,000 U.S. dollars. Those subdivisions which are the largest (in GDP per capita terms) in their respective countries are shown in bold. Figures are shown in U.S. dollars.

== List of first-level administrative country subdivisions by nominal GDP per capita ==
Country	Country subdivision	US$	Year
United States	**District of Columbia**	257 442	2023
Switzerland	**Basel-Stadt**	221 890	2021
Switzerland	Zug	188 984	2021
Ireland	**Dublin**	165 335	2022
Switzerland	Geneva	121 616	2021
Norway	**Oslo**	120 226	2021
Australia	**Western Australia**	110 650	2022
United States	New York	109 971	2023
Switzerland	Neuchâtel	109 567	2021
Switzerland	Schaffhausen	107 989	2021
Switzerland	Zürich	106 840	2022
United States	Massachusetts	104 816	2023
Switzerland	Ticino	103 290	2021
United States	Washington	102 589	2023
United States	California	99 118	2023
Germany	**Hamburg**	98 327	2024
Canada	**Northwest Territories**	95 839	2022
Denmark	**Hovedstaden**	95 042	2022
United States	North Dakota	94 540	2023
United States	Connecticut	94 046	2023
United States	Alaska	91 815	2023
Netherlands	Utrecht	91 341	2023
United States	Delaware	90 703	2023
Australia	Northern Territory	90 355	2022
Canada	Nunavut	90 201	2022
United States	Nebraska	90 185	2023
Switzerland	Bern	88 952	2021
Switzerland	St. Gallen	88 904	2021
United States	Colorado	88 538	2023
United States	Illinois	86 294	2023
United States	New Jersey	86 032	2023
United States	Wyoming	85 902	2022
United Arab Emirates	**Emirate of Abu Dhabi**	84 900	2022
Switzerland	Grisons	84 326	2021
Switzerland	Vaud	84 263	2021
United States	Texas	84 040	2023
United States	Maryland	82 890	2023
Netherlands	North Holland	82 753	2023
United States	Minnesota	82 228	2023
Belgium	**Brussels**	81 901	2022
Switzerland	Basel-Landschaft	81 239	2021
United States	Virginia	81 128	2023
United States	Utah	79 756	2023
Switzerland	Glarus	79 496	2021
Switzerland	Jura	79 316	2021
United States	New Hampshire	79 243	2023
Switzerland	Nidwalden	78 934	2021
United States	South Dakota	78 777	2023
Switzerland	Lucerne	78 690	2021
Canada	Alberta	78 227	2022
United Kingdom	**London**	78 155	2022
Australia	Australian Capital Territory	77 736	2022
Switzerland	Obwalden	77 723	2021
United States	Iowa	77 618	2023
Switzerland	Appenzell Innerrhoden	77 509	2021
Norway	Rogaland	77 169	2021
United States	Kansas	76 861	2023
Switzerland	Solothurn	76 391	2021
Sweden	**Stockholm**	76 057	2022
United States	Hawaii	75 270	2023
United States	Nevada	74 948	2023
United States	Oregon	74 754	2023
Canada	Saskatchewan	74 594	2022
United States	Pennsylvania	74 455	2023
Switzerland	Thurgovia	74 202	2021
United States	Ohio	74 050	2023
United States	Tennessee	73 422	2023
Japan	**Tokyo**	73 071	2020
United States	Georgia	73 024	2023
China	**Macau**	72 907	2024
Switzerland	Schwyz	72 570	2021
United States	Indiana	72 431	2023
Czech Republic	**Prague**	71 657	2023
Switzerland	Appenzell Ausserrhoden	70 862	2021
United States	North Carolina	70 778	2023
Switzerland	Argovia	70 478	2021
United States	Wisconsin	70 034	2022
United States	Florida	69 856	2023
Austria	Vienna	69 057	2023
Canada	Yukon	68 772	2022
United States	Arizona	68 405	2023
Finland	**Helsinki-Uusimaa**	68 294	2022
United States	Missouri	68 156	2023
Switzerland	Fribourg	68 063	2021
United States	Louisiana	67 691	2023
Norway	Vestland	67 500	2021
France	**Île-de-France**	66 686	2022
United States	Vermont	66 613	2023
Australia	New South Wales	66 020	2022
Netherlands	South Holland	65 923	2023
United States	Michigan	65 655	2023
Australia	Queensland	65 617	2022
Sweden	Norrbotten	65 490	2022
Norway	Trøndelag	65 445	2021
United States	Maine	65 257	2023
Norway	Møre og Romsdal	63 652	2021
Norway	Troms og Finnmark	64 544	2021
Norway	Nordland	63 573	2021
Germany	Berlin	63 370	2023
Switzerland	Valais	63 091	2021
United States	Oklahoma	62 690	2023
Switzerland	Uri	62 473	2021
Austria	**Salzburg**	62 790	2022
United States	Montana	62 287	2023
Austria	Vorarlberg	62 194	2022
United States	New Mexico	61 579	2023
United States	Kentucky	61 365	2023
United States	Idaho	60 462	2023
South Korea	**Ulsan**	60 135	2022
Germany	Bremen	60 054	2022
United States	South Carolina	59 971	2023
Australia	Victoria	59 510	2022
Denmark	Central Denmark	59 335	2022
Canada	Newfoundland and Labrador	58 854	2022
United States	Alabama	58 756	2023
Norway	Agder	58 845	2021
Netherlands	North Brabant	57 834	2022
Netherlands	Groningen	57 819	2022
Norway	Viken	57 943	2021
United Arab Emirates	Emirate of Dubai	57 534	2023
Italy	**South Tyrol**	57 465	2022
United States	Arkansas	57 450	2023
Norway	Vestfold og Telemark	57 211	2021
Sweden	Kronoberg	57 060	2022
Germany	Bavaria	56 916	2022
Norway	Innlandet	56 900	2021
Denmark	Southern Denmark	56 842	2022
Canada	British Columbia	56 690	2022
Sweden	Västra Götaland	56 602	2022
United States	West Virginia	56 218	2023
Sweden	Västerbotten	55 897	2022
New Zealand	**Auckland Region**	55 724	2022
New Zealand	Wellington	55 352	2022
Australia	South Australia	54 097	2022
Germany	Hesse	54 081	2022
China	Hong Kong	54 034	2024
Austria	Upper Austria	54 025	2022
Germany	Baden-Württemberg	53 993	2022
Austria	Tyrol	53 947	2022
Sweden	Uppsala	53 297	2022
Canada	Ontario	53 178	2022
Finland	Åland	52 556	2022
Finland	Ostrobothnia	52 317	2021
Sweden	Östergötland	51 823	2022
Denmark	North Jutland	51 268	2022
New Zealand	Southland	51 163	2022
New Zealand	Taranaki	51 007	2022
Chile	**Antofagasta**	50 962	2022
Netherlands	Limburg	50 720	2022
Finland	Kymenlaakso	50 628	2021

== List of first-level administrative country subdivisions by PPP GDP per capita ==
Country	Country subdivision	US$ PPP	Year
Singapore	**Central Region**	262 385	2023
United States	**District of Columbia**	257 442	2023
Switzerland	**Basel-Stadt**	193 769	2021
Ireland	**Dublin**	184 977	2022
Switzerland	Zug	165 034	2021
China	**Macau**	128 026	2024
United Arab Emirates	**Emirate of Abu Dhabi**	123 066	2023
Czech Republic	**Prague**	118 973	2022
Australia	**Western Australia**	116 259	2022
Norway	**Oslo**	115 235	2021
Egypt	**South Sinai Governorate**	114 190	2021
Russia	**Tyumen Oblast**	112 953	2022
Belgium	**Brussels**	111 965	2022
Singapore	West Region	111 652	2023
Germany	**Hamburg**	111 318	2022
United States	New York	109 971	2023
Denmark	**Hovedstaden**	109 291	2022
Canada	**Northwest Territories**	107 117	2022
Malaysia	**Kuala Lumpur**	106 542	2025
Switzerland	Geneva	106 203	2021
United States	Massachusetts	104 816	2023
Chile	**Antofagasta**	104 450	2022
Russia	Sakhalin Oblast	102,590	2022
United States	Washington	102 589	2023
Canada	Nunavut	100 815	2022
United States	California	99 118	2023
United Kingdom	**London**	97 361	2022
South Korea	**Ulsan**	95 827	2022
Switzerland	Neuchâtel	95 681	2021
Switzerland	Schaffhausen	94 303	2021
Poland	Warsaw	94 080	2022
Netherlands	**North Holland**	95 689	2022
Australia	Northern Territory	94 935	2022
United States	North Dakota	94 540	2023
United States	Connecticut	94 046	2023
France	**Île-de-France**	93 936	2022
Switzerland	Zürich	93 300	2022
Malaysia	Putrajaya	92 911	2025
Sweden	**Stockholm**	91 983	2022
United States	Alaska	91 815	2023
Hungary	Budapest	91 410	2022
Italy	**South Tyrol**	91 612	2022
United States	Delaware	90 703	2023
Switzerland	Ticino	90 200	2021
United States	Nebraska	90 185	2023
Singapore	North-East Region	89 507	2023
United States	Colorado	88 538	2023
Netherlands	Utrecht	88 516	2022
Canada	Alberta	87 433	2022
United States	Illinois	86 294	2023
United States	New Jersey	86 032	2023
Slovakia	**Bratislava**	85 937	2022
United States	Wyoming	85 902	2022
Austria	**Salzburg**	84 582	2022
United States	Texas	84 040	2023
Austria	Vorarlberg	83 780	2022
United Arab Emirates	Emirate of Dubai	83 592	2023
Canada	Saskatchewan	83 373	2022
United States	Maryland	82 890	2023
United States	Minnesota	82 228	2023
Germany	Bremen	82 117	2022
Australia	Australian Capital Territory	81 676	2022
Austria	Vienna	81 341	2022
United States	Virginia	81 128	2023
Singapore	East Region	80 553	2023
Finland	**Helsinki-Uusimaa**	79 765	2022
United States	Utah	79 756	2023
United States	New Hampshire	79 243	2023
Sweden	Norrbotten	79 203	2022
United States	South Dakota	78 777	2023
Germany	Bavaria	77 826	2022
Switzerland	Bern	77 679	2021
Switzerland	St. Gallen	77 637	2021
United States	Iowa	77 618	2023
Japan	**Tokyo**	77 447	2020
Canada	Yukon	76 866	2022
United States	Kansas	76 861	2023
Netherlands	North Brabant	75 598	2022
Netherlands	Groningen	75 579	2022
United States	Hawaii	75 270	2023
China	Hong Kong	75 115	2024
United States	Nevada	74 948	2023
United States	Oregon	74 754	2023
Slovenia	**Central Slovenia**	74 583	2022
United States	Pennsylvania	74 455	2023
South Korea	South Chungcheong	74 677	2022
Italy	Trentino	74 350	2022
Italy	Lombardy	74 164	2022
United States	Ohio	74 050	2023
Norway	Rogaland	73 965	2021
Germany	Hesse	73 949	2022
Germany	Baden-Württemberg	73 829	2022
Switzerland	Grisons	73 639	2021
Switzerland	Vaud	73 585	2021
Italy	Aosta Valley	73 609	2022
Austria	Tyrol	73 513	2022
United States	Tennessee	73 422	2023
United States	Georgia	73 024	2023
Netherlands	South Holland	73 007	2022
Austria	Upper Austria	72 775	2022
Russia	Magadan Oblast	72 615	2022
Indonesia	**Jakarta**	72 527	2024
United States	Indiana	72 431	2023
Singapore	North Region	72 007	2023
Switzerland	Basel-Landschaft	70 943	2021
United States	North Carolina	70 778	2023
Belgium	Flemish Region	70 497	2022
United States	Wisconsin	70 034	2022
United States	Florida	69 856	2023
Germany	Berlin	69 854	2022
Switzerland	Glarus	69 422	2021
Australia	New South Wales	69 367	2022
Switzerland	Jura	69 264	2021
Sweden	Kronoberg	69 009	2022
Australia	Queensland	68 944	2022
Switzerland	Nidwalden	68 931	2021
Switzerland	Lucerne	68 717	2021
Sweden	Västra Götaland	68 454	2022
United States	Arizona	68 405	2023
Denmark	Central Denmark	68 231	2022
United States	Missouri	68 156	2023
Lithuania	**Vilnius County**	68 049	2021
Switzerland	Obwalden	67 873	2021
United States	Louisiana	67 691	2023
Switzerland	Appenzell Innerrhoden	67 686	2021
Russia	Moscow	67 797	2022
Sweden	Västerbotten	67 601	2022
Italy	Emilia-Romagna	66 996	2022
Switzerland	Solothurn	66 710	2021
Netherlands	Limburg	66 299	2022
United States	Vermont	66 613	2023
Spain	**Community of Madrid**	66 292	2022
Canada	Newfoundland and Labrador	65 779	2022
United States	Michigan	65 655	2023
Denmark	Southern Denmark	65 364	2022
United States	Maine	65 257	2023
Switzerland	Thurgovia	64 798	2021
Norway	Vestland	64 698	2021
China	Beijing	64 618	2024
Sweden	Uppsala	64 457	2022
Austria	Styria	63 999	2022
Germany	North Rhine-Westphalia	63 720	2022
Switzerland	Schwyz	63 374	2021
South Korea	Seoul	63 571	2022
Canada	British Columbia	63 361	2022
Netherlands	Zeeland	63 132	2022
Russia	Yakutia	63 040	2022
Norway	Trøndelag	62 728	2021
United States	Oklahoma	62 690	2023
Austria	Carinthia	62 680	2022
Sweden	Östergötland	62 675	2022
Italy	Lazio	62 514	2022
Turkey	**Istanbul**	62 428	2022
Spain	Basque Country	62 411	2022
Italy	Veneto	62 384	2022
United States	Montana	62 287	2023
Malaysia	Labuan	65 267	2025
Netherlands	Overijssel	62 126	2022
Netherlands	Gelderland	61 892	2022
Russia	Saint Petersburg	61 888	2022
Switzerland	Appenzell Ausserrhoden	61 881	2021
Norway	Troms og Finnmark	61 865	2021
South Korea	South Jeolla	61 737	2022
Switzerland	Argovia	61 546	2021
United States	New Mexico	61 579	2023
South Korea	North Chungcheong	61 441	2022
China	Shanghai	61 493	2024
United States	Kentucky	61 365	2023
Norway	Møre og Romsdal	61 010	2021
Norway	Nordland	60 934	2021
Italy	Friuli-Venezia Giulia	60 505	2022
New Zealand	**Auckland Region**	60 476	2022
United States	Idaho	60 462	2023
Germany	Lower Saxony	60 379	2022
Austria	Lower Austria	60 267	2022
Latvia	Riga Region	60 116	2021
United Arab Emirates	Emirate of Sharjah	60 114	2023
New Zealand	Wellington	60 071	2022
United States	South Carolina	59 971	2023
Italy	Liguria	59 937	2022
Germany	Rhineland-Palatinate	59 779	2022
Sweden	Jönköping	59 737	2022
France	Provence-Alpes-Côte d'Azur	59 470	2022
Malaysia	Penang	59 541	2025
Australia	Victoria	59 510	2022
Switzerland	Fribourg	59 437	2021
Sweden	Värmland	59 308	2022
Denmark	North Jutland	58 955	2022
Italy	Tuscany	58 812	2022
United States	Alabama	58 756	2023
Spain	Navarre	58 645	2022
Sweden	Skåne	58 323	2022
Portugal	**Lisbon Region**	57 873	2022
Sweden	Jämtland	57 787	2022
Italy	Piedmont	57 586	2022
United States	Arkansas	57 450	2023
United Arab Emirates	Emirate of Ras Al Khaimah	57 405	2023
Sweden	Örebro	57 323	2023
Sweden	Dalarna	57 129	2022
Finland	Åland	56 764	2022
Spain	Catalonia	56 584	2022
Finland	Ostrobothnia	56 506	2021
Germany	Saarland	56 480	2022
Norway	Agder	56 402	2021
New Zealand	Taranaki	55 356	2022
United States	West Virginia	56 218	2023
Norway	Viken	55 538	2021
New Zealand	Southland	55 525	2022
Germany	Schleswig-Holstein	55 289	2022
France	Auvergne-Rhône-Alpes	55 278	2022
Switzerland	Valais	55 095	2021
Norway	Vestfold og Telemark	54 836	2021
South Korea	North Gyeongsang	54 729	2022
Finland	Kymenlaakso	54 682	2021
Switzerland	Uri	54 555	2021
Norway	Innlandet	54 538	2021
Spain	Aragon	54 343	2022
Netherlands	Flevoland	54 165	2022
Australia	South Australia	54 097	2022
Thailand	**Bangkok**	54 092	2021
Canada	Quebec	54 025	2022
Finland	Pirkanmaa	53 990	2021
Russia	Murmansk Oblast	53 894	2022
Egypt	**Port Said Governorate**	53 686	2021
Mexico	**Campeche**	53 636	2022
Finland	South Karelia	53 498	2021
Netherlands	Friesland	53 422	2022
Canada	Ontario	53 178	2022
Finland	Southwest Finland	52 980	2021
Sweden	Halland	52 842	2022
United Kingdom	Scotland	52 666	2022
Canada	Manitoba	52 572	2022
Malaysia	Sarawak	54 233	2025
Japan	Aichi	52 194	2020
Germany	Saxony	51 958	2022
Sweden	Blekinge	51 885	2022
Malaysia	Selangor	51 736	2025
Australia	Tasmania	51 723	2022
Spain	La Rioja	51 446	2022
New Zealand	Southland	51 163	2022
Finland	Lapland	51 121	2021
New Zealand	Taranaki	51 007	2022
Netherlands	Drenthe	50 760	2022
Greece	**Attica**	50 171	2022
Austria	Burgenland	50 106	2022
Germany	Brandenburg	50 102	2022
Turkey	Ankara	50 086	2022
