= List of Mexican states by population growth rate =

The following table shows the 32 federal entities of Mexico, ranked in order by population growth from the 2020 to the 2010 National Census Population from the National Institute of Statistics and Geography.

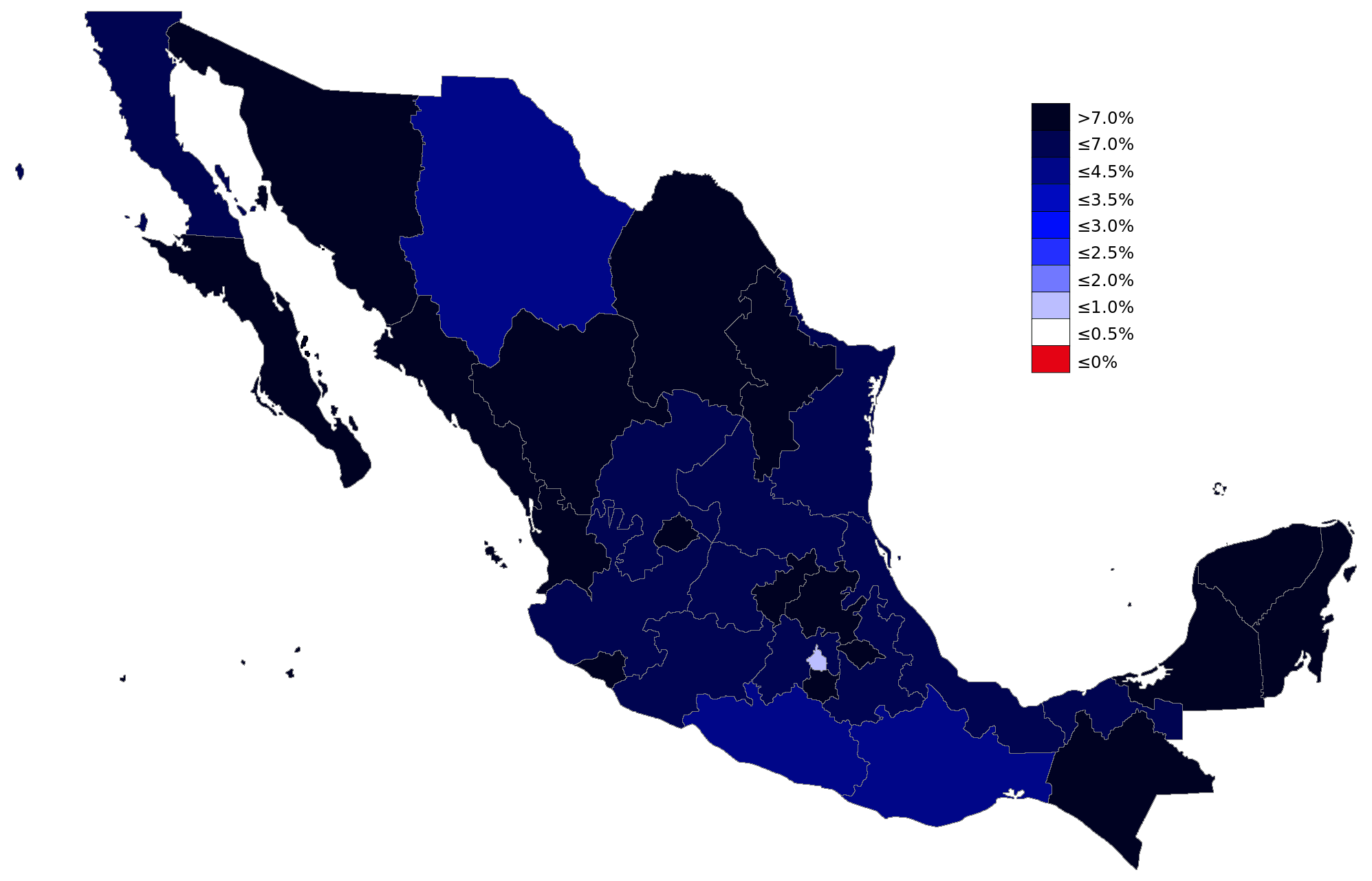
Map of population change in Mexico states between 2010 and 2015.

Rank	State	2020 Census	2010 Census	Change	Numeric Change
1	Quintana Roo	1,857,985	1,325,578	+40.16%	532,407
2	Querétaro	2,368,467	1,827,937	+29.57%	540,530
3	Baja California Sur	798,447	637,026	+25.34%	161,421
4	Nuevo León	5,784,442	4,653,458	+24.30%	1,130,984
5	Aguascalientes	1,425,607	1,184,996	+20.30%	240,611
6	Baja California	3,769,020	3,155,070	+19.46%	613,950
7	Yucatán	2,320,898	1,955,577	+18.68%	365,321
8	Hidalgo	3,082,841	2,665,018	+15.68%	417,823
9	Chiapas	5,543,828	4,796,580	+15.58%	747,248
10	Tlaxcala	1,342,977	1,169,936	+14.79%	173,041
11	Coahuila	3,146,771	2,748,391	+14.50%	398,380
12	Puebla	6,583,278	5,779,829	+13.90%	803,449
13	Nayarit	1,235,456	1,084,979	+13.87%	150,477
14	Jalisco	8,348,151	7,350,682	+13.57%	997,469
15	Campeche	928,363	822,441	+12.88%	105,922
16	Colima	731,391	650,555	+12.43%	80,836
17	Guanajuato	6,166,934	5,486,372	+12.40%	680,562
18	Durango	1,832,650	1,632,934	+12.23%	199,716
—	Mexico	126,014,024	112,336,538	+12.18%	13,677,486
19	México	16,992,418	15,175,862	+11.97%	1,816,556
20	Morelos	1,971,520	1,777,227	+10.93%	194,293
21	Sonora	2,944,840	2,662,480	+10.61%	282,360
22	Chihuahua	3,741,869	3,406,465	+9.85%	335,404
23	Sinaloa	3,026,943	2,767,761	+9.36%	259,182
24	San Luis Potosí	2,822,255	2,585,518	+9.16%	236,737
25	Michoacán	4,748,846	4,351,037	+9.14%	397,809
26	Zacatecas	1,622,138	1,490,668	+8.82%	131,470
27	Oaxaca	4,132,148	3,801,962	+8.68%	330,186
28	Tamaulipas	3,527,735	3,268,554	+7.93%	259,181
29	Tabasco	2,402,598	2,238,603	+7.33%	163,995
30	Veracruz	8,062,579	7,643,194	+5.49%	419,385
31	Guerrero	3,540,685	3,388,768	+4.48%	151,917
32	Ciudad de México	9,209,944	8,851,080	+4.05%	358,864

== See also ==
- Mexico
- States of Mexico
- Geography of Mexico
- List of Mexican states by population
- List of Mexican states by area
- Ranked list of Mexican states
- List of Mexican states by HDI
- List of Mexican states by GDP
- List of Mexican states by GDP per capita
