= List of Mexican states by fertility rate =

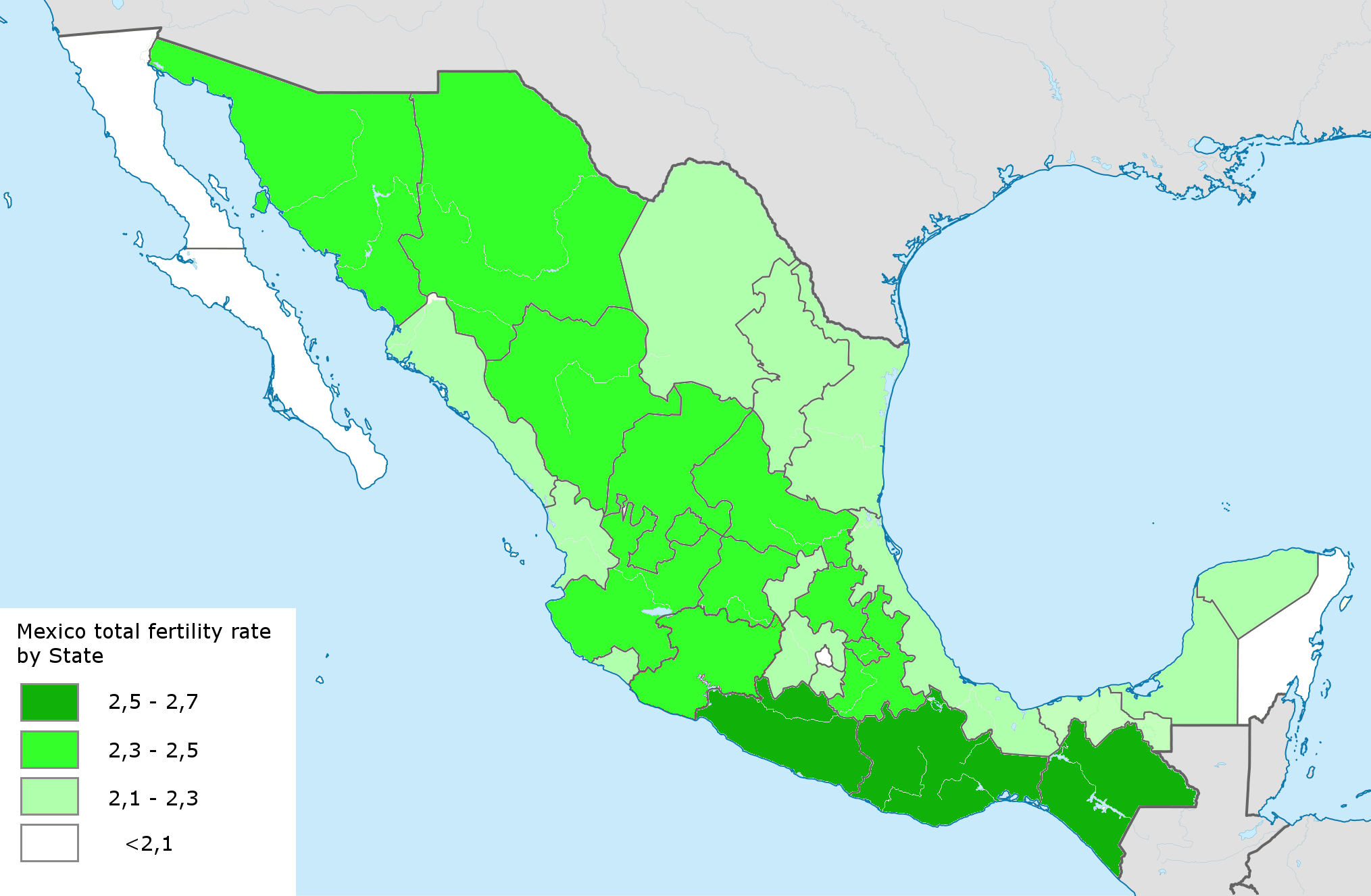
Total fertility rate by state in 2014.

This is a list ranking the 32 federal states in Mexico by fertility rate in 2013 and 2016.

Rank	State	Fertility Rate (2013)	Fertility Rate (2016)
1	Chiapas	2.59	2.47
2	Oaxaca	2.57	2.44
1	Guerrero	2.54	2.37
2	Zacatecas	2.47	2.36
2	Puebla	2.46	2.34
2	Aguascalientes	2.43	2.30
2	San Luis Potosí	2.40	2.29
3	Durango	2.38	2.26
3	Michoacán de Ocampo	2.36	2.21
3	Sonora	2.35	2.23
3	Chihuahua	2.35	2.22
3	Tlaxcala	2.34	2.20
3	Guanajuato	2.33	2.18
3	Jalisco	2.31	2.17
3	Hidalgo	2.30	2.16
-	Mexico	2.27	2.14
4	Nayarit	2.29	2.14
4	Tamaulipas	2.29	2.09
4	Tabasco	2.28	2.07
4	Coahuila de Zaragoza	2.28	2.05
4	Sinaloa	2.27	2.04
4	Colima	2.24	2.01
4	Yucatán	2.23	1.98
4	Morelos	2.22	1.93
4	México	2.20	1.85
4	Querétaro de Arteaga	2.20	1.90
5	Nuevo León	2.18	1.88
5	Campeche	2.17	1.89
5	Veracruz de Ignacio de la Llave	2.14	1.92
6	Baja California Sur	2.07	1.80
6	Quintana Roo	2.05	1.86
6	Baja California	2.01	1.84
7	Ciudad de México	1.69	1.52

== See also ==
- Mexico
- States of Mexico
- Geography of Mexico
- List of Mexican states by area
- List of Mexican states by population
- List of Mexican states by population growth rate
- Ranked list of Mexican states
- Demographics of Mexico
