= Índice Metropolitano de la Calidad del Aire =

The Índice Metropolitano de la Calidad del Aire or IMECA, in English meaning the Metropolitan Index of Air Quality, is the reference value system for the levels of air pollution in the Mexico City Metropolitan Area, within the Valley of Mexico.

It is a real-time monitoring of the concentrations of several pollutants in the atmosphere of the Mexico City Metropolitan Area. It was established for the inhabitants of Mexico City and the Greater Mexico City area to know the real-time levels of air pollution in their urban environment.

== Calculation process ==
The IMECA is calculated using the measurements of the quality of the air by SIMAT (Sistema de Monitoreo Atmosférico de la Ciudad de México). The IMECA is used to show the level of pollution and the level of risk that represents to the human health in the greater Mexico City and also the time of the measurements or the actions recommended for protection. The IMECA is calculated using the measurements of average times of the chemicals ozone (O_{3}), sulphur dioxide (SO_{2}), nitrogen dioxide (NO_{2}), carbon monoxide (CO), and particles lower than 10 micrometers (PM_{10}).

The IMECA is published each hour for the population of the Mexico City Metropolitan Area, which includes the municipalities of Mexico City and of the State of México.

== Categories ==
To report the quality of the air, the IMECA uses 5 index categories:

- Buena (good) — when the index is between 0 and 50 imecas. The quality of air is considered satisfactory and the air pollution poses minimal or no health risks.
- Regular (regular) — when the index is between 51 and 100 imecas. The quality of air is acceptable, however some contaminants could have moderate health effects for a small fraction of the population that has high sensitivity to some contaminants.
- Mala (bad) — when the index is between 101 and 150. In this value, some sensitive groups can have health effects. Some people can experience minor symptoms, including people with breathing or heart problems, children and old people. At this stage, there is no significant risk for the general public.
- Muy mala (very bad) — when the index is between 151 and 200. In this situation everybody can experience negative health effects. Members of sensitive groups can present serious issues. This interval activates the phases precontingencia (precontingency) and contingencia fase I (1st contingency phase) of the Programa de Contingencias Ambientales Atmosféricas(PCAA) del Valle de México (Atmospheric Environmental Contingencies Program of Mexico City).
- Extremadamente mala (extremely bad) — when the index is more than 201. In this condition the general population may experience very serious symptoms and health effects.

== See also ==
- Air pollution in Mexico City
- Greater Mexico City topics
