= List of Mexican states by GDP per capita =

The following is the list of Mexico's 32 federal states ranked by their GDP (PPP) per capita as of 2018, according to OECD Statistics.

PPP GDP per capita of Mexican states, US$, 2020

Mexican States by GDP (PPP) per capita - 2018
Rank	State	PPP per capita (MXN)	PPP per capita (USD)
1	Campeche	613,639	67,233
2	Mexico City	437,405	47,924
3	Nuevo León	338,655	37,105
4	Baja California Sur	295,875	32,418
5	Coahuila	289,002	31,665
6	Querétaro	266,775	29,229
7	Sonora	260,071	28,495
8	Aguascalientes	247,577	27,126
9	Quintana Roo	219,011	23,996
10	Baja California	216,675	23,740
11	Tabasco	212,886	23,325
12	Chihuahua	207,980	22,787
13	Jalisco	203,407	22,286
14	Colima	193,594	21,211
15	San Luis Potosí	188,815	20,688
16	Tamaulipas	188,482	20,651
17	Guanajuato	173,992	19,063
18	Sinaloa	169,522	18,574
19	Yucatán	157,425	17,248
20	Durango	150,109	16,447
21	Zacatecas	132,803	14,551
22	Hidalgo	132,627	14,531
23	Morelos	132,335	14,499
24	Veracruz	129,599	14,200
25	Nayarit	126,830	13,896
26	Puebla	126,778	13,890
27	Michoacán	126,310	13,839
28	State of Mexico	117,794	12,906
29	Tlaxcala	100,882	11,053
30	Oaxaca	91,232	9,996
31	Guerrero	89,533	9,810
32	Chiapas	66,216	7,255
-	Mexico	188,327	20,634

== See also ==
- List of Mexican states by GDP
- List of Mexican states by Human Development Index

General:

- States of Mexico
- Ranked list of Mexican states
