= List of Mexican states by GDP =

List of Mexican states and cities by GDP

The following list shows the GDP (nominal) of Mexico's 32 states as of 2022, ranked in order. Overall, in the calendar year 2022, the Nominal GDP of Mexico at Current Prices totaled at US$1.42 trillion, as compared to US$1.27 trillion in 2021.

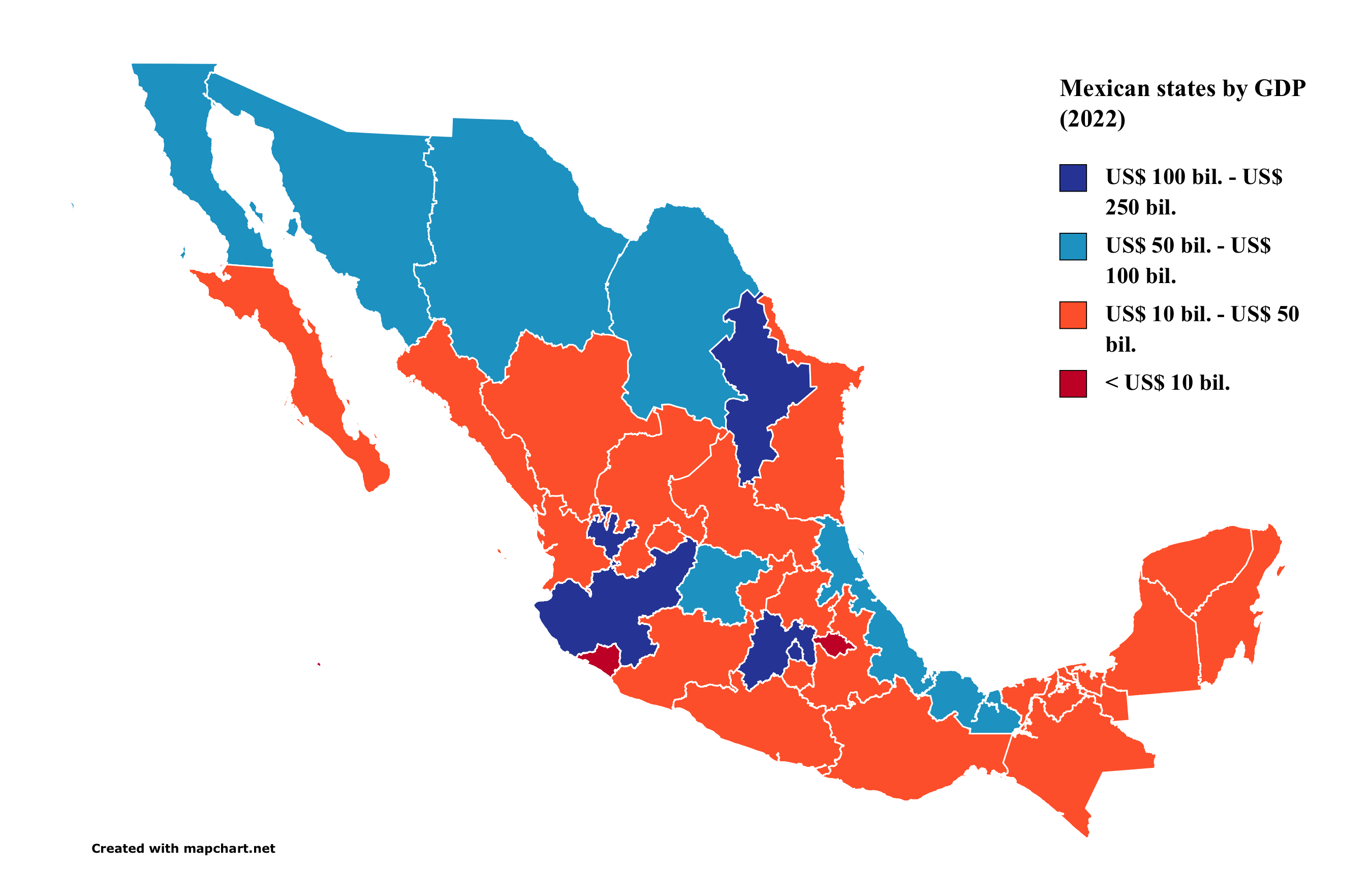
Mexican states by GDP (2022)

Federal entities by GDP 2024 (millions)
Position	State	Nominal GDP (MXN)	Nominal GDP (USD)	GDP PPP (Int$)	Growth	Nominal GDP per capita	% of national
1	Mexico City	5,041,647	248,690	508,000	▲1.88%	$27,023	14%
2	State of Mexico	3,092,683	168,909	311,621	▲2.13%	$9,528	9.12%
3	Nuevo León	2,725,351	148,847	274,608	▲3.81%	$24,279	8.04%
4	Jalisco	2,506,618	136,900	252,569	▲0.19%	$15,677	7.39%
5	Guanajuato	1,530,094	83,567	154,173	▲3.68%	$13,236	4.51%
6	Veracruz	1,467,074	80,125	147,824	▼3.14%	$9,900	4.33%
7	Baja California	1,326,625	72,454	133,672	▲1.20%	$19,173	3.91%
8	Chihuahua	1,306,656	71,364	131,660	▲3.76%	$17,503	3.71%
9	Coahuila	1,234,107	67,401	124,350	▼0.26%	$19,494	3.85%
10	Puebla	1,196,445	65,345	120,555	▲3.77%	$9,921	3.53%
11	Sonora	1,130,306	61,732	113,891	▲0.91%	$19,790	3.33%
12	Tamaulipas	1,012,031	55,273	101,973	▲2.34%	$15,458	2.98%
13	Michoacán	923,380	50,431	93,040	▲0.01%	$10,201	2.72%
14	Querétaro	820,631	44,819	82,687	▲2.21%	$17,711	2.41%
15	San Luis Potosí	788,628	43,071	79,463	▲0.42%	$14,987	2.33%
16	Tabasco	747,531	40,827	75,322	▼7.09%	$16,086	2.2%
17	Sinaloa	719,586	39,301	72,506	▼0.82%	$12,399	2.12%
18	Oaxaca	640,484	34,980	64,536	▼5.29%	$8,245	1.89%
19	Campeche	582,833	31,832	58,727	▼7.04%	$33,545	1.72%
20	Hidalgo	582,833	31,832	58,727	▲2.01%	$9,876	1.72%
21	Yucatán	548,362	29,949	55,253	▲3.20%	$12,608	1.62%
22	Chiapas	534,942	29,216	53,901	▲2.46%	$4,939	1.58%
23	Quintana Roo	515,104	28,133	51,902	▼3.97%	$14,673	1.52%
24	Durango	443,938	24,246	44,732	▲5.23%	$13,132	1.34%
25	Guerrero	443,938	24,246	44,732	▼3.21%	$6,729	1.31%
26	Aguascalientes	443,911	24,244	44,729	▼0.07%	$16,234	1.31%
27	Morelos	359,972	19,660	36,271	▲1.64%	$10,009	1.06%
28	Zacatecas	330,708	18,062	33,322	▲3.39%	$10,788	0.94%
29	Baja California Sur	255,734	13,967	25,768	▲3.39%	$16,009	0.75%
30	Nayarit	227,473	12,424	22,920	▼0.93%	$10,041	0.67%
31	Colima	222,412	12,147	22,410	▲3.17%	$16,884	0.66%
32	Tlaxcala	200,858	10,970	20,239	▲1.45%	$7,463	0.59%
Mexico		33,913,877	1,852,225	3,417,188	▲1.45%	$13,967	100%

Top 30 metro areas of Mexico with most GDP:

Metropolitan areas by GDP 2021 (millions)
Metropolitan area	Position	GDP (MXN)	GDP (USD)	PPP (Int$)	Population	GDP per capita (USD)	PPP per capita (Int$)
Mexico	-	25,803,508	1,272,839	2,569,222	126,705,138	10,046	20,277
Valley of Mexico	1	5,897,909	290,933	587,247	21,804,515	13,343	26,932
Monterrey	2	2,050,414	101,143	204,157	5,341,171	18,937	38,223
Guadalajara	3	1,309,083	64,575	130,344	5,268,642	12,256	24,740
Tijuana	4	649,954	32,061	64,715	2,157,853	14,858	29,991
Toluca	5	626,230	30,891	62,353	2,353,924	13,123	26,489
Puebla-Tlaxcala	6	575,561	28,391	57,308	3,199,530	8,874	17,911
Querétaro	7	482,631	23,807	48,055	1,594,212	14,934	30,143
León	8	440,046	21,707	43,815	1,924,771	11,278	22,764
Saltillo	9	397,449	19,605	39,573	1,031,779	19,002	38,355
Juárez	10	363,107	17,911	36,154	1,512,450	11,843	23,904
San Luis Potosí	11	354,542	17,489	35,301	1,271,366	13,756	27,766
Hermosillo	12	352,152	17,371	35,063	936,263	18,554	37,450
La Laguna	13	332,734	16,413	33,130	1,434,283	11,443	23,099
Veracruz	14	305,487	15,069	30,417	939,046	16,047	32,391
Aguascalientes	15	296,206	14,611	29,493	1,140,916	12,807	25,850
Chihuahua	16	279,865	13,805	27,865	988,065	13,972	28,202
Mérida	17	269,603	13,299	26,844	1,316,088	10,105	20,397
Villahermosa	18	268,490	13,244	26,733	833,907	15,882	32,058
Tampico	19	263,139	12,980	26,200	927,379	13,997	28,252
Mexicali	20	248,772	12,271	24,770	1,049,792	11,689	23,595
Culiacán	21	226,191	11,158	22,522	1,003,530	11,118	22,442
Cancún	22	210,735	10,395	20,983	934,189	11,127	22,461
Minatitlán	23	203,271	10,027	20,239	359,228	27,913	56,341
Reynosa	24	200,111	9,871	19,924	837,251	11,790	23,798
Xalapa	25	190,494	9,397	18,967	789,157	11,907	24,035
Morelia	26	185,703	9,160	18,490	988,704	9,265	18,701
Cuernavaca	27	180,226	8,890	17,945	1,028,589	8,643	17,446
Tehuantepec	28	149,853	7,392	14,921	179,870	41,096	82,952
Mazatlán	29	147,507	7,276	14,687	501,441	14,511	29,290
Celaya	30	145,432	7,174	14,480	767,104	9,352	18,877

== See also ==
- List of Mexican states by GDP per capita
- List of Mexican states by Human Development Index

General:

- List of states of Mexico
- Ranked list of Mexican states
