= List of Mexican states by unemployment =

This article lists the variation in Mexican unemployment statistics by state. As of the 4th quarter 2025, the national unemployment rate is 2.4. The state with the lowest reported unemployment rate is Oaxaca at 1.3%. The state with the highest unemployment rate is Tabasco at 4,2%.

== Mexican states ==
Name	Flag	4th quarter 2025
Aguascalientes		2.7
Baja California		2.7
Baja California Sur		2.3
Campeche		2.9
Chiapas		2.6
Chihuahua		2.2
Coahuila		3.1
Colima		1.5
Ciudad de México		3.3
Durango		2.3
Guanajuato		3.0
Guerrero		1.3
Hidalgo		2.2
Jalisco		3.0
México		1.4
Michoacán		2.8
Morelos		2.1
Nayarit		1.8
Nuevo León		2.8
Oaxaca		1.3
Puebla		1.9
Querétaro		2.4
Quintana Roo		3.0
San Luis Potosí		2.7
Sinaloa		2.5
Sonora		3.5
Tabasco		4.2
Tamaulipas		4.7
Tlaxcala		4.5
Veracruz		2.0
Yucatán		1.5
Zacatecas		2.0

== See also ==
- List of Mexican states by HDI

General:

- Mexican economy
