= Geography of Mexico =

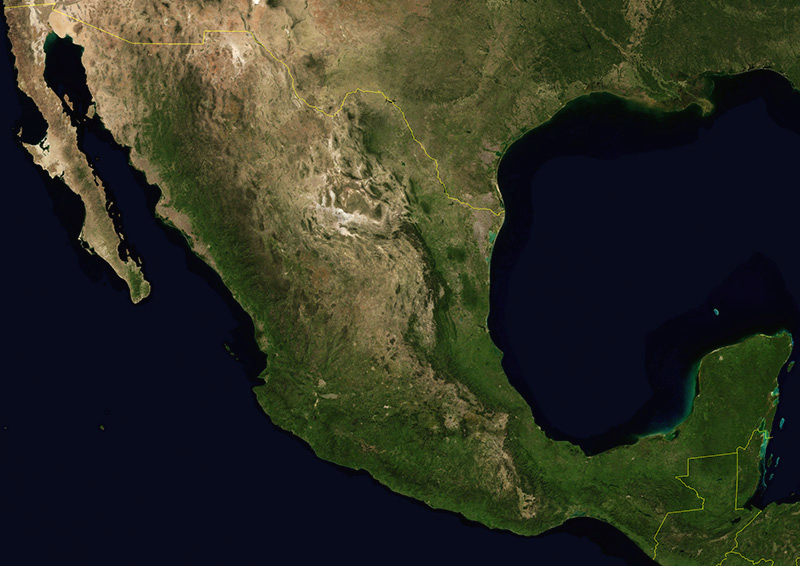
- Continent: North America
- Coordinates: 23°00′N 102°00′W
- Area
  - Total: 1,972,550 km^{2} (761,610 sq mi)
  - Land: 98.96%
  - Water: 1.04%
- Coastline: 9,330 km (5,800 mi)
- Borders: Total land borders 4,263 km
- Highest point: Pico de Orizaba volcano 5,700 m
- Lowest point: Laguna Salada -10 m
- Longest river: Rio Grande; 3,108 km
- Largest lake: Lake Chapala; 1,100 km^{2} (420 mi^{2})
- Exclusive economic zone: 3,269,386 km^{2} (1,262,317 mi^{2})

Mexico map of states and capitals

The geography of Mexico describes the geographic features of Mexico, a country in the Americas. Mexico is located at about 23° N and 102° W in the southern portion of North America. From its farthest land points, Mexico is a little over 3,200 km (2,000 mi) in length. Mexico is bounded to the north by the United States (specifically, from west to east, by California, Arizona, New Mexico, and Texas), to the west and south by the Pacific Ocean, to the east by the Gulf of Mexico, and to the southeast by Belize, Guatemala, and the Caribbean Sea. The northernmost constituent of Latin America, it is the most populous Spanish-speaking country in the world. Mexico is the world's 13th largest country, nearly three times the size of Texas.

Almost all of Mexico is on the North American plate, with small parts of the Baja California peninsula in the northwest on the Pacific and Cocos plates. Some geographers include the portion east of the Isthmus of Tehuantepec including the Yucatán Peninsula within North America. This portion includes Campeche, Chiapas, Tabasco, Quintana Roo, and Yucatán, representing 12.1 percent of the country's total area. Alternatively, the Trans-Mexican Volcanic Belt may be said to delimit the region physiographically on the north. Geopolitically, Mexico is generally not considered part of Central America. Politically, Mexico is divided into thirty-two states.

As well as numerous neighbouring islands, Mexican territory includes the more remote Isla Guadalupe and the Revillagigedo Islands in the Pacific. Mexico's total area covers 1,972,550 square kilometers, including approximately 6,000 square kilometers of islands in the Pacific Ocean, Gulf of Mexico, Caribbean Sea, and Gulf of California. On its north, Mexico shares a 5,000-kilometer border with the United States. The meandering Río Bravo del Norte (known as the Rio Grande in the United States) defines the border from Ciudad Juárez east to the Gulf of Mexico. A series of natural and artificial markers delineate the Mexico–United States border west from Ciudad Juárez to the Pacific Ocean. The Mexico–U.S. boundary is jointly administered by the International Boundary and Water Commission. On its south, Mexico shares an 871 kilometer border with Guatemala and a 251-kilometer border with Belize.

Mexico has a 9,330-kilometer coastline, of which 7,338 kilometers face the Pacific Ocean and the Gulf of California, and the remaining 2,805 kilometers front the Gulf of Mexico and the Caribbean Sea. Mexico's exclusive economic zone (EEZ) covers 3,269,386 km^{2} (1,262,317 mi^{2}) and is the 13th largest in the world. It extends 200 mi (320 km) nautical miles off each coast. The landmass of Mexico dramatically narrows as it moves in a southeasterly direction from the United States border and then abruptly curves northward before ending in the 500-kilometer-long Yucatán Peninsula.

== Physical features ==
=== Mountain ranges and elevations ===
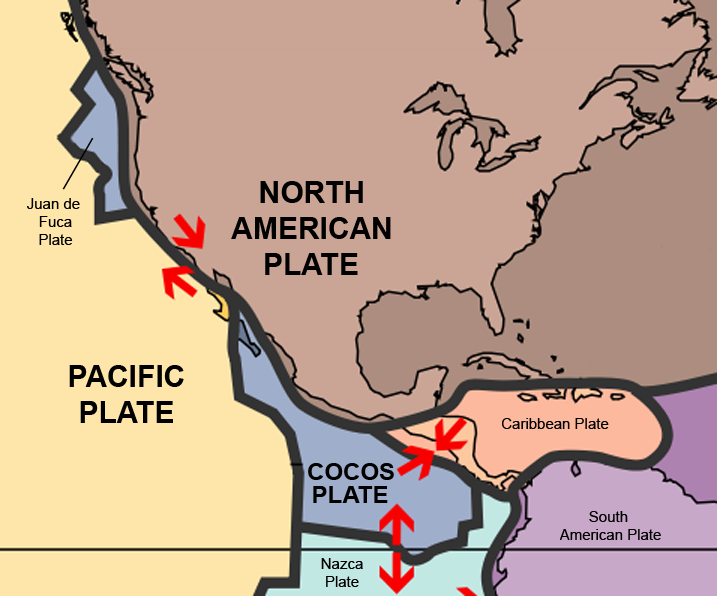
Mexico rests mostly in the North American plate

Beginning approximately 50 kilometres (31 mi) from the United States border, the Sierra Madre Occidental mountain range extends about 1,250 kilometres (780 mi) south to the Río Santiago, where it merges with the Cordillera Neovolcánica range that runs east–west across central Mexico. The Sierra Madre Occidental lies approximately 300 kilometres (190 mi) inland from the west coast of Mexico at its northern end, and approaches to within fifty kilometers of the coast near the Cordillera Neovolcánica. The northwest coastal plain is the name given the lowland area between the Sierra Madre Occidental and the Gulf of California. The Sierra Madre Occidental averages 2,250 metres (7,380 ft) in elevation, with peaks reaching 3,000 metres (9,800 ft).

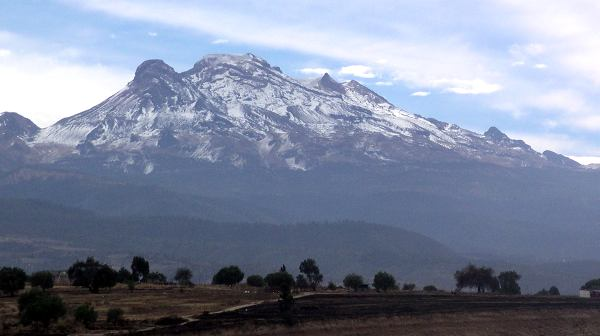
Iztaccíhuatl mountain near Mexico City. It is characterized by its snow-capped summit and rugged terrain, including steep slopes and glaciers.

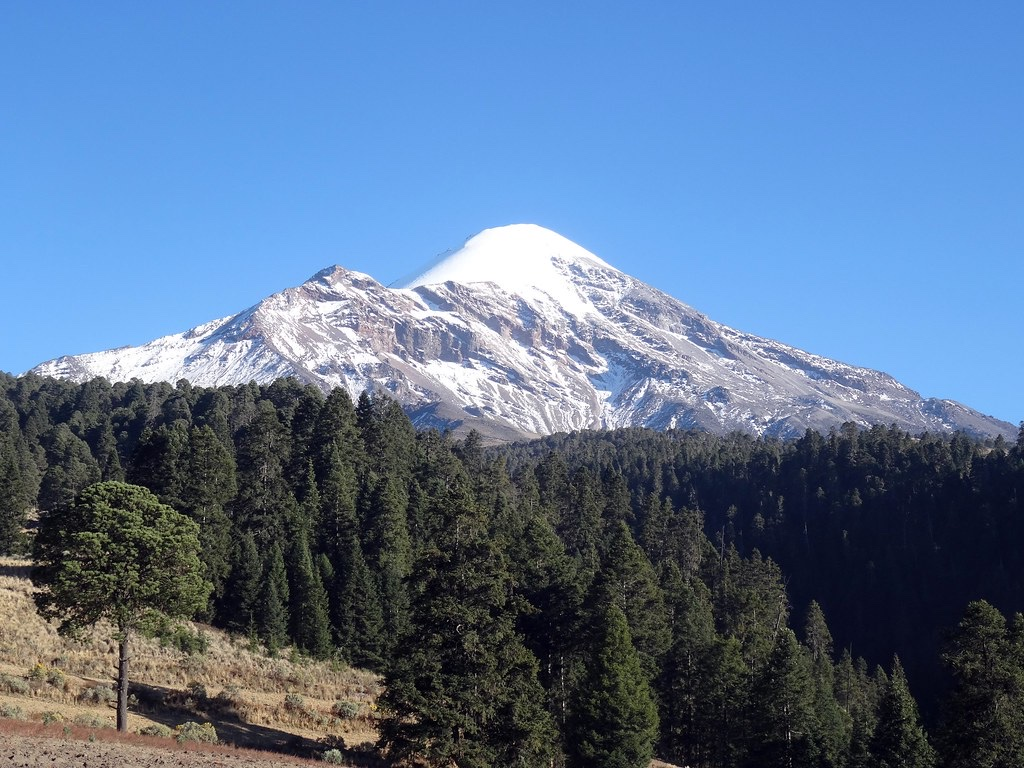
Pico de Orizaba, also known as Citlaltépetl, is the highest mountain in Mexico and the third highest peak in North America, after Denali in Alaska and Mount Logan in Canada.

The Sierra Madre Oriental mountain range starts at the Big Bend region of the border with the U.S. state of Texas and continues 1,350 kilometres (840 mi) until reaching Cofre de Perote, one of the major peaks of the Cordillera Neovolcánica. As is the case with the Sierra Madre Occidental, the Sierra Madre Oriental comes progressively closer to the coastline as it approaches its southern terminus, reaching to within 75 kilometres (47 mi) of the Gulf of Mexico. The northeast coastal plain extends from the eastern slope of the Sierra Madre Oriental to the Gulf of Mexico. The median elevation of the Sierra Madre Oriental is 2,200 metres (7,200 ft), with some peaks at 3,000 metres (9,800 ft).

The Mexican Altiplano, stretching from the United States border to the Cordillera Neovolcánica, occupies the vast expanse of land between the eastern and western sierra madres. A low east–west range divides the altiplano into northern and southern sections. These two sections, previously called the Mesa del Norte and Mesa Central, are now regarded by geographers as sections of one altiplano. The northern altiplano averages 1,100 meters in elevation and continues south from the Río Bravo del Norte through the states of Zacatecas and San Luis Potosí.

Narrow, isolated ridges cross the plateaus of the northern altiplano. Numerous depressions dot the region, the largest of which is the Bolsón de Mapimí. The southern Altiplano is higher than its northern counterpart, averaging 2,000 metres (6,600 ft) in elevation. The southern altiplano contains numerous valleys originally formed by ancient lakes. Several of Mexico's most prominent cities, including Mexico City and Guadalajara, are located in the valleys of the southern Altiplano.

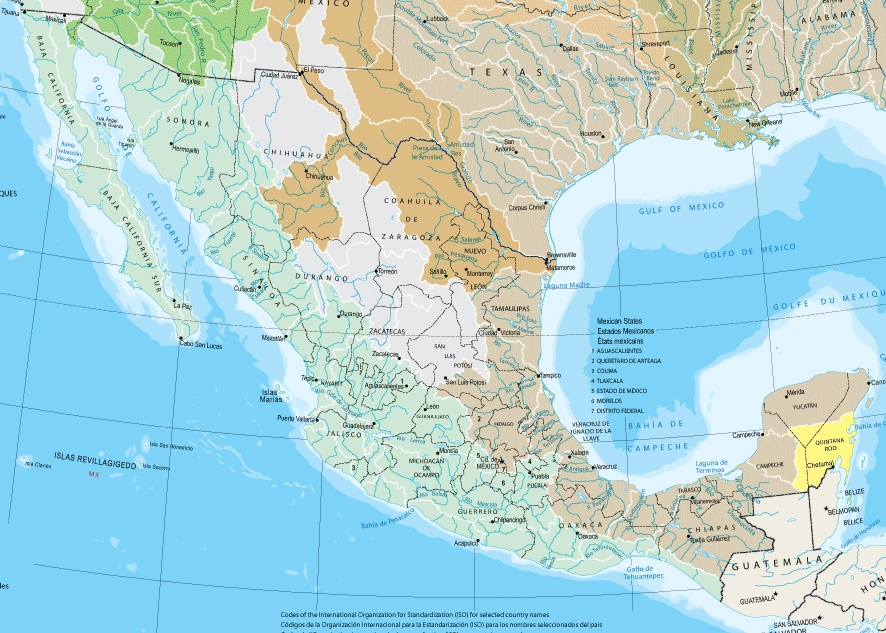
Watersheds of Mexico. Basins in blue drain to the Pacific, in brown to the Gulf of Mexico, and in yellow to the Caribbean Sea. Grey indicates interior basins that do not drain to the sea.

One other significant mountain range, the Peninsular Ranges, cuts across the landscape of the northern half of Mexico. A southern extension of the California coastal ranges that parallel California's coast, the Mexican portion of the Peninsular Ranges extends from the United States border to the southern tip of the Baja California peninsula, a distance of 1,430 kilometres (890 mi). Peaks in the California system range in altitude from 2,200 metres (7,200 ft) in the north to only 250 metres (820 ft) near La Paz in the south.

Narrow lowlands are found on the Pacific Ocean and the Gulf of California sides of the mountains. The Cordillera Neovolcánica is a belt 900 kilometres (560 mi) long and 130 kilometres (81 mi) wide, extending from the Pacific Ocean to the Gulf of Mexico. The Cordillera Neovolcánica begins at the Río Grande de Santiago and continues south to Colima, where it turns east along the nineteenth parallel to the central portion of the state of Veracruz.

The region is distinguished by considerable seismic activity and contains Mexico's highest volcanic peaks. This range contains three peaks exceeding 5,000 metres (16,000 ft): Pico de Orizaba (Citlaltépetl)—the third highest mountain in North America—and Popocatépetl and Iztaccíhuatl near Mexico City. The Cordillera Neovolcánica is regarded as the geological dividing line between North America and Central America.

Several important mountain ranges dominate the landscape of southern and southeastern Mexico. The Sierra Madre del Sur extends 1,200 kilometers along Mexico's southern coast from the southwestern part of the Cordillera Neovolcánica to the nearly flat isthmus of Tehuantepec. Mountains in this range average 2,000 meters in elevation. The range averages 100 kilometers wide, but widens to 150 kilometers in the state of Oaxaca. The narrow southwest coastal plain extends from the Sierra Madre del Sur to the Pacific Ocean.

The Sierra Madre de Oaxaca begins at Pico de Orizaba and extends in a southeasterly direction for 300 kilometers until reaching the isthmus of Tehuantepec. Peaks in the Sierra Madre de Oaxaca average 2,500 meters in elevation, with some peaks exceeding 3,000 meters. South of the isthmus of Tehuantepec, the Sierra Madre de Chiapas runs 280 kilometers along the Pacific Coast from the Oaxaca-Chiapas border to Mexico's border with Guatemala. Although average elevation is only 1,500 meters, one peak—Volcán de Tacuma—exceeds 4,000 meters in elevation. The Meseta Central de Chiapas extends 250 kilometers through the central part of Chiapas to Guatemala. The average height of peaks of the Meseta Central de Chiapas is 2,000 meters. The Chiapas central valley separates the Meseta Central de Chiapas and the Sierra Madre de Chiapas.

=== Rivers and other bodies of water ===
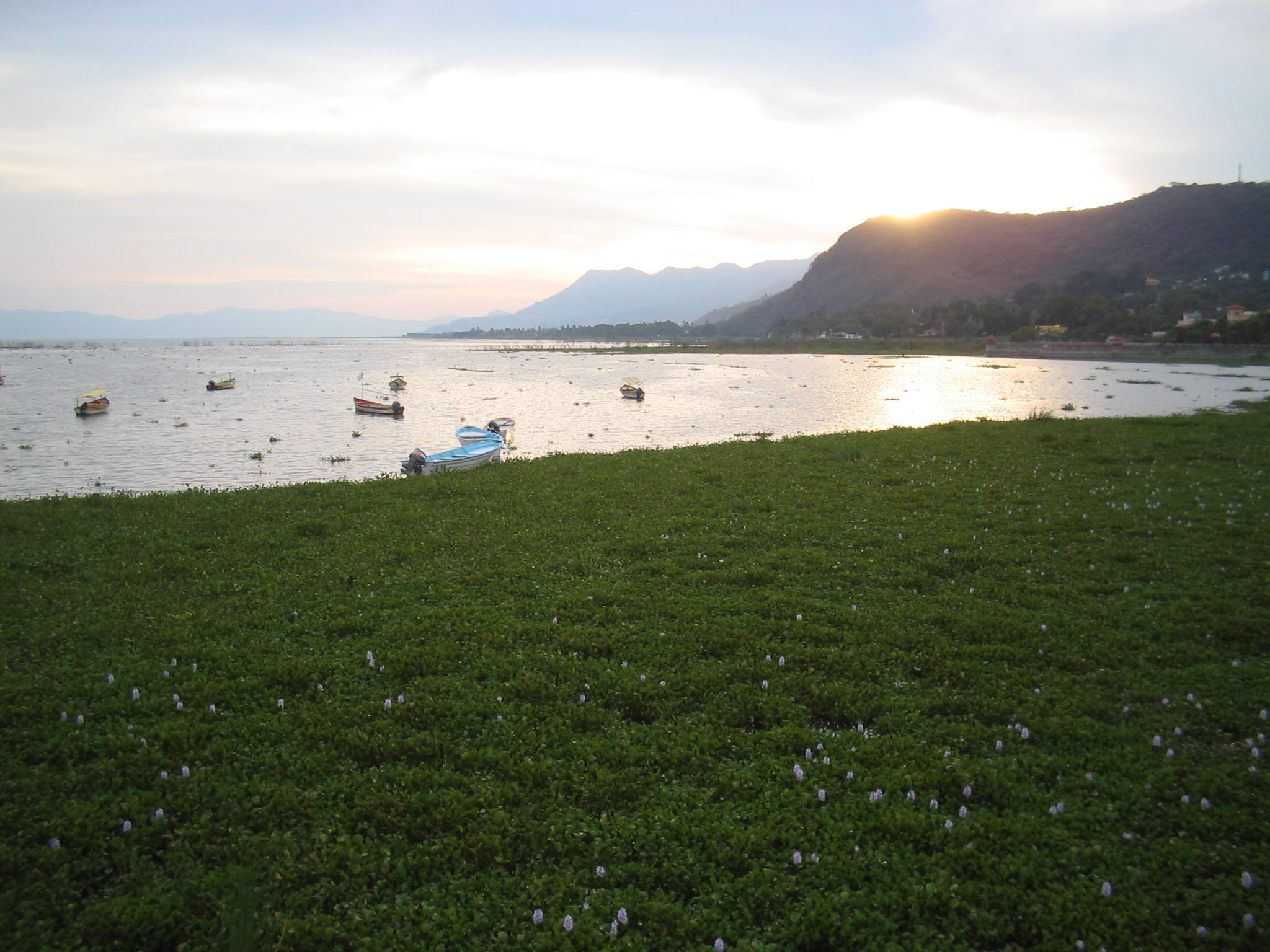
Lake Chapala, Mexico's largest freshwater lake.

Mexico has nearly 150 rivers, two-thirds of which empty into the Pacific Ocean and the remainder of which flow into the Gulf of Mexico or the Caribbean Sea. Despite this apparent abundance of water, water volume is unevenly distributed throughout the country. Indeed, five rivers—the Usumacinta, Grijalva, Papaloapán, Coatzacoalcos, and Pánuco—account for 52 percent of Mexico's average annual volume of surface water.

All five rivers flow into the Gulf of Mexico. Only the Río Pánuco is outside southeastern Mexico, which contains approximately 15 percent of national territory and 12 percent of the national population. In contrast, northern and central Mexico, with 47 percent of the national area and almost 60 percent of Mexico's population, have less than 10 percent of the country's water resources.

In 2024, a team of oceanographers discovered the world's deepest blue hole, Taam Ja, meaning 'deep waters' in Mayan, in Chetumal Bay, Mexico. Due to technical limitations, the actual depth of the hole is still unknown. The findings suggest the presence of a complex labyrinth of underground caves and tunnels, which could shed new light on the site and the diversity of life within it.

== Seismic activity ==
A map of earthquakes in Mexico from 1990 to 2017

Situated atop three of the large tectonic plates that constitute the Earth's surface, Mexico is one of the most seismologically active regions on Earth. The motion of these plates causes earthquakes and volcanic activity.

Most of the Mexican landmass rests on the westward moving North American plate. The Pacific Ocean floor off southern Mexico, however, is being carried northeast by the underlying motion of the Cocos plate. Ocean floor material is relatively dense; when it strikes the lighter granite of the Mexican landmass, the ocean floor is forced under the landmass, creating the deep Middle America Trench that lies off Mexico's southern coast.

The westward moving land atop the North American plate is slowed and crumpled where it meets the Cocos plate, creating the mountain ranges of southern Mexico. The subduction of the Cocos plate accounts for the frequency of earthquakes near Mexico's southern coast. As the rocks constituting the ocean floor are forced down, they melt, and the molten material is forced up through weaknesses in the surface rock, creating the volcanoes in the Cordillera Neovolcánica across central Mexico.

Areas of Mexico's coastline on the Gulf of California, including the Baja California Peninsula, are riding northwestward on the Pacific plate. Rather than one plate subducting, the Pacific and North American plates grind past each other, creating a slip fault that is the southern extension of the San Andreas Fault in California. Motion along this fault in the past pulled Baja California away from the coast, creating the Gulf of California. Continued motion along this fault is the source of earthquakes in western Mexico.

Mexico has a long history of destructive earthquakes and volcanic eruptions. In September 1985, an earthquake measuring 8.0 on the moment magnitude scale and centered in the subduction zone off Acapulco killed more than 4,000 people in Mexico City, more than 300 kilometers away. Volcán de Colima, south of Guadalajara, erupted in 1994, and El Chichón, in southern Mexico, underwent a violent eruption in 1983. Parícutin in northwest Mexico began as puffs of smoke in a cornfield in 1943; a decade later the volcano was 424 meters high.

Although dormant for decades, Popocatépetl and Iztaccíhuatl ("smoking warrior" and "white lady," respectively, in Nahuatl) occasionally send out puffs of smoke clearly visible in Mexico City, a reminder to the capital's inhabitants that volcanic activity is near. Popocatépetl showed renewed activity in 1995 and 1996, forcing the evacuation of several nearby villages and causing concern by seismologists and government officials about the effect that a large-scale eruption might have on the heavily populated region nearby.

== Climate ==
A Köppen Climate Classification map of Mexico

The Tropic of Cancer effectively divides the country into temperate and tropical zones. Land north of the twenty-fourth parallel experiences cooler temperatures during the winter months. South of the twenty-fourth parallel, temperatures are fairly constant year round and vary solely as a function of elevation.

Areas south of the twentieth-fourth parallel with elevations up to 1,000 meters (3,281 ft) (the southern parts of both coastal plains as well as the Yucatán Peninsula), have a yearly median temperature between 24 and 28 °C (75.2 and 82.4 °F). Temperatures here remain high throughout the year, with only a 5 °C (9 °F) difference between winter and summer median temperatures. Although low-lying areas north of the twentieth-fourth parallel are hot and humid during the summer, they generally have lower yearly temperature averages (from 20 to 24 °C or 68.0 to 75.2 °F) because of more moderate conditions during the winter.

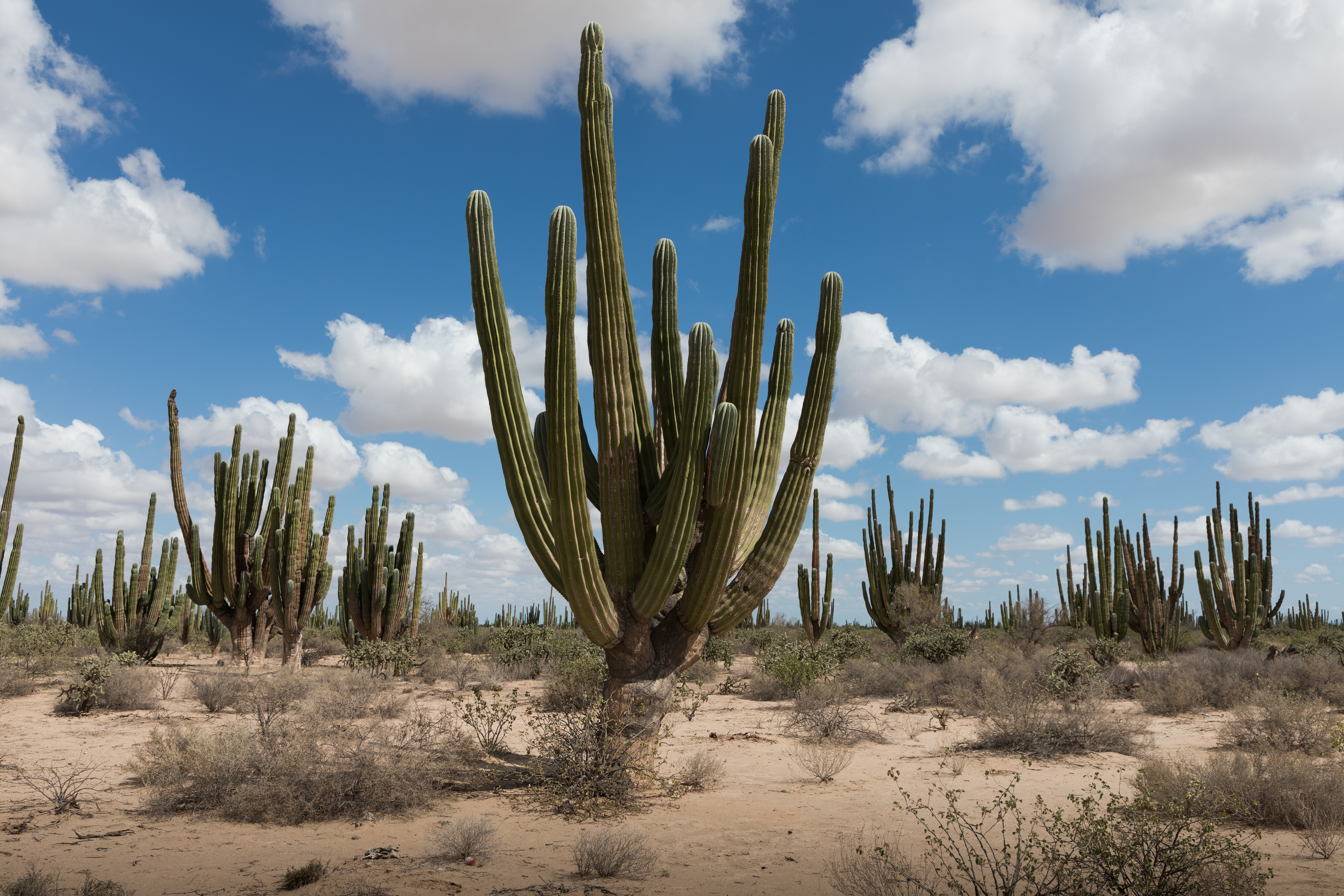
A pachycereus pringlei forest in the Sonoran Desert, Mexico.

Between 1,000 and 2,000 meters (3,281 and 6,562 ft), one encounters yearly average temperatures between 16 and 20 °C (60.8 and 68.0 °F). Towns and cities at this elevation south of the twenty-fourth parallel have relatively constant, pleasant temperatures throughout the year, whereas more northerly locations experience sizeable seasonal variations. Above 2,000 meters (6,562 ft), temperatures drop as low as an average yearly range between 8 and 12 °C (46.4 and 53.6 °F) in the Cordillera Neovolcánica.

At 2,300 meters (7,546 ft), Mexico City has a yearly median temperature of 15 °C (59 °F) with pleasant summers and mild winters. Average daily highs and lows for May, the warmest month, are 26 and 12 °C (78.8 and 53.6 °F), and average daily highs and lows for January, the coldest month, are 19 and 6 °C (66.2 and 42.8 °F). Rainfall varies widely both by location and season.

Arid or semiarid conditions are encountered in the Baja California peninsula, the northwestern state of Sonora, the northern altiplano, and also significant portions of the southern altiplano. Rainfall in these regions averages between 300 and 600 millimeters (11.8 and 23.6 in) per year, although even less in some areas, particularly in the state of Baja California. Average rainfall totals are between 600 and 1,000 millimeters (23.6 and 39.4 in) in most of the major populated areas of the southern altiplano, including Mexico City and Guadalajara.

Low-lying areas along the Gulf of Mexico receive in excess of 1,000 millimeters (39.4 in) of rainfall in an average year, with the wettest region being the southeastern state of Tabasco, which typically receives approximately 2,000 millimeters (78.7 in) of rainfall on an annual basis. Parts of the northern altiplano, highlands and high peaks in the Sierra Madres receive yearly snowfall. Citlaltépetl, Popocatépetl and Iztaccíhuatl continue to support glaciers, the largest of which is the Gran Glaciar Norte.

Mexico has pronounced wet and dry seasons. Most of the country experiences a rainy season from June to mid-October and significantly less rain during the remainder of the year. February and July generally are the driest and wettest months, respectively. Mexico City, for example, receives an average of only 5 millimeters (0.2 in) of rain during February but more than 160 millimeters (6.3 in) in July.

Coastal areas, especially those along the Gulf of Mexico, experience the largest amounts of rain in September. Tabasco typically records more than 300 millimeters (11.8 in) of rain during that month. A small coastal area of northwestern coastal Mexico around Tijuana has a Mediterranean climate with considerable coastal fog and a rainy season that occurs in winter.

Mexico lies squarely within the hurricane belt, and all regions of both coasts are susceptible to these storms from June through November. Hurricanes on the Pacific coast are often less violent than those affecting Mexico's eastern coastline. Several hurricanes per year strike the Caribbean and Gulf of Mexico coastline, however, and these storms bring high winds, heavy rain, extensive damage, and occasional loss of life. Hurricane Gilbert passed directly over Cancún in September 1988, with winds in excess of 200 kilometers per hour (124 mph), producing major damage to hotels in the resort area. It then struck northeast Mexico, where flooding from the heavy rain killed dozens in the Monterrey area and caused extensive damage to livestock and vegetable crops.

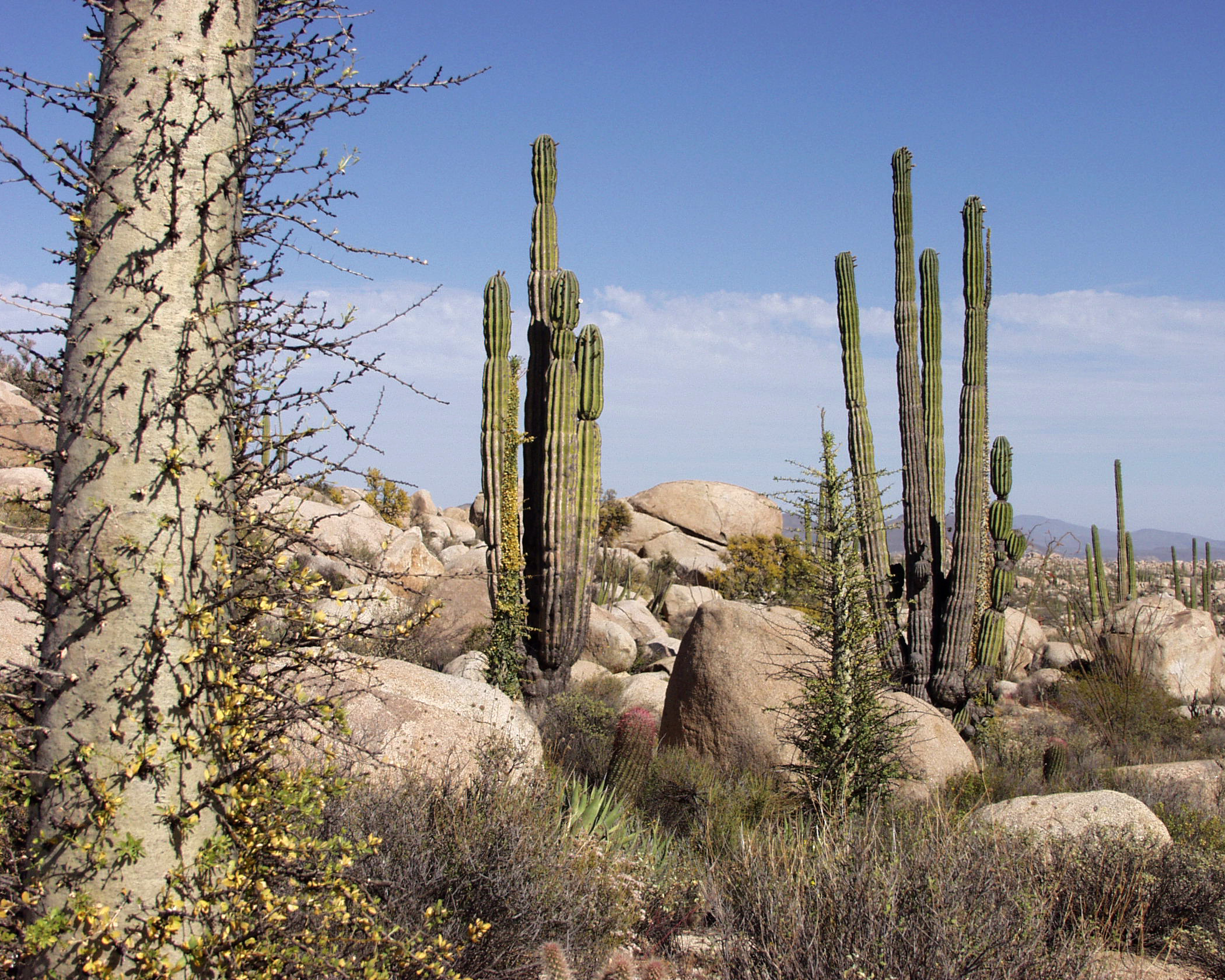
Baja California

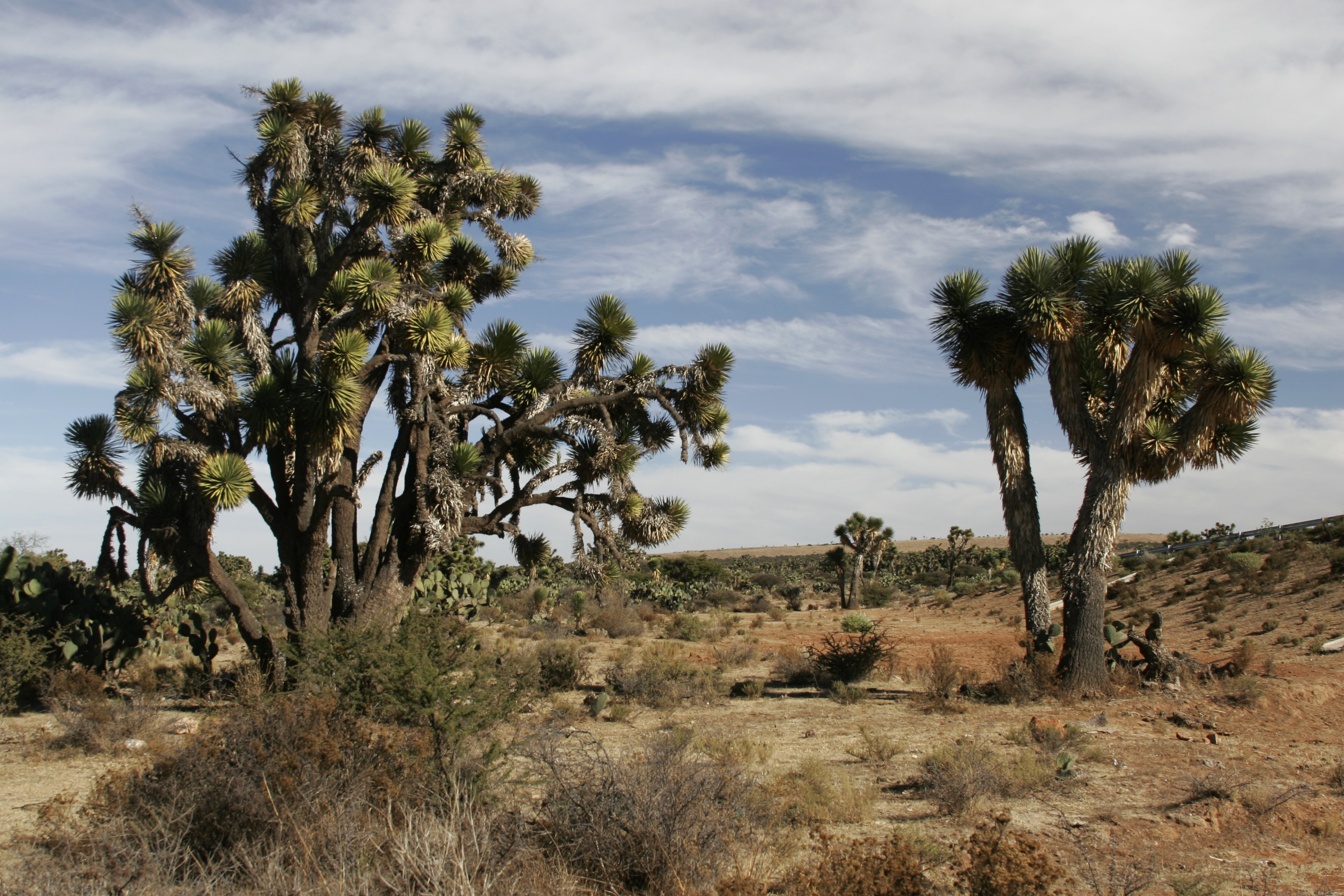
Shrubs, succulents like Yucca decipiens, and small grasses coexisting in the semi-arid desert of Zacatecas. Part of the Chihuahuan Desert.

=== Climate change ===
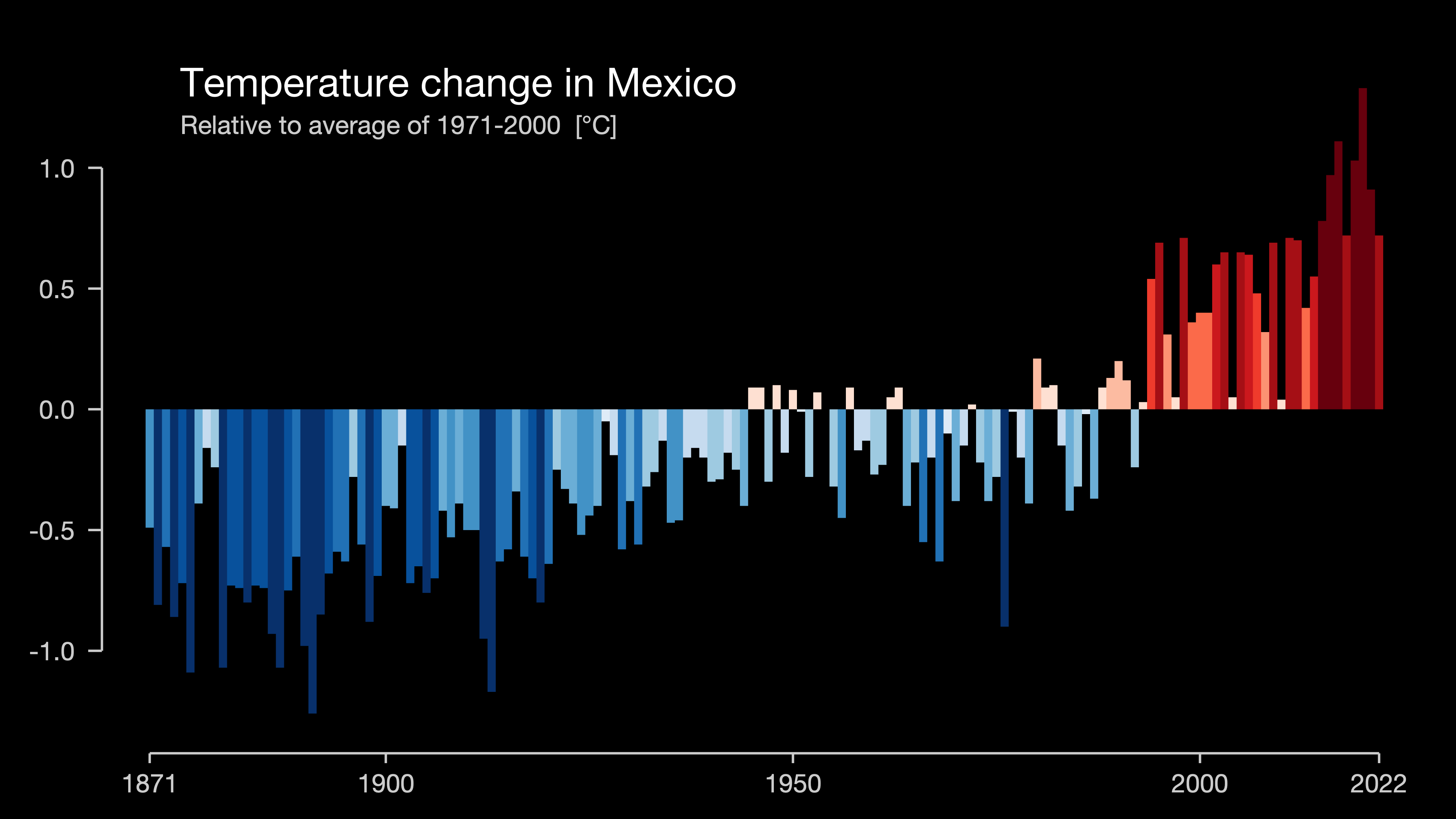
Temperature change in Mexico 1891-2022. Each bar represents the average temperature over that year

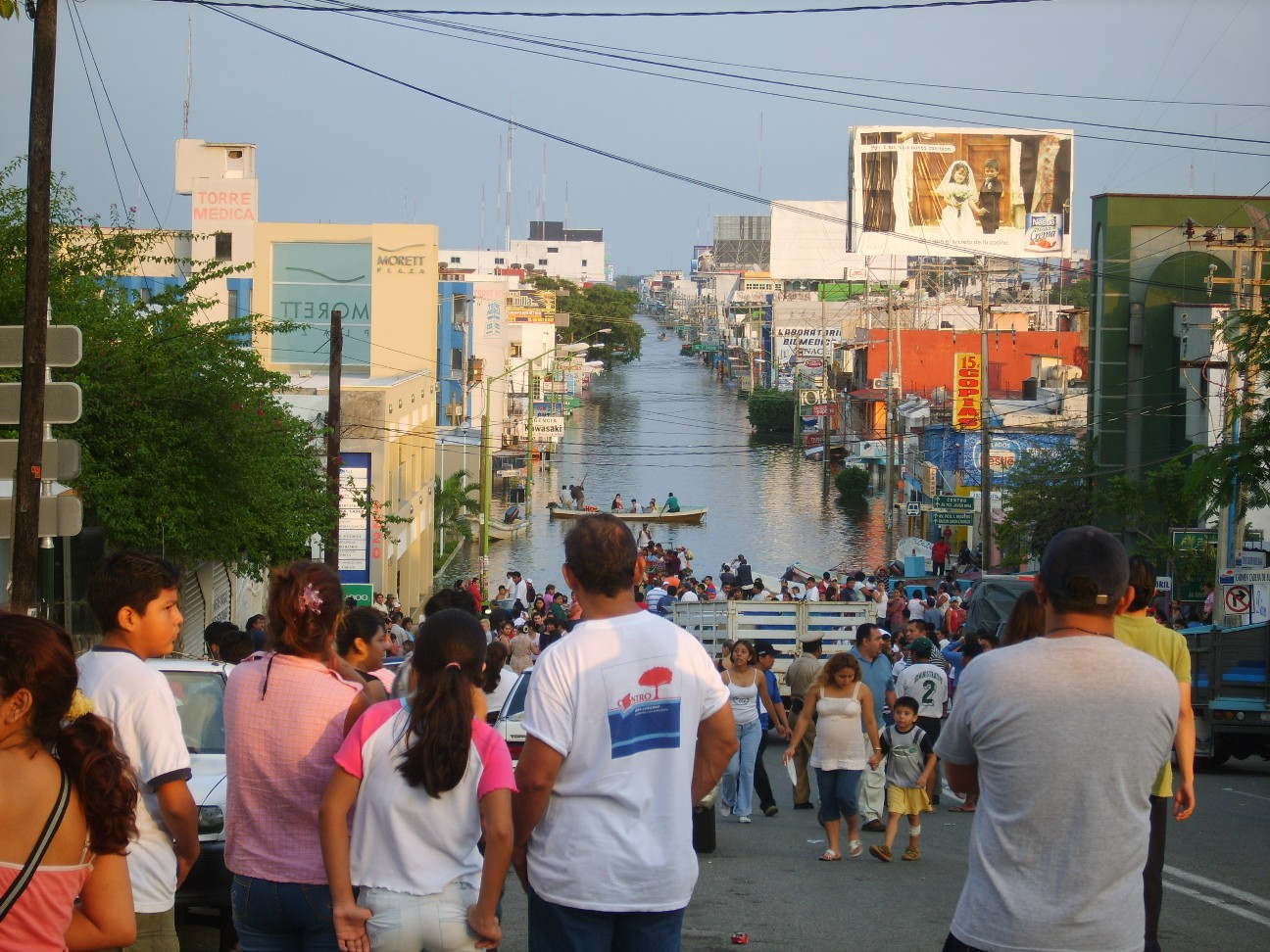
A flash flood in Mexico

Climate change in Mexico is causing widespread, possibly irreversible impacts including rising temperatures, altered precipitation patterns, drought, intensified hurricanes, and sea-level rise in coastal regions. These changes pose threats to water resources and agriculture, with rural communities and smallholder farmers relying on rain-fed agriculture being particularly vulnerable, and affecting crops including maize and coffee, contributing to economic insecurity. Climate change is impacting Mexican's health and exacerbating human migration. Climate change is increasing extinction risk for Mexico's biodiversity, with nearly 500 species listed as critically endangered.

In 2012, Mexico became the first major oil-producing emerging economy to enact climate legislation. Since then, Mexico has significantly increased its renewable electricity generation from wind and solar sources, however it is still dependent on fossil fuels for the majority of its energy. In 2023, Mexico was in the top 15 highest greenhouse gas emitters, contributing over 5 million tonnes, or 1.4% of the global total.

Mexico has committed to reducing greenhouse gas emissions by 35% by 2030, with an increased target of 40% conditional upon external support. Mexico also aims to cut black carbon emissions by 51% unconditionally and 70% with additional support by 2030 and has committed to net zero by 2050. Their updated National Climate Change Strategy emphasizes adaptation and mitigation measures across sectors such as energy, agriculture, water resources, forestry, and coastal zones. However, Climate Action Tracker's 2022 assessment indicated that Mexico's climate policies have regressed, with a renewed emphasis on fossil fuels and the dismantling of climate-related institutions, potentially hindering progress toward emission reduction targets. Mexico's current president, Claudia Sheinbaum, has made new promises to tackle climate change since taking office in October 2024.

== Environmental conditions ==
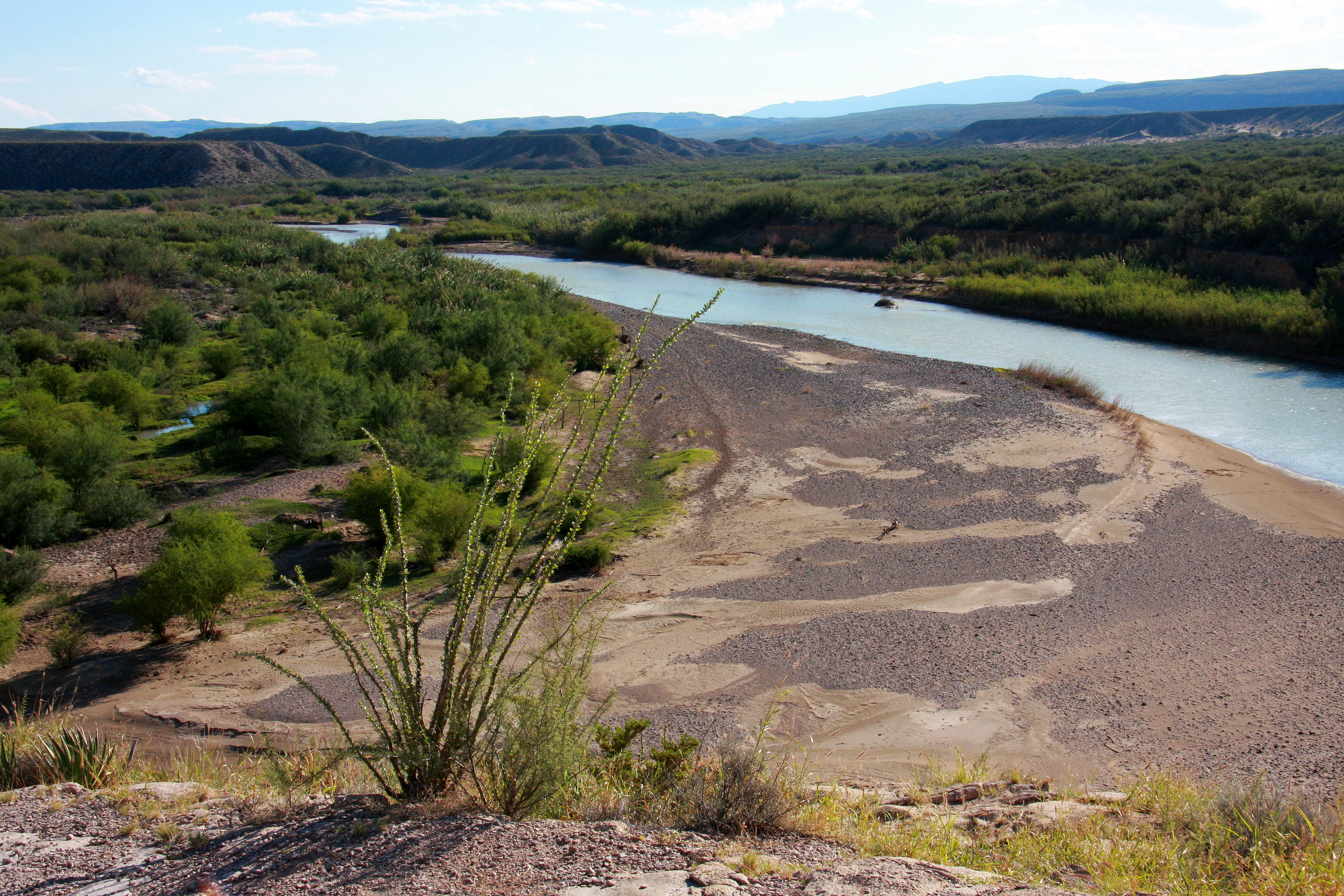
The Rio Grande at Big Bend National Park, on the Mexico–U.S. border

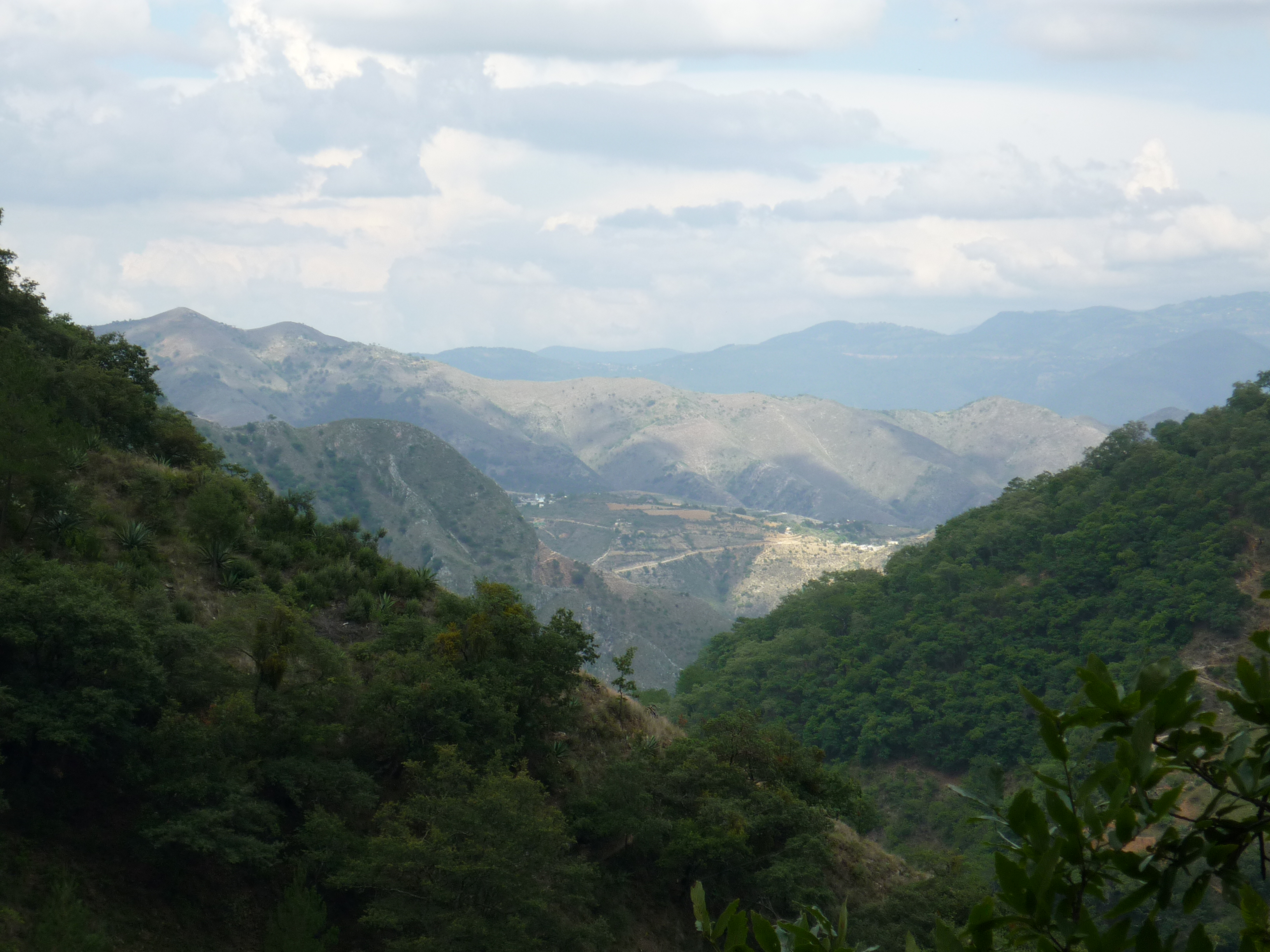
The Sierra Gorda

Mexico faces significant environmental challenges damaging nearly all sections of the country. Soil destruction is particularly pronounced in the north and northwest, with more than 60% of land considered in a total or accelerated state of erosion. Fragile because of its semiarid and arid character, the soil of the region has become increasingly damaged through excessive cattle-raising and irrigation with waters containing high levels of salinity. The result is a mounting problem of desertification throughout the region.

Mexico's vast coastline faces a different, but no less difficult, series of environmental problems. For example, inadequately regulated petroleum exploitation in the Coatzacoalcos-Minatitlán zone in the Gulf of Mexico has caused serious damage to the waters and fisheries of Río Coatzacoalcos. The deadly explosion that racked a working-class neighborhood in Guadalajara in April 1992 serves as an appropriate symbol of environmental damage in Mexico. More than 1,000 barrels (160 m^{3}) of gasoline seeped from a corroded Mexican Petroleum (Petróleos Mexicanos—Pemex) pipeline into the municipal sewer system, where it combined with gases and industrial residuals to produce a massive explosion that killed 190 persons and injured nearly 1,500 others.

Mexico's tourism industry impacts the environment but this can be reduced. Carmona-Morena et al. 2004 & Sánchez-Medina et al. 2015 find Mexico's environmental enforcement in the tourism sector varies between little and nonexistent. Sánchez-Medina finds some change toward environmentally benign practices still occurs but is voluntary and has motives other than financial reward or fear of enforcement. They also find that such progress is slowed by the lack of financial wherewithal these tourism enterprises have.

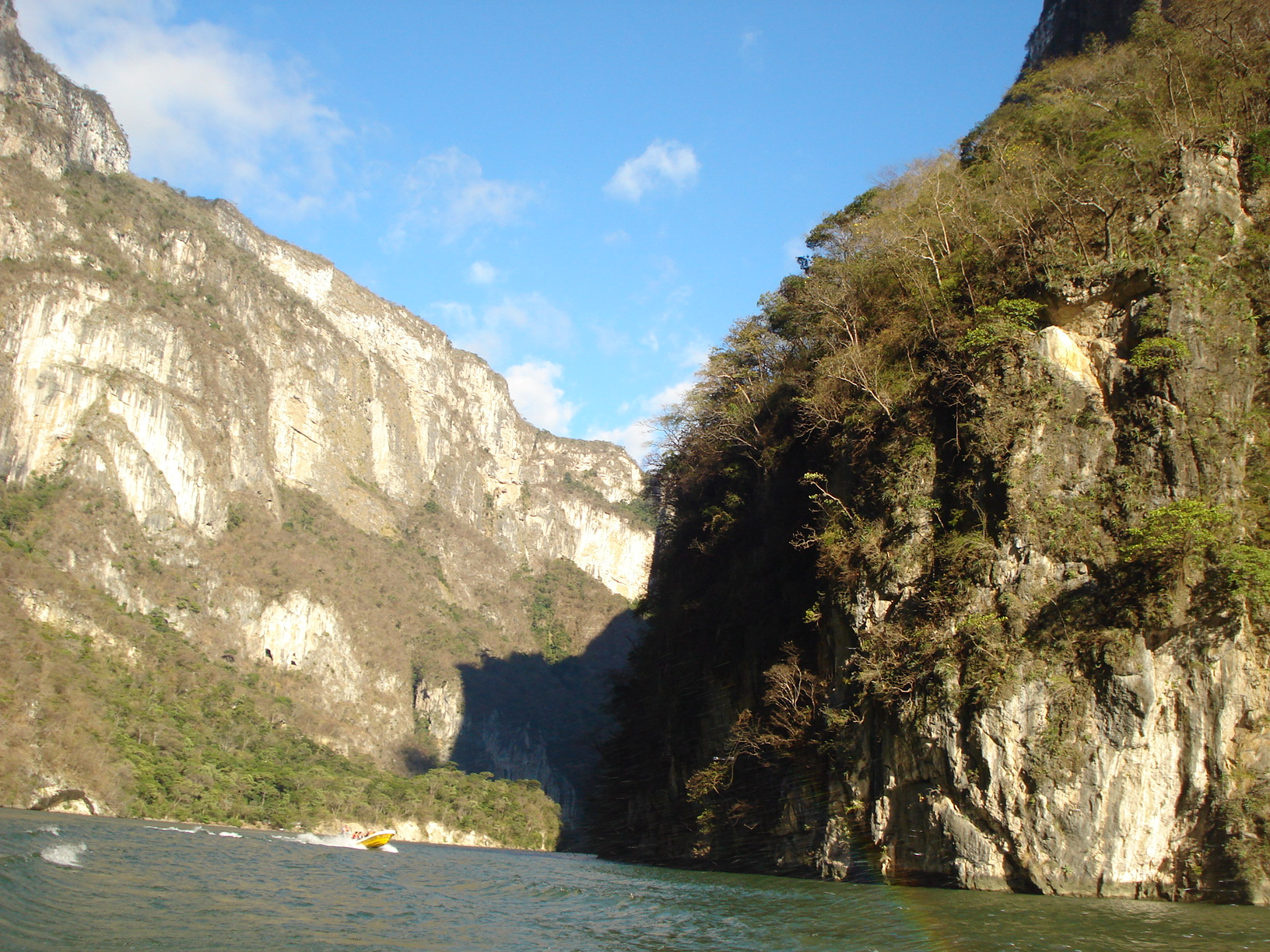
Cañón del Sumidero

Mexico City confronts authorities with perhaps their most daunting environmental challenge. Geography and extreme population levels have combined to produce one of the world's most polluted urban areas. Mexico City sits in a valley surrounded on three sides by mountains, which serve to trap contaminants produced by the metropolitan area's 15 million residents.

A government study in the late 1980s determined that nearly 5 million tons of contaminants were emitted annually in the atmosphere, a tenfold increase over the previous decade. Carbons and hydrocarbons from the region's more than 3 million vehicles account for approximately 80% of these contaminants, with another 15%, primarily of sulfur and nitrogen, coming from industrial plants. The resulting dangerous mix is responsible for a wide range of respiratory illnesses.

A study of twelve urban areas worldwide in the mid-1980s concluded that the residents of Mexico City had the highest levels of lead and cadmium in their blood. The volume of pollutants from Mexico City has damaged the surrounding ecosystem as well. For example, wastewater from Mexico City that flows north and is used for irrigation in the state of Hidalgo has been linked to congenital birth defects and high levels of gastrointestinal diseases in that state.

Beginning in the mid-1980s, the government enacted numerous antipollution policies in Mexico City with varied degrees of success. Measures such as vehicle emissions inspections, the introduction of unleaded gasoline, and the installation of catalytic converters on new vehicles helped reduce pollution generated by trucks and buses. In contrast, one of the government's most prominent actions, the No Driving Day program, may have inadvertently contributed to higher pollution levels.

Under the program, metropolitan area residents were prohibited from driving their vehicles one day each work week based on the last number of their license plate. Those with the resources to do so purchased additional automobiles to use on the day their principal vehicle was prohibited from driving, adding to the region's vehicle stock. Thermal inversions reached such dangerous levels at various times in the mid-1990s that the government declared pollution emergencies, necessitating sharp temporary cutbacks in vehicle use and industrial production.

Mexico has developed a Biodiversity Action Plan to address issues of endangered species and habitats that merit protection.

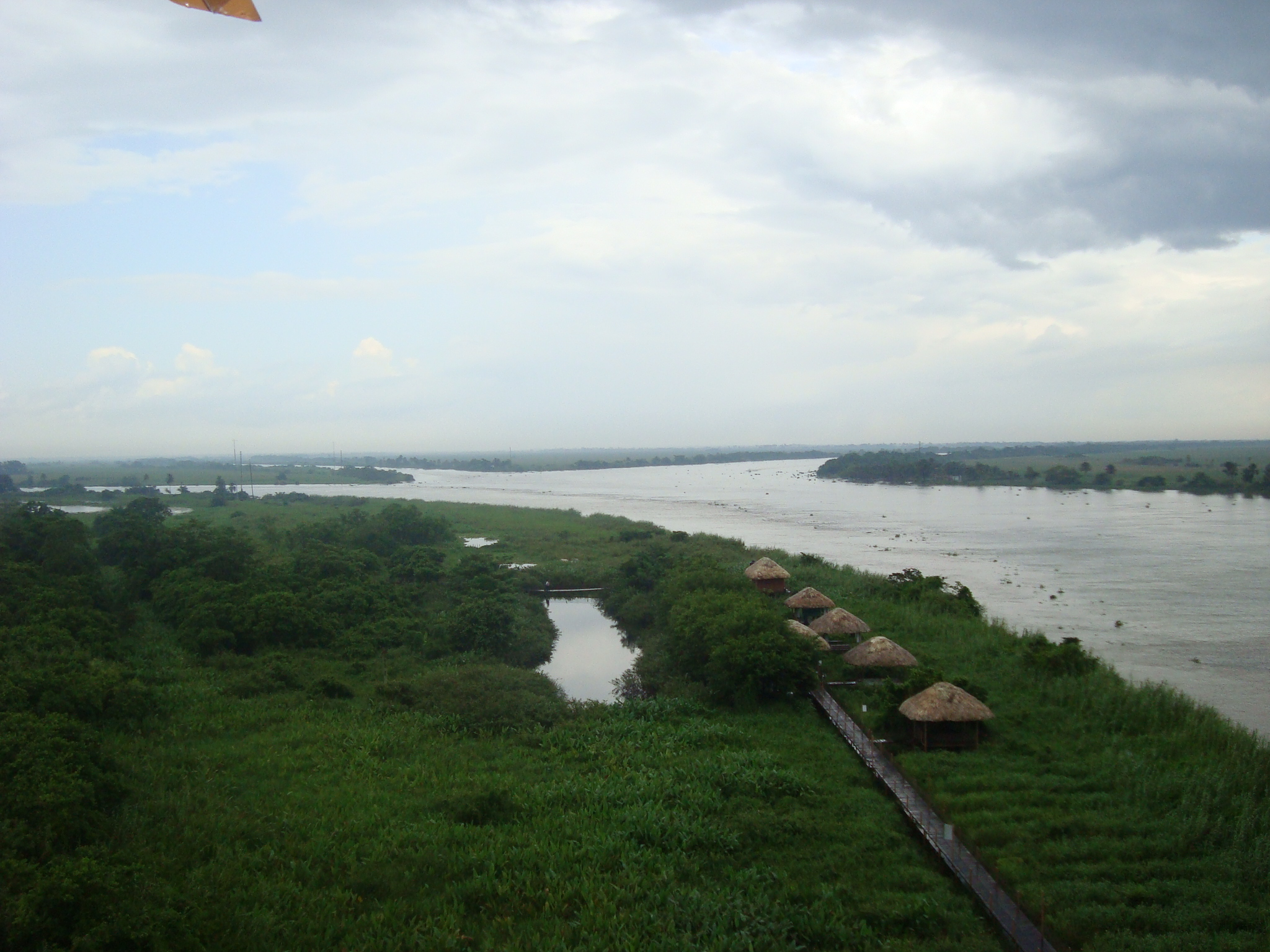
The Usumacinta River, in "Tres Brazos" the Usumacinta joins to San Pedrito river and Grijalva river, in the Wetlands of Centla, biosphere reserve, in Tabasco.

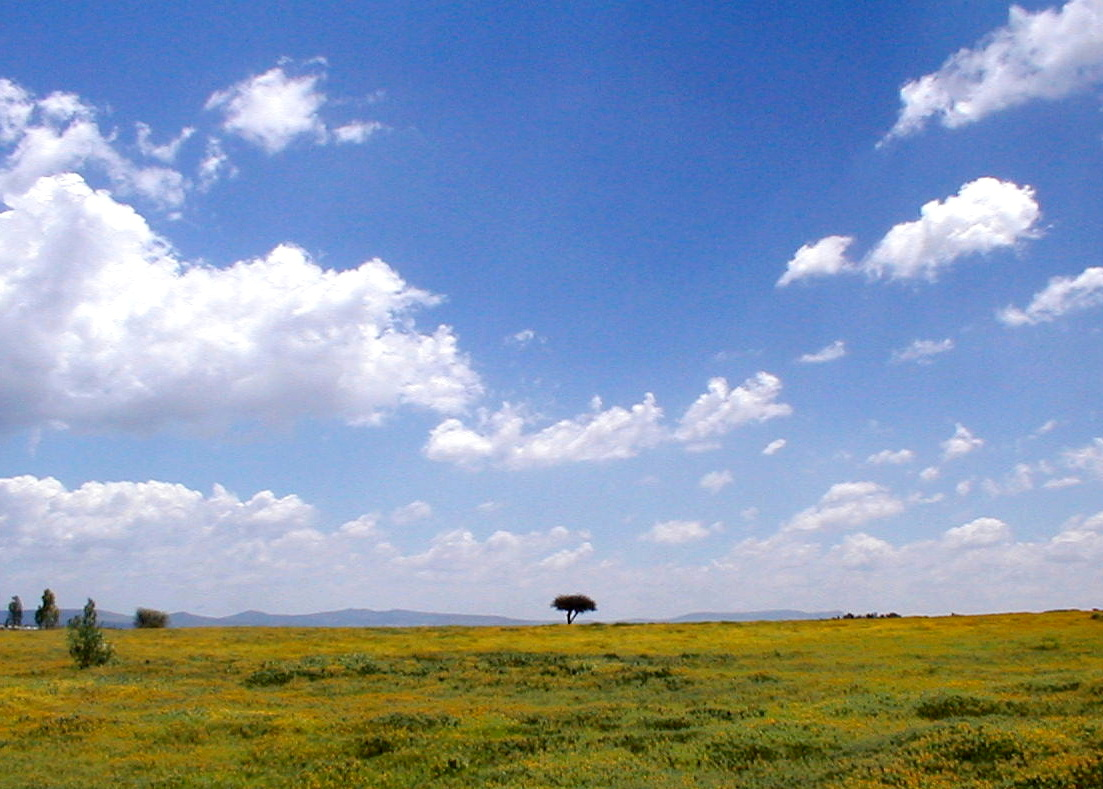
The Mexican Plateau, also known as the Mexican Altiplano or Mesa Central

=== Deforestation ===
Mexico faces significant environmental challenges damaging nearly all sections of the country. Vast expanses of southern and southeastern tropical forests have been denuded due to mineral resource extraction, and then, far behind in second place, for cattle-raising and agriculture. For example, tropical forests covered almost half of the state of Tabasco in 1940 but less than 10% by the late 1980s. During the same period, pastureland increased from 20 to 60% of the state's total area.

Analysts reported similar conditions in other tropical sections of Mexico. Deforestation and desertification has contributed to serious levels of soil erosion nationwide. In 1985 the government classified almost 17% of all land as totally eroded, 31% in an accelerated state of erosion, and 38% demonstrating signs of incipient erosion.

Mexico had a 2018 Forest Landscape Integrity Index mean score of 6.82/10, ranking it 63rd globally out of 172 countries.

==== Tree cover extent and loss ====
Global Forest Watch publishes annual estimates of tree cover loss and 2000 tree cover extent derived from time-series analysis of Landsat satellite imagery in the Global Forest Change dataset. In this framework, tree cover refers to vegetation taller than 5 m (including natural forests and tree plantations), and tree cover loss is defined as the complete removal of tree cover canopy for a given year, regardless of cause.

For Mexico, country statistics report cumulative tree cover loss of 5,216,321 ha (52,163.21 km^{2}) from 2001 to 2024 (about 9.8% of its 2000 tree cover area). For tree cover density greater than 30%, country statistics report a 2000 tree cover extent of 53,168,926 ha (531,689.26 km^{2}). The charts and table below display this data. In simple terms, the annual loss number is the area where tree cover disappeared in that year, and the extent number shows what remains of the 2000 tree cover baseline after subtracting cumulative loss. Forest regrowth is not included in the dataset.

Annual tree cover loss in Mexico, 2001–2024. View chart definition.
Tree cover extent in 2000 minus cumulative tree cover loss in Mexico, 2001–2024 (loss-only residual; does not account for gain). View chart definition.

Annual tree cover extent and loss
Year	Tree cover extent (km2) (Note: This residual measure does not include forest regrowth.)	Annual tree cover loss (km2)
2001	530,106.59	1,582.67
2002	528,518.47	1,588.12
2003	526,993.12	1,525.35
2004	525,294.82	1,698.30
2005	523,226.19	2,068.63
2006	521,435.49	1,790.70
2007	519,249.06	2,186.43
2008	517,405.71	1,843.35
2009	514,594.52	2,811.19
2010	512,926.22	1,668.30
2011	511,057.93	1,868.29
2012	509,310.80	1,747.13
2013	507,121.65	2,189.15
2014	505,415.60	1,706.05
2015	503,440.26	1,975.34
2016	500,700.96	2,739.30
2017	497,714.61	2,986.35
2018	495,042.82	2,671.79
2019	491,769.77	3,273.05
2020	488,776.78	2,992.99
2021	486,886.32	1,890.46
2022	485,097.87	1,788.45
2023	482,834.24	2,263.63
2024	479,526.05	3,308.19

==== REDD+ reference levels and monitoring ====
Mexico has submitted national forest reference emission level (FREL) benchmarks under the UNFCCC REDD+ framework, and each submission has been subject to a UNFCCC technical assessment. On the UNFCCC REDD+ Web Platform, Mexico's Warsaw Framework elements are listed as “reported” for its submissions (national strategy, safeguards information, and a national forest monitoring system), and its reference levels are listed as “assessed”.

Mexico's first national FREL (submitted in 2014 and assessed in 2015) covered the REDD+ activity “reducing emissions from deforestation” at national scale, expressed as a historical average of CO2 emissions from gross deforestation over 2000–2010. The modified/assessed FREL reported by the technical assessment was 44,388,620 t CO2 eq per year. The assessed FREL included the above-ground and below-ground biomass pools and CO2 only, while excluding litter, dead wood and soil organic carbon (in mineral and organic soils).

Mexico submitted an updated national FREL in 2020 (assessed in 2022), with a 2007–2016 historical reference period and an assessed value of 20,245,016 t CO2 eq per year after modification during the technical assessment. This second FREL expanded scope to include emissions from deforestation and a defined subset of forest degradation (“absolute forest degradation”) and expanded pools to include above-ground biomass, below-ground biomass, deadwood and soil organic carbon (while litter was not included). The UNFCCC REDD+ Web Platform also lists Mexico's reported REDD+ results for 2017–2019 (6,041,219 t CO2 eq/year) against the assessed reference level of 20,245,016 t CO2 eq/year, for the reported activities of deforestation and forest degradation.

== General indicators ==
Climate: varies from tropical to desert.

Terrain: high, rugged mountains; low coastal plains; high plateaus; desert.

Elevation extremes:

- lowest point: Laguna Salada -10 m
- highest point: Pico de Orizaba volcano 5,700 m

Natural resources: petroleum, silver, copper, gold, lead, zinc, natural gas and timber.

Land use:

- arable land: 12.98%
- permanent crops: 1.36%
- other: 85.66% (2011)

Irrigated land: 64,600 km^{2} (2009)

Total renewable water resources: 457.2 km^{3}

Natural hazards:

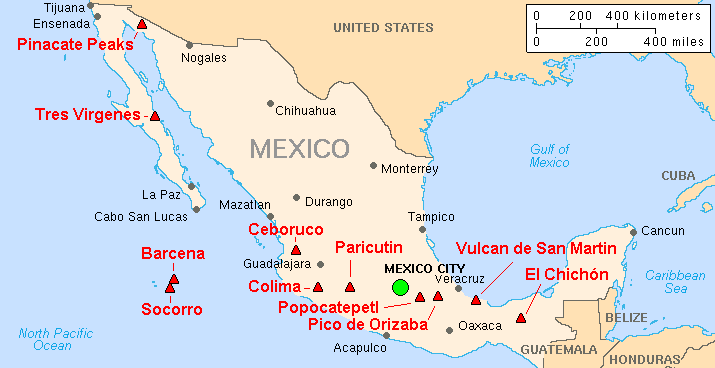
Major active volcanoes of Mexico. From west to east, volcanoes part of the Trans-Mexican Volcanic Belt are Nevado de Colima, Parícutin, Popocatépetl, and Pico de Orizaba.

Tsunamis and tropical cyclones along the Pacific coast, volcanoes and destructive earthquakes in the center and south, and hurricanes on the Gulf of Mexico and Caribbean coasts.
volcanism: volcanic activity in the central-southern part of the country; the volcanoes in Baja California are mostly dormant; Colima (elev. 3,850 m), which erupted in 2010, is Mexico's most active volcano and is responsible for causing periodic evacuations of nearby villagers; it has been deemed a "Decade Volcano" by the International Association of Volcanology and Chemistry of the Earth's Interior, worthy of study due to its explosive history and close proximity to human populations; Popocatepetl (elev. 5,426 m) poses a threat to Mexico City; other historically active volcanoes include Barcena, Ceboruco, El Chichon, Michoacan-Guanajuato, Pico de Orizaba, San Martin, Socorro, and Tacana

Environment – current issues: Natural fresh water resources scarce and polluted in north, inaccessible and poor quality in center and extreme southeast; raw sewage and industrial effluents polluting rivers in urban areas; deforestation; widespread erosion; desertification; serious air pollution in the national capital and urban centers along the US-Mexico border; land subsidence in Valley of Mexico caused by groundwater depletion.

Environment – international agreements: Party to: biodiversity, climate change, climate change-Kyoto Protocol, desertification, endangered species, hazardous wastes, law of the sea, marine dumping, marine life conservation, lzone layer protection, ship pollution, wetlands, whaling.

== See also ==
- 4000 meter peaks of Mexico
- Geology of North America
- List of Ultras of Mexico
- Mountain peaks of Mexico
