= Air pollution in Mexico City =

Poor quality of air in the capital and largest city of Mexico

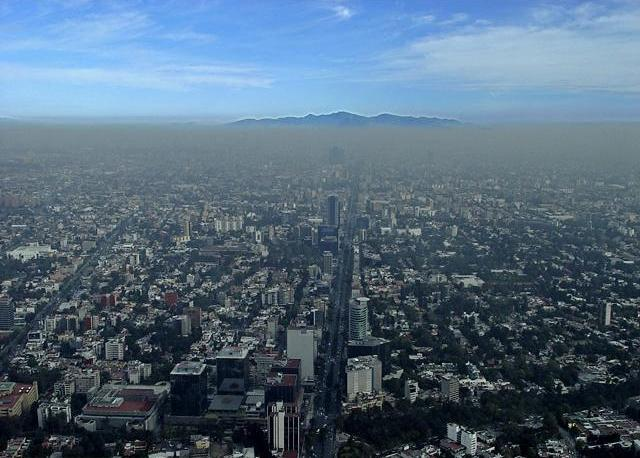
Air Pollution in Mexico City

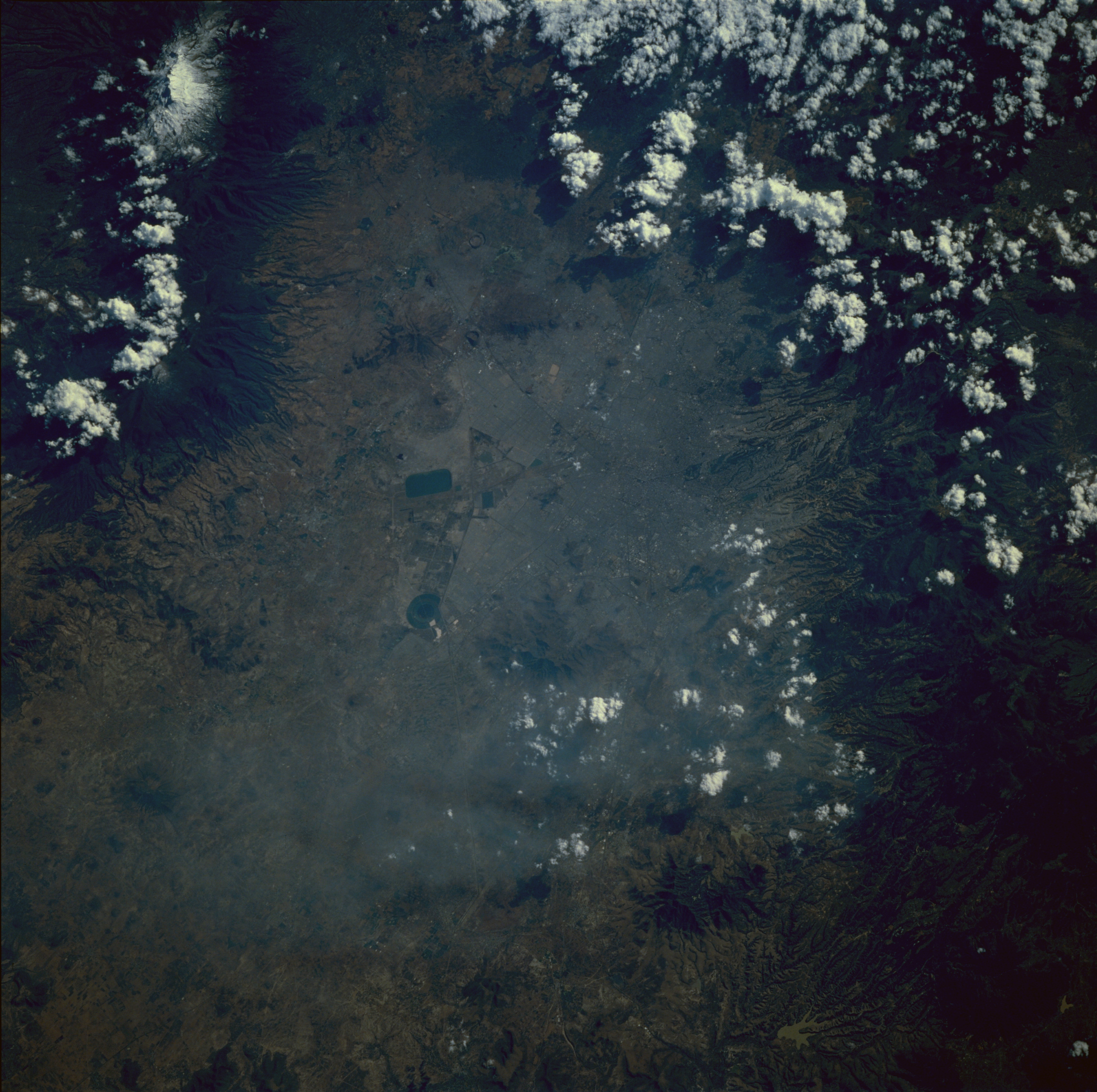
A NASA satellite image of smog in the Valley of Mexico in 1985

Air pollution in Mexico City has been of concern to the city's population and health officials for decades. In the 20th century, Mexico City's population rapidly increased as industrialization brought thousands of migrants from all over the world. Such a rapid and unexpected growth led to the UN declaring Mexico City as the most polluted city in the world in 1992. This was partly due to Mexico City's high altitude (7382 ft above sea level) and pollution getting trapped by the surrounding mountains. Carbon-based fuels also do not combust completely. Other factors include the proliferation of vehicles, rapid industrial growth, and the population boom. The Mexican government has several active plans to reduce emission levels which require citizen participation, vehicular restrictions, increase of green areas, and expanded bicycle accessibility.

Air pollution causes about one in seventeen (5.9%) of all deaths in the country (2014). It is the eighth-largest cause of death, after factors such as diet, overweight, high blood pressure, alcohol and drugs, smoking and lack of exercise.

The air pollution of the Mexico City Metropolitan Area, contained within the Valley of Mexico, is measured by the Índice Metropolitano de la Calidad del Aire (Metropolitan Index of Air Quality).

== History ==
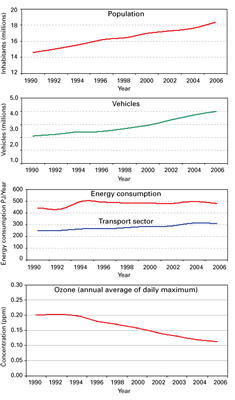
Trends in population, vehicular fleet, energy consumption and ozone concentration in the Mexico City Metropolitan Area (1990–2006)

In 1992, the United Nations named Mexico City "the most polluted city on the planet" and "the most dangerous city for children" six years later. From 1950 to 2015, the population in Mexico City increased from three million to twenty million. This population boom occurred mainly because of migrants that were looking for better opportunities, and as a consequence, the industrialization era began. This industrial growth was responsible for emitting over 11,000 tons of waste material into the atmosphere every day. As a result, the economy boomed as did the proliferation of vehicles. In 1980, there were 124 cars and light-duty trucks per 1000 residents. By 2010, there were 267. Population growth, increasing motorization and industrial activities, a constrained basin and intense solar radiation combined to cause intense air-quality problems of both primary and secondary pollutants. The automatic air-quality monitoring network, established in the late 1980s, revealed high concentrations of all criteria pollutants: lead, carbon monoxide, nitrogen dioxide, sulfur dioxide, ozone and particulate matter (PM). Ozone exceeded the air quality standards more than 90 percent of days and peaked above 300 parts per billion (about three times the standard) 40–50 days a year, among the worst in the world.

In 1990 the Mexican government decided to implement some air quality management programs to reduce emissions. Some of the programs included removal of lead from gasoline and the implementation of catalytic converters in automobiles, reduction of sulfur content in diesel transportation fuel, substitution of fuel oil in industry and power plants with natural gas, reformulation of liquified petroleum gas used for heating and cooking.

In 1993 the government mandated the replacement of lead-octane additives with MTBE and PEMEX, the state-run petroleum company, replacing underground storage tanks at all of its petrol stations.

In 2012 ozone and other air pollutants ranked at about the same level as Los Angeles. This improvement in air quality was achieved through the Mexican government's requirement that gasoline be reformulated, that polluting factories be closed or moved, and that drivers be prohibited from using their car one day per week. More recently there has been an expansion of public transport. Air pollution has been a major issue in Mexico City for decades.

Alongside a doubling of the vehicle fleet in Mexico City from 1992 to 2012, and the slow implementation of low-sulfur standards, the use of fuel ethers contributed greatly to an 86% decrease in CO, a 53% decrease in ozone, and a 32% decrease in particulate matter in that 20-year span.

== Air pollutants ==
- Ozone: Ozone can affect people's health by creating a sore throat, increase breathing difficulty, damage airways, and worsening lung diseases such as asthma or chronic bronchitis.
- Carbon monoxide: Carbon monoxide is a gas that is mostly emitted by vehicles. Inhaling carbon monoxide can cause heart and brain damage, even leading to death.
- Sulfur dioxide: Sulfur dioxide is produced by combustion of fossil fuels.Inhaling sulfur dioxide may cause health problems for people with diseases in the lung, making it more difficult for people with asthma to breathe and even leading to death if exposed longer.
- Particulates: There are two types of particles, Coarse Particles and ultrafine particles. Coarse particles (PM10) can decrease respiratory functionality. Ultrafine Particles (PM2.5), tend to penetrate into the gas exchange regions of the lung (alveolus), and very small particles may pass through the lungs to affect other organs.

== Effects of air pollution on human health ==
Air pollution causes millions of deaths around the world, as it affects people's health by causing diseases. Individuals who are most at risk of these effects are children, people with previous respiratory diseases, and senior citizens. Around 15% of global child deaths are caused to air pollution (2024). Air pollution has the following effects on human health.
- Ischemic heart disease: problems in the heart caused by a lack of blood due to obstructed vessels.
- Chronic obstructive pulmonary disease: respiratory disease that diminishes airflow and generates thick mucus in the lungs (sputum)
- Breast cancer: uncontrolled growth of malignant cells in the breast. Places with more air pollution showed an 8% increase of breast cancer appearing.
- Lung cancer: uncontrolled growth of malignant cells in the lungs.
- Pneumonia: infection in the lungs caused by problems in the alveoli.
- Cataract (provoked by household air pollution): dull section in the lens of the eye that impairs vision.
- Dementia: dementia is the loss of intellectual abilities in a human being (such as memory loss). Locations with higher air pollution make people with dementia lose their intellectual abilities at a higher pace.
- Fertility: fertility is an organism's (in this case human) ability to reproduce. Air pollution can decrease semen quality, fertility, and create reproductive problems.
Over the years, Mexico City's air pollution has negatively affected the population of the city. From 1995 to 2015, the lower quality of air has affected 24 million people living in the Metropolitan Area of the city. Also, PM 2.5 levels cause around 6,700 premature deaths each year in Mexico City. Additionally, early stages of Alzheimer have been found in young children.

== Mexico City's air quality index ==
In April–May 2016, ozone and suspended matter pollution in Mexico City reached levels that were detrimental to health, though the criteria to signal a pollution alert was lower in 2016 than in the 1980s. The city's population continues to grow and spread out, increasing automobiles usage in the city each year.

Mexico City previously used IMECA (Índice Metropolitano de la Calidad del Aire / Metropolitan Index of Air Quality), but transitioned to IAIS in 2020. IAIS (Índice Aire y Salud / Air and Health Index) is the tool used to measure air quality in Mexico City. A total of 34 monitors, located all around Mexico City measure the levels for the 6 main pollutants that are found in the atmosphere of the city. The measured pollutants are: O3, PM10, PM2.5, CO, NO2, SO2.

Indicators for each pollutant allow to assess the air quality with respect to specific pollution events. Indicators of the maximum hourly concentrations or for every 8 hours are used to evaluate the quality of the air based on health protection standards.

=== Five main categories for the quality of air based on IAIS ===
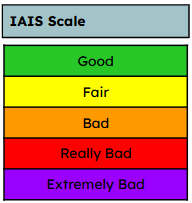
Air quality summary table. Shows different degrees of air quality from best (top) to worst (bottom) based on IAIS. Each color represents the degree of quality of air pollution, which is described in the text in this section.

- Good — Air quality is good and can enjoy outdoor activities. It can be identified with the color green.
- Fair — It has a moderate level of risk; people can do outdoor activities but can affect people with cardiac or lung diseases, as well as elderly people. It can be identified with the color yellow.
- Bad — It has a high level of risk; people should reduce vigorous outdoor activities. People become more prone to respiratory problems (children, elderly people, and may lead people with respiratory and lung diseases to a premature death. It can be identified with the color orange.
- Really bad — Associated with a really high level of risk; healthy people will start to show symptoms of a lower lung capacity. Higher risk of premature death for people with cardiac or lung diseases, as well as worsening symptoms for children and elderly people. It can be identified with the color red.
- Extremely Bad— Associated with an extremely high level of risk. Increase of severe respiratory symptoms for the general population. Serious negative effects for people of risk (children, elderly people, and people who suffer from cardiac or lung diseases). Higher risks of premature death for people who suffer from lung and cardiac diseases. It can be identified with the color purple.

=== Concentration of pollutants during the last decade ===
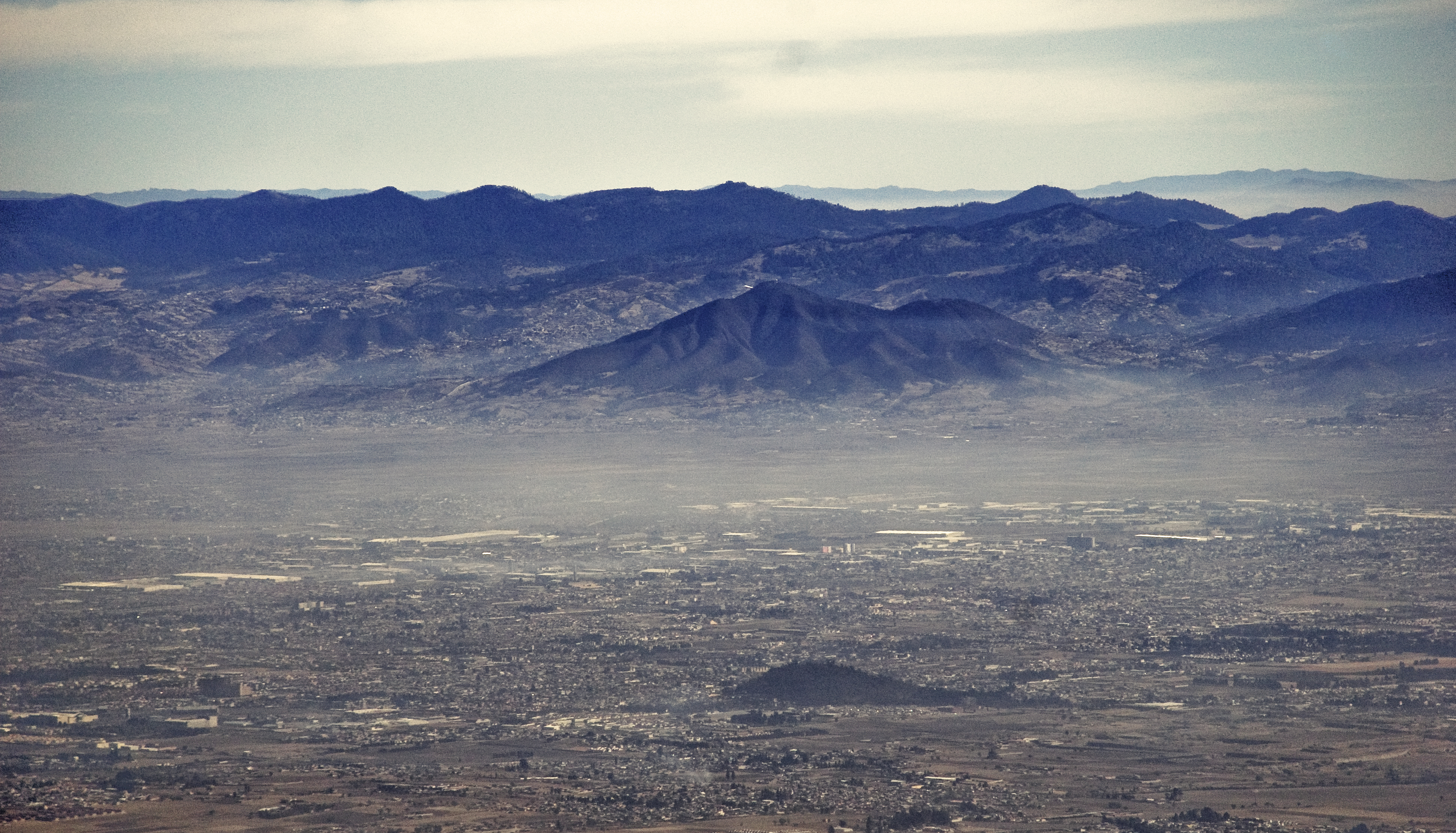
Mexico and its Air Pollution

PM10: According to the NOM, the annual limit for PM10 was 50 μg/m3 before 2014 and 40 μg/m3 from 2015 to present day. In Mexico City, the annual concentration of PM10 has been above the limit for the last 10 years. The highest concentration occurred in November 2019, when the PM10 levels were found to be over 110 μg/m3. Failure to comply with this NOM indicates that it is necessary to carry out actions to reduce the concentration of particulate material in the ambient air, given that it is not observed that there is a tendency to decrease in the concentrations registered for this pollutant criterion in recent years.

PM2.5: The values have exceeded the regulated limits (15 μg / m3 before and during 2014 and 12 μg/m3 as of 2015 ) since 2011. In May 2019, the level of PM2.5 reached levels between 150 and 160 μg / m3. This concentrations were reached due to burning of organic matter such as forest fires, firewood, fuel burning, especially diesel and some industrial processes. This concentrations amounts to the equivalent of Mexico City's inhabitants (of all ages) smoking nearly three-and-a-half cigarettes those days.

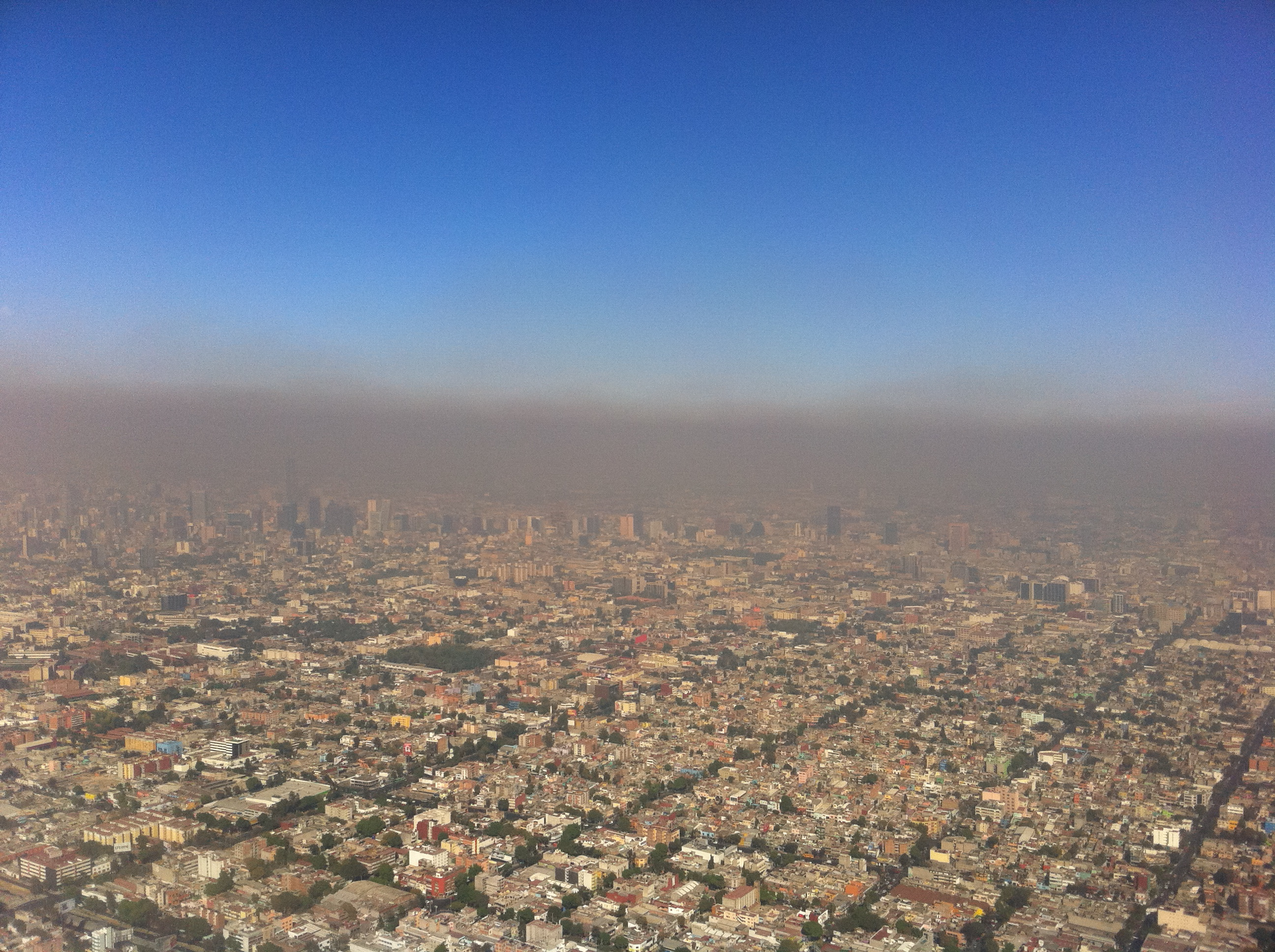
Smog Mexico City

Ozone (O3): The limits for ozone according to the NOM were 0.11 parts per million before 2014 and 0.095 ppm from 2015 to present times. Over the past two decades, ozone levels gradually fell below government limits as authorities moved factories out of the capital and tightened regulations on fuel and cars. In 2015, 37% of the total days showed poor air quality due to O3, 2016 brought a small improvement to 35% of the days. And again in 2017, 35% of the days were recorded as "bad" due to O3 levels. At times during the past two years, ozone concentration levels in the city reached such extreme levels that officials issued environmental risk alerts, urging people to stay indoors.

Sulfur dioxide (SO2): The NOM has three different limits to be met for concentrations of SO2: 8 hours (moving average), 24 hours (daily average) and annual average of the hourly data. During the last 10 years, concentrations below the three limits were recorded. However, in all stations the concentrations of this pollutant as a daily average are above the guideline value recommended by the World Health Organization, which is 0.008 ppm. From 2015 to 2017, the % of days with regular amounts of SO2 are minimal (above 5%).

Nitrogen dioxide (NO2): The NOM defines that the maximum allowable limit is 0.210 ppm as an hourly average. To comply with the standard, the established limit must not be exceeded more than once a year. In all monitoring stations in Mexico City where this NOM was evaluated, concentrations below the limit were recorded during 2015 to 2017. However, this NOM has not been updated since 1993 and the World Health Organization recommends as a guide that the limit of the hourly average for NO2: be set to 0.106 ppm. Regarding the distribution of air quality by NO2, monitoring stations dominated the days with good air quality in Mexico City between 2015 and 2017. In each of the years more than 90% of the days presented good air quality.

Carbon monoxide (CO): NOM establishes that the maximum permissible limit for CO is 11 ppm as a moving average of 8 hours. To comply with the standard, the established limit must not be exceeded more than once a year. Since 2011, the limit established in the NOM for CO in stations located within Mexico City has not been exceeded. Good air quality due to carbon monoxide predominate in all monitoring stations where it was possible to evaluate this pollutant.

==== Environmental contingency ====
On 16 May 2019, the government of Mexico City declared an extraordinary atmospheric environmental contingency, which indicates that the level of harmful particles in the air has exceeded the accepted standards (160 ppm for PM2.5). After a few hours, the same government would announce another "environmental contingency" for ozone, so it would be necessary to reduce the number of vehicles circulating in the city. Mexican President Claudia Sheinbaum commented that the main cause behind the current levels of pollution were a series of fires that have affected regions near the capital since the weekend. Schools were closed for two days and it was recommended by the authorities that citizens stayed home until the levels decreased.

"The Government knows that these particles generate problems in those with lung diseases, those who suffer from allergies, rhinitis, conjunctivitis and also for those who do not have regular discomfort: irritation of eyes or runny nose, because the body defends itself from these toxic elements," explains Carlos Falcón, an expert in environmental toxicology and respiratory damage.

"They are not taking it seriously enough, they have simply kept things as they go and we do not see a substantial advance in all the measures that have been proposed to improve air quality," says the Science Center of the Atmosphere researcher Ricardo Torres. "We did know that this could happen. There are bad conditions of dispersion of pollutants, but also a slow response from the authorities: during this weekend and until this Tuesday we had problems of atmospheric turbidity and according to what we have calculated, in one week we passed the World Health Organization standard 150 times," adds Torres.

== Awareness ==
One strategy to reduce health effects associated with poor air quality is to enhance public awareness and education of air quality and monitoring tools. In 2005, a survey was administered by members of the BMC Public Health with the purpose of finding out the levels of awareness from the general population in Mexico City about air pollution and its consequences. This study consisted of randomly selecting 800 individuals from Mexico City using a polling company named Parametria and asking them some Spanish-translated versions of the United States 2005 Behavioral Risk Factor Surveillance System.

The survey consisted of 17 questions about demography, geographic, lifestyle and general knowledge about Air Pollution.

The response rate of the survey was 21%, which compares favorably to the average response rate of phone-based surveys administered in the United States. The demographic information recorded by respondents in terms of gender and age distribution mirrors that of publicly available Mexico City census data. Beyond participant demographic information, it was found that 15.5% of respondents either had a respiratory illness or a family member with a respiratory illness living in their household. This was determined through a question asking if a responder, or anyone in their home, had been diagnosed with a respiratory illness such as asthma.

Results indicate that respondents with a respiratory illness themselves or in the home, compared to those who did not, were 14% more likely to be aware of the IMECA index. Respondents with a respiratory illness in the home were more likely to have had a healthcare provider discuss the Air quality index with them. Following the assessment of air quality index awareness, analyses considered whether those who knew of this resource modified their behavior to reduce exposure to air pollution. To gauge this application of IMECA knowledge among respondents, the number of days modified, defined as avoiding exercise or strenuous activity outdoors in response to poor air quality over a 12-month period, was assessed.

Perceived air pollution behavior modification was further separated by air quality index awareness status. It was found that 23.8% of respondents modified their behavior based on perceived poor air quality and were familiar with the index, and only 11.2% of respondents modified their behavior and were unfamiliar with this tool. Finally, 26.2% of respondents modified their behavior in response to an air quality report at least once over the course of 1 year.

== Plan of action ==
In efforts to reduce the pollution, in 1989 the Mexican government introduced "No-Drive Days", or Hoy No Circula, which prohibited drivers using their vehicles on one weekday per week, and in 2008 this was changed to include Saturdays. There is also large promotions for alternatives for driving, such as bus rapid transit lines and bike-sharing systems.

To address the city's pollution levels, the city's administration and the Metropolitan Environmental Commission (MEC) have mutually implemented two successive programs: the Comprehensive Programme Against Air Pollution (PICCA), which was launched in 1990, and ProAire, launched in 1995. The purpose of each was to improve the air quality of the metropolitan area of the Valle de México (the Metropolitan Area of Mexico City).

ProAire is now ProAire IV, which addresses eight themes:

- Reduction of energy consumption The first strategy has the purpose of creating a permanent program of ecosystem analysis of Mexico City, as well as the creation of urban sub-centers in the basins of those Metro stations that currently have idle capacity. Another case is the consideration of criteria that minimize the energy consumption of the physical space cycle of solid waste in the city.
- Cleaner and more efficient energy across all sectors This proposal has the purpose of creating a permanent program of ecosystem analysis of Mexico City, as well as the creation of urban sub-centers in the basins of those Metro stations that currently have idle capacity. Another case is the consideration of criteria that minimize the energy consumption of the physical space cycle of solid waste in the city.
- Promoting public transport and regulating fuel consumption. In addition to the requirement increase the supply of medium and high capacity public transport, it is necessary to improve the overall efficiency of the transportation systems operating in Mexico city. It is not enough to improve mobility, it is necessary to improve it by increasing the energy efficiency of motor vehicles and promoting non-polluting means of transport.
- Technology shift and controlling emissions. These include, among other aspects, covering the lags in the applicable regulations to reduce toxic emissions from organic solvents; to reduce emissions of mercury, dioxins and furans; the strengthening of technical capacities of personnel and equipment in the inspection and surveillance activities to improve compliance with the corresponding environmental legislation; to implement adequate schemes that promote and encourage environmental self-regulation in the industry; to regulate, from the environmental point of view, the limits of emissions of gases and particles of water heaters, process and boilers that are not considered in the current regulations and to establish a continuous and real-time monitoring system in the electric power generating plants, among many other measures.
- Environmental education and creation of sustainable culture and citizen participation. The strategy includes the design and development of a metropolitan incentive program for public and private companies to make incremental use of space work and temporarily distributed. Promoting the simplification of procedures in government agencies and private companies, which includes the elimination of the requirement of physical presence and promotion of the intensive use of new telecommunications technologies. And promoting environmental education in the national education system.
- Green areas and reforestation. The city of Mexico is still far from the internationally recommended ratio between green areas and urbanized areas, which contributes not only to the impoverishment of the quality of the urban environment and therefore to the quality of life, but to the proliferation of islands of heat and the resuspension of particles. The strategy promotes actions such as recovery, restoration, conservation and expansion of urban green areas to mitigate particle resuspension. Review and modernization of forest fire prevention and combat programs. And update and modernization of reforestation programs.
- Institutional capacity building and scientific research. The Metropolitan Environmental Commission has historically concentrated its actions on air quality management. However, expanding the search for more solutions to the problem of air pollution requires progress in the implementation of a metropolitan environmental sustainability agenda, incorporating the ecosystem vision proposed in this plan of action as a whole.

In 2023, Mexico City joined the Breathe Cities Initiative to share air quality data, reduce carbon emissions, and share potential solutions regarding air quality. Mexico City was the third city to join Breathe Cities, with 14 cities in total. These cities are the following: Accra, Ghana; Bogotá, Colombia; Bangkok, Thailand; Brussels, Belgium; Jakarta, Indonesia; Johannesburg, South Africa; London, England; Milan, Italy; Nairobi, Kenya; Paris, France; Rio de Janeiro, Brazil; Sofia, Bulgaria; and Warsaw, Poland.

== See also ==
- Air quality index
- IMECA—Índice Metropolitano de la Calidad del Aire
- Greater Mexico City topics
