= List of Mexican states by Human Development Index =

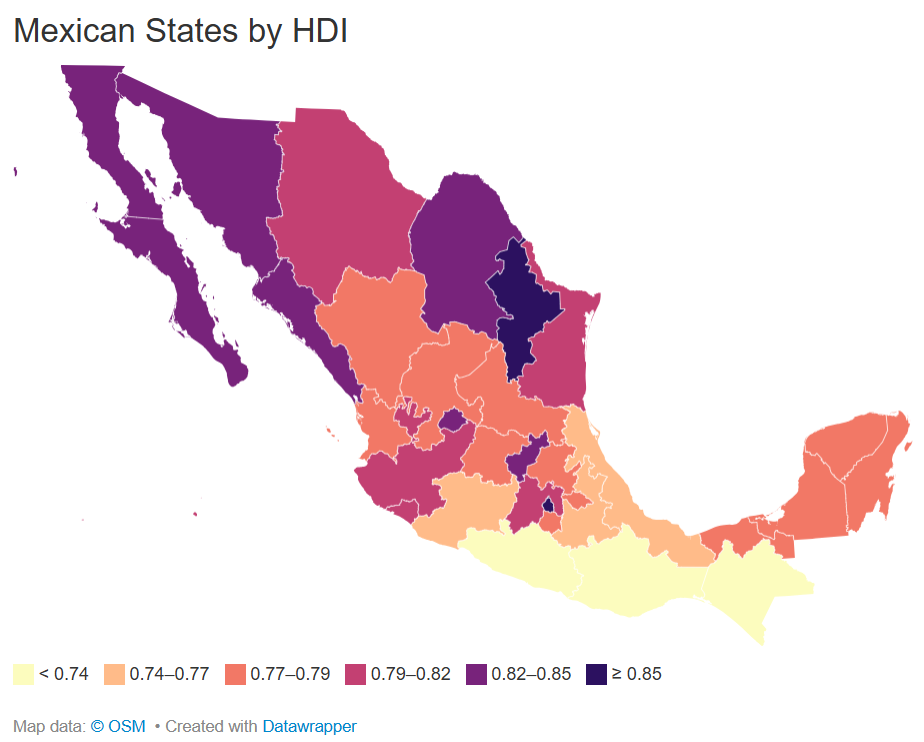
Map of the Mexican states by Human Development Index in 2023.

The following table presents a listing of Mexico's 32 federal states, ranked in order of their Human Development Index, as reported by the United Nations Development Programme with data from 1990 to 2017.

As of 2023, thirteen states plus Mexico City are classified as having "very high human development." The remaining states, are labeled as having "high human development."

== Mexican States ==
Rank	Federal Entity	HDI (2023)
Very high human development
1	Mexico City	0.876
2	Nuevo León	0.857
3	Coahuila	0.833
4	Baja California Sur	0.831
5	Baja California	0.830
6	Querétaro	0.829
7	Sonora	0.828
8	Sinaloa	0.828
9	Aguascalientes	0.825
10	Chihuahua	0.817
11	Tamaulipas	0.807
12	Jalisco	0.805
13	Colima	0.805
14	State of Mexico	0.802
High human development
15	Quintana Roo	0.790
16	Nayarit	0.789
–	Mexico (average)	0.789
17	Morelos	0.788
18	Tabasco	0.784
19	Yucatán	0.784
20	San Luis Potosí	0.782
21	Tlaxcala	0.782
22	Hidalgo	0.782
23	Durango	0.781
24	Campeche	0.780
25	Zacatecas	0.777
26	Guanajuato	0.769
27	Michoacán	0.758
28	Veracruz	0.757
29	Puebla	0.755
30	Guerrero	0.727
31	Oaxaca	0.723
32	Chiapas	0.710

== See also ==
- List of Mexican states by poverty rate
- List of Mexican states by unemployment
