= GPGP =

GPGP may refer to:

- Great Pacific Garbage Patch, or Pacific Trash Vortex, a rotating ocean current containing marine litter
- Generalized Partial Global Planning (computer science), see Task analysis environment modeling simulation (TAEMS)
- General-purpose computing on graphics processing units
- GpGp (software), see Comparison of Gaussian process software
- Glucosyl-3-phosphoglycerate phosphatase (GpgP), an enzyme
- Government by the People Green Party (GPGP), former name of the Green Party of South Africa

== See also ==
- GPG (disambiguation)
- PGP (disambiguation)
- GP (disambiguation)
- GP2 (disambiguation)
