= List of ASEAN countries by HDI =

The following is the list of ASEAN countries by the Human Development Index as well as when it's adjusted by inequality. As of the latest report, Singapore has the highest HDI in ASEAN and Asia in general at 0.946, and Cambodia has the lowest HDI in ASEAN at 0.606. The inequality-adjusted report also has Singapore at the top with 0.825, and Cambodia having the lowest with 0.438.

== Standard HDI ==
=== List ===
HDI 2023 data (2025 report) rankings
Rank	Country	HDI
Members
Very high human development
1	Singapore	0.946
2	Brunei	0.837
3	Malaysia	0.819
High human development
4	Thailand	0.798
5	Vietnam	0.766
―	World (average)	0.756
―	ASEAN (average)	0.745
6	Indonesia	0.728
7	Philippines	0.720
Medium human development
8	East Timor	0.634
9	Laos	0.617
10	Myanmar	0.609
11	Cambodia	0.606
Observers
Medium human development
—	Papua New Guinea	0.576

=== Map ===
This map shows the countries by their Human Development Index, The color indicators are as follows:

Very High Human Development High Human Development Medium Human Development

== Inequality-adjusted HDI ==
=== List ===
IHDI 2023 data (2025 report) rankings
Rank	Country	IHDI
Members
Very high human development
1	Singapore	0.823
High human development
2	Brunei	0.756
3	Malaysia	0.707
Medium human development
4	Thailand	0.677
5	Vietnam	0.641
―	ASEAN (average)	0.619
6	Indonesia	0.608
7	Philippines	0.597
―	World (average)	0.590
Low human development
8	Myanmar	0.477
9	Laos	0.462
10	East Timor	0.451
11	Cambodia	0.444
Observers
Low human development
—	Papua New Guinea	0.423

=== Map ===
This map shows the countries by their inequality-adjusted Human Development Index, The color indicators are as follows:

Very High Human Development High Human Development Medium Human Development Low Human Development

== Planetary-pressures-adjusted HDI ==
=== List ===
PHDI 2023 data (2025 report) rankings
Rank	Country	PHDI
Members
High human development
1	Thailand	0.726
Medium human development
2	Vietnam	0.699
3	Indonesia	0.684
4	Philippines	0.680
―	World (average)	0.680
5	Malaysia	0.677
―	ASEAN (average)	0.642
6	Singapore	0.618
7	Brunei	0.600
8	Myanmar	0.593
9	Cambodia	0.572
10	Laos	0.570
No data
11	East Timor	N/A
Observers
Medium human development
—	Papua New Guinea	0.566

=== Map ===
This map shows the countries by their planetary-pressures-adjusted Human Development Index, The color indicators are as follows:

High Human Development Medium Human Development No Data

== See also ==
- List of ASEAN country subdivisions by GDP
- List of ASEAN countries by GDP
