= G2P =

G2P may refer to:

- Glycerol 2-phosphate
- Genomes2People
- GEN2PHEN
- Grapheme-to-phoneme (g2p) models, build using training material like CMU Pronouncing Dictionary

== See also ==
- GP2 (disambiguation)
- 2PG
