= GPP =

GPP may refer to:

== Places ==
- Grosse Pointe Park, Michigan, United States

== Politics ==
- Gambian People's Party, Gambia
- German People's Party, a political party in Germany dissolved in 1933
- German People's Party (1868), a political party in Germany from 1868 to 1910
- German People's Party (Austria), a former political party in Austria
- German People's Party (Romania), a former political party in Romania
- Great Patriotic Pole, a Venezuelan political alliance
- Goa Praja Party, Goa, India
- Gujarat Parivartan Party, Gujarat, India

== Science and technology ==
=== Biology and medicine ===
- General physical preparedness
- Generalized pustular psoriasis
- Gross Primary Productivity
- Gpp protein, which converts pppGpp to ppGpp during the stringent response

=== Chemistry ===
- Geranyl pyrophosphate

=== Computing and telecommunications ===
- 3GPP, a collaboration between telecommunications associations
- GeForce Partner Program
- General purpose preprocessor
- Genuine People Personalities (Douglas Adams' Marvin the Paranoid Android)
- Google Play Protect

=== Economics ===
- Gross Private Product, a means of national income accounting
- Gross Provincial Product, a means of measuring national income in Thailand

== Transport ==
- Gradski prijevoz putnika, a bus and tram company in Osijek

== Other uses ==
- Green public procurement
- Global Poverty Project
- Government Polytechnic, Panaji, India
