= GP2 =

GP2, GP.2, GP-2 or variant, may refer to:

- British GP2, a motorcycle race classification within the British Supersport Championship
- GP2 Series, an open wheel motor racing series that was succeeded by the FIA Formula 2 Championship
  - GP2 Asia Series, a similar series that ran in Asia from 2008 to 2011, before merging with the main GP2 Series
- GP2 (gene), a human gene
- Grand Prix 2, a racing simulator game
- Asiago GP.2, glider
- González Gil-Pazó GP-2, airplane
- Gary Payton II, American basketball player

== See also ==
- Moto2, motorcycle GP class 2
- GPGP (disambiguation)
- GPP (disambiguation)
- GP (disambiguation)
