= PPR =

PPR may refer to:

== Politics and government ==
- Partido Popular Republicano, a political party in El Salvador
- Partido Progressista Reformador, a Brazilian party (1993–1995)
- Pirate Party of Russia (founded 2009)
- Policía de Puerto Rico, the Spanish abbreviation for the Puerto Rico Police
- Polish People's Republic, a Warsaw Pact member state (1947–1989)
- Politieke Partij Radicalen, a Dutch party (1968–1990)
- Polska Partia Robotnicza, the Polish Workers' Party (1942–1948)
- Puerto Ricans for Puerto Rico Party (Spanish: Partido Puertorriqueños por Puerto Rico; founded 2003)
- Romanian Popular Party, a Moldovan political party (founded 2013)

== Science, technology and mathematics ==
- Pentatricopeptide repeat, a sequence motif in genetics
- Peste des petits ruminants, or ovine rinderpest, a disease mainly of sheep and goats
- Polypropylene random copolymer, a plastic used for potable water pipework
- Portland Pattern Repository, a web repository for computer programming design patterns
- Projection Pursuit Regression, a statistical learning method
- Pulsed Plasma Rocket, a form of nuclear pulse propulsion, a pure-fission variant of PuFF under development by Howe Industries for NASA

== Other uses ==
- PPR (company), a French luxury-brands and retail conglomerate
- Philosophy and Phenomenological Research, a bimonthly academic journal
- Points per reception, a scoring system for fantasy American football
- Private product remaining, a macroeconomic indicator
- Proper, in heraldry; see Tincture (heraldry) § Proper
- Prior Permission Required, permission to land at an airport; see List of aviation, avionics, aerospace and aeronautical abbreviations § P
- Post-punk revival, an indie rock subgenre
- Projek Perumahan Rakyat; high-density, low-cost apartments built by the government of Malaysia for the lower-income (B40) group
