= Mutalyzer =

Mutalyzer is a web-based software tool which was primarily developed to check the description of sequence variants identified in a gene during genetic testing. Mutalyzer applies the rules of the standard human sequence variant nomenclature and can correct descriptions accordingly. Apart from the sequence variant description, Mutalyzer requires a DNA sequence record containing the transcript and protein feature annotation as a reference. Mutalyzer 2 accepts GenBank and Locus Reference Genomic (LRG) records. The annotation is also used to apply the correct codon translation tables and generate DNA and protein variant descriptions for any organism. The Mutalyzer server supports programmatic access via a SOAP Web service described in the Web Services Description Language (WSDL) and an HTTP/RPC+JSON web service.

== Background ==
Genetic testing is generally performed in families with hereditary disease. Any sequence variant identified in a gene can be described in test reports using the position of the change and the nucleotide or amino acid involved. With this simple rule, a deletion of the nucleotide guanine (G) in a stretch of 4 G nucleotides might be described in 4 different ways, when each of the G positions is used. Although different descriptions do not affect the functional consequences of the change, they may obfuscate the fact that two persons share the same variant or the real frequency of a variant in the population. The standard human sequence variant nomenclature proposed by the Human Genome Variation Society was developed to solve this problem. Proper variant descriptions are expected to facilitate searches for more information about the functional consequences in the literature and in gene variant or locus-specific databases (LSDBs).

Mutalyzer is used by the Leiden Open Variation Database (LOVD), which stores sequence variant information for many human genes, to check variant descriptions before submission of new data. This helps data sharing, display and integration with other genetic resources (e.g., Ensembl, UCSC Genome Browser, NCBI sequence viewer)
