= Economy of Isan =

Economy of the region of northeastern Thailand

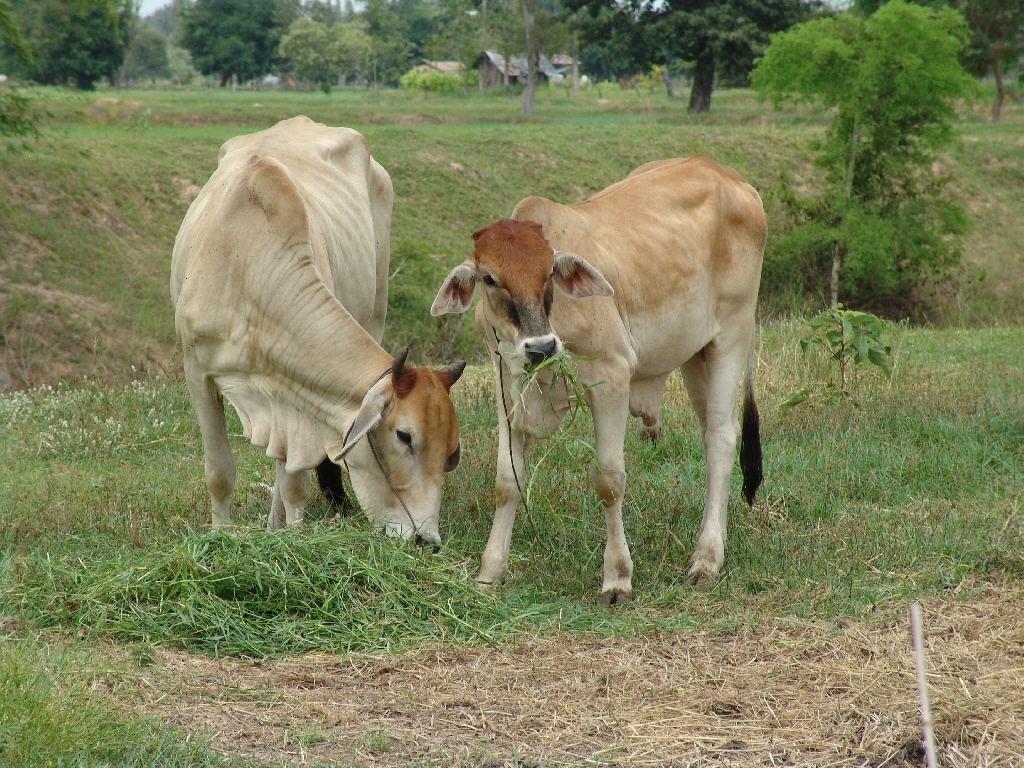
Cattle in Isan

The economy of Isan, Thailand's largest region, composed of 20 provinces in the northeast, is dominated by agriculture, although agricultural output is low and decreasing in importance while the trade and service sectors are growing. Much of the population is poor and badly educated. Many labourers have been driven by poverty to seek work in other parts of Thailand or abroad.

Isan accounts for around a third of Thailand's population and a third of its area. In 2013 it contributed 10.9 percent of the kingdom's GDP. The gross regional product (GRP) per capita in 2013 was 74,532 baht per year, the lowest of all Thai regions, 5.8 times lower than that of the leading eastern region.

World Bank report that after the 1997 Asian financial crisis Income in the northeast, the poorest part of Thailand, has risen by 46 percent from 1998 to 2001 due to Education For All. Nationwide poverty fell from 21.3 to 11.3 percent.

== Politically-driven upturn ==
The first decade of the 21st century saw improvements in Isan's economy. Economic growth in the region reached 40 percent from 2007 to 2011, versus 23 percent for the country as a whole, and just 17 percent for greater Bangkok. Monthly household income rose 40 percent between 2007 and 2011, the biggest jump of any Thai region.

Former prime minister Thaksin Shinawatra came to power in 2001 and initiated a series of populist policies—-from virtually free healthcare to low-interest loans to the rural poor—that stimulated Isan's economy. Thaksin was ousted in a 2006 coup, but his sister, Yingluck was elected prime minister in 2011. The economic renaissance of Isan coincided with the expansionary policies, from wage increases to farm subsidies, that were begun by Thaksin and continued by his sister. Yingluck's government brought in a nationwide minimum wage of 300 baht a day in January 2013. In some Isan provinces, that was an increase of 35 percent, among the biggest gains in the country, on top of a nationwide 40 percent increase in April 2012. Yingluck was deposed in early-2014 and replaced by a military government in May.

The military government's economic initiatives of 2016 call for two trillion baht (US$57 billion) to be fast-tracked into nationwide infrastructure projects. Only 10 percent of the funds are allocated to projects in Isan despite its accounting for 33 percent of the population. The majority will be spent on a new Khorat-Bangkok motorway.

== Economy ==
Agriculture is the biggest sector of the economy. The following table shows the percentage of gross regional product (GRP) by sector in 2013:

Agriculture	27.1%
Trade	10.8
Manufacturing	17.2
Education	14.0
Other	30.9

For FY 2018, Northeastern Thailand Region had a combined economic output of 1,559 trillion baht (US$50.3 billion), or 9.5 percent of Thailand's GDP. Loei province had an economic output of 54.769 billion baht (US$1.77 billion). This equates to a GPP per capita value of 100,796 baht (US$3,251), almost double than for Nong Bua Lamphu province, lowest in the ranking.

Gross Provincial Product (GPP)
Rank	Province	GPP (million baht)	Population (x 1000)	GPP per capita (baht)
1	Loei	54,769	543	100,796
2	Nong Khai	42,359	456	92,825
3	Udon Thani	111,635	1,266	88,194
4	Nakhon Phanom	44,184	561	78,802
5	Kalasin	59,251	801	73,998
6	Bueng Kan	24,321	360	67,476
7	Sakon Nakhon	59,297	925	64,084
8	Mukdahan	25,363	404	62,766
9	Nong Bua Lamphu	29,053	478	60,776
	Upper provinces	450,232	5,794	77,707

Khon Kaen province had an economic output of 211.192 billion baht (US$6.8 billion). This equates to a GPP per capita value of 122,950 baht (US$3,966), nearly 66 percent more than for Maha Sarakham province, next in the rank-list and double then for Yasothon province, lowest in the ranking.

Gross Provincial Product (GPP)
Rank	Province	GPP (million baht)	Population (x 1000)	GPP per capita (baht)
1	Khon Kaen	211,192	1,718	122,950
2	Maha Sarakham	59,695	792	75,418
3	Roi Et	75,602	1,068	70,803
4	Chaiyaphum	65,653	942	69,730
5	Amnat Charoen	18,569	282	65,742
6	Yasothon	27,793	463	60,055
	Middle provinces	458,504	5,265	87,085

Nakhon Ratchasima province had an economic output of 295.511 billion baht (US$9.5 billion). This amounts to a per capita GPP value of 115,517 baht (US$3,726), 56 percent more than for Maha Sarakham province, next in the rank-list.

Gross Provincial Product (GPP)
Rank	Province	GPP (million baht)	Population (x 1000)	GPP per capita (baht)
1	Nakhon Ratchasima	295,511	2,515	115,517
2	Si Sa Ket	72,484	980	73,958
3	Ubon Ratchathani	124,217	1,738	71,469
4	Surin	75,891	1,076	70,556
5	Buri Ram	82,429	1,228	67,142
	Lower provinces	650,532	7,537	86,312

=== Agriculture ===
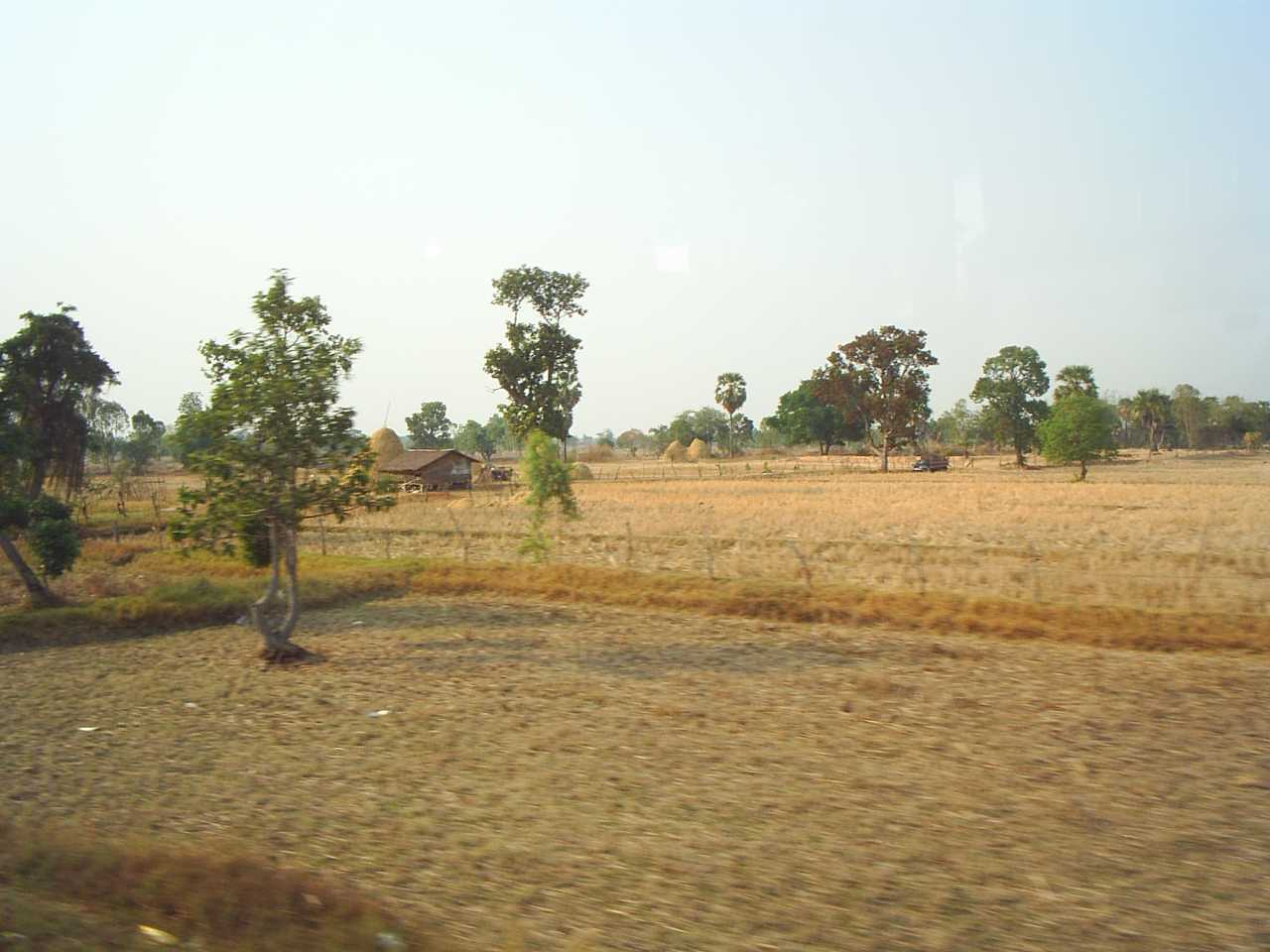
Isan suffers from drought during the dry season

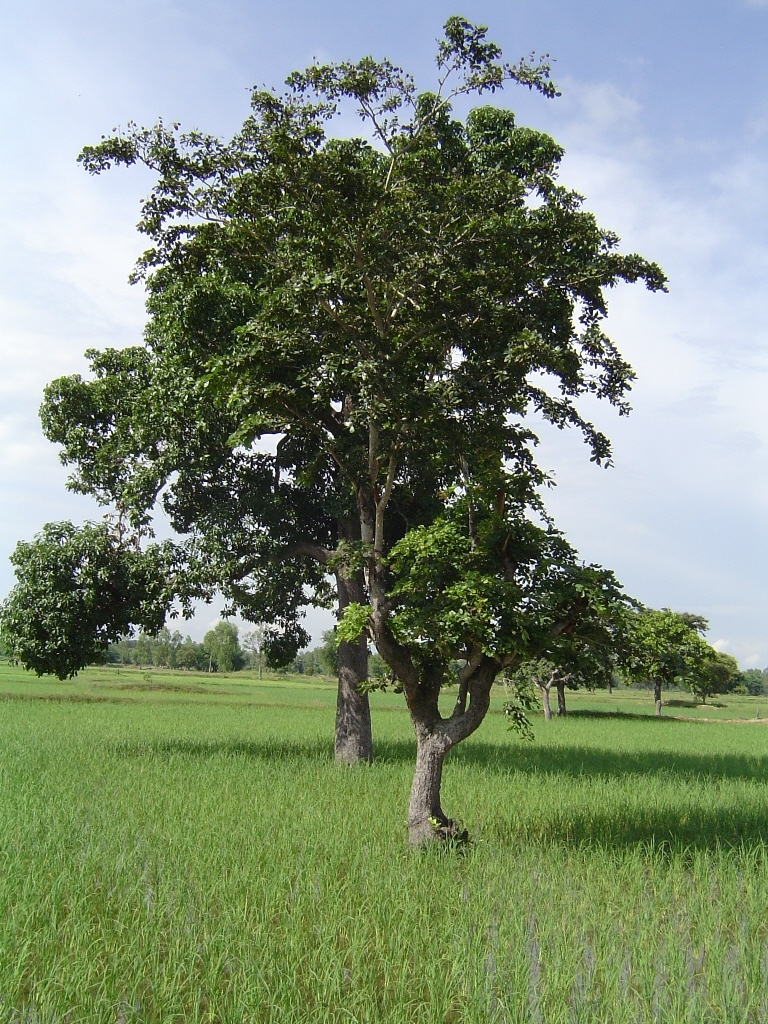
Growing rice in September

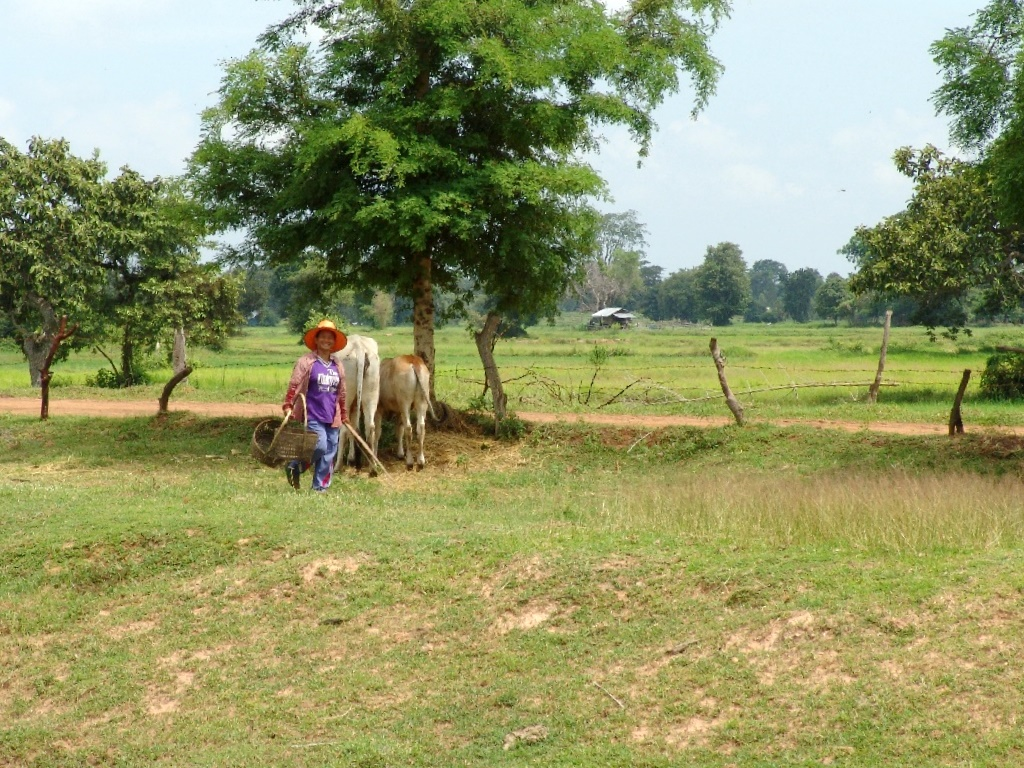
Farmer with cattle

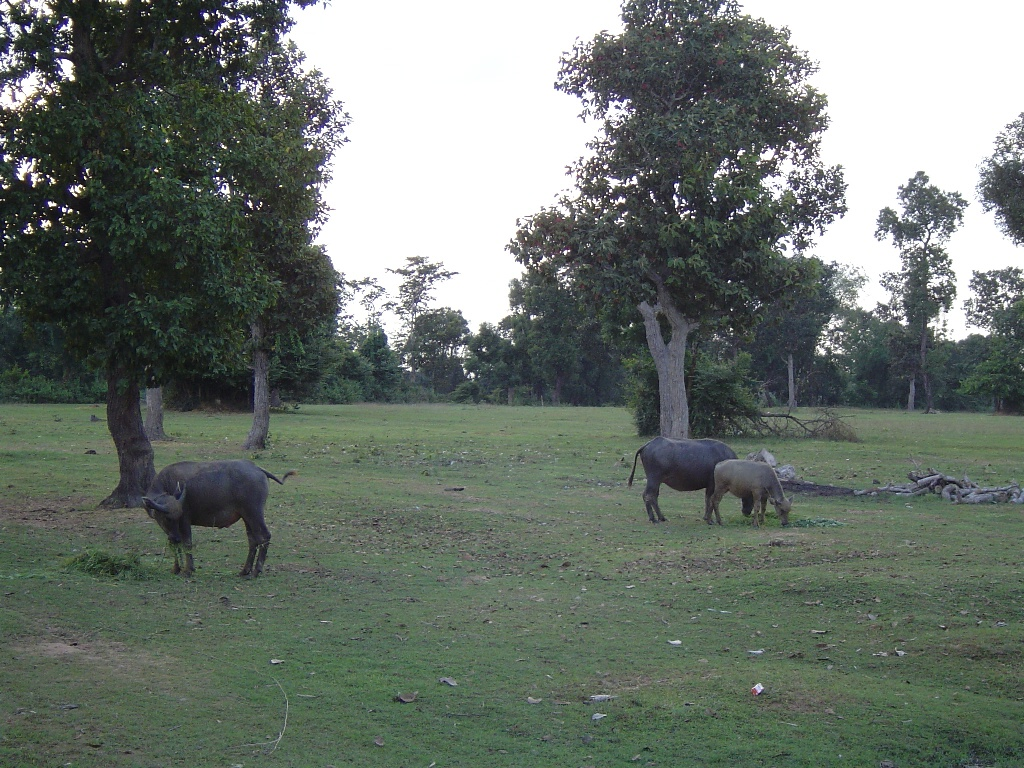
Domesticated water buffaloes

Agriculture remains the largest sector of the economy, but its importance is decreasing. Its share of GRP fell from 45 percent in 1980 to 33.2 percent in 1990, and to 27.1 percent in 2013. During the 1990s, the agricultural sector grew at 3.8 percent per annum, compared to 9.7 percent for the service sector. Although 76 percent of the population engages in some form of agriculture, only 46 percent of the workforce is formally employed in the sector, reflecting the fact that for many it is a part-time occupation.

Of the region's 155,400 km^{2}, only 92,204 km^{2} is cultivated, and only 7,770 km^{2} of that is irrigated. There are a number of reasons for this. Saline contamination makes a third of the land unfit for cultivation. Although average rainfall is not much less than in other parts of the country, its unpredictability often causes droughts or flooding. The latter is worsened by the generally flat terrain of the plateau, while both are exacerbated by the sandy soil, which is poor at retaining water. Deforestation reduced forest cover from 25 percent in 1975 to 14 percent in 1995, again inhibiting water retention.

Attempts to improve the agricultural sector through irrigation and diversification have caused unforeseen environmental damage. Increased irrigation has raised the water table in some areas, bringing salt to the surface and contaminating the soil. The same effect has also been observed following forest clearance and the planting of cereal crops, cassava, and sugar cane.

Irrigation has also proved somewhat ineffective in increasing agricultural production. Workers commonly work in agriculture during the wet season and turn to non-farm activities during the dry season. Using irrigation to increase dry season production would therefore reduce the labour devoted to these other activities and so reduce the income they provide, rather than supplementing it.

The cultivated land is relatively unproductive: paddy fields produce only 424 tonnes of rice per square mile, compared to 547 nationally. Most farmers can produce only one crop of rice a year. Many farmers still use water buffalo rather than tractors.

Sixty percent of cultivated land is devoted to rice paddies. The concentration on rice farming has made the farmers vulnerable to fluctuating prices. This has been reduced somewhat by increased diversification, but Isan still accounts for half of Thailand's exports of rice, cassava, and sugar. These crops employ 700,000 Isan families. Other crops include, tobacco, cotton, and watermelons.

=== Tourism ===
According to the governor of Nakhon Phanom Province, "The entire Northeast [Isan] gained only 2.9 percent of [the] country's tourism income of 2.7 trillion baht [in 2017]."

=== Other sectors ===
Other sectors of the economy have been growing more quickly than agriculture, although this growth can be misleading. The number of factories grew from 1,908 in 1975 to 44,000 in 1995, but 34,312 of these were rice mills. In 2000, 76 percent of Isan factories were breweries or food or tobacco processors.

A study conducted by Khon Kaen University estimated that each year 8.67 billion baht is sent by foreign husbands to their wives in Isan. The 2010 census found that 90 percent of the slightly more than 27,000 foreigners living in the northeastern region were married to women from there.

== Poverty ==
Isan's economic disadvantages have caused great poverty. Most of Thailand's rural poor live in Isan. In 1995, 28 percent of the population was classed as below the poverty line, compared to just seven percent in central Thailand. In 2000, per capita income was just 26,317 baht, compared to 208,434 in Bangkok. Even within Isan, there is a rural/urban divide.

In 1995, all of Thailand's ten poorest provinces were in Isan, the poorest being Sisaket Province. In 2012, six of Thailand's ten poorest provinces were in Isan, Kalasin being the poorest province in the region. From 2000 to 2012, half of Thailand's eight provinces with chronic poverty were in Isan. Most wealth and investment is concentrated in the four major cities of Khorat, Ubon, Udon, and Khon Kaen. These four provinces account for 40 percent of the region's population.

== Workforce ==
A survey in spring 2001 found a total labour force of 10.7 million. Almost 600,000 of those were seasonal labourers between work, and 5.2 percent were unemployed. The remaining 9.5 million were employed as follows:

Agriculture	4.4 million
Wholesale/retail trade	1.37 million
Manufacturing	1.2 million
Construction	820,000
Hotel/restaurant	440,000
Other	1.3 million

The population is poorly-educated, with 6.4 million over 15 not having completed primary school. Four million have a primary education, 2.2 million secondary, and 829,736 have a university level education (all as of 2001). There is little incentive for better education, as most job vacancies require few or no educational qualifications.

== Economic migrants ==
Many Isan people have sought work elsewhere. In the first half of the 1990s, 420,000 workers moved elsewhere in Thailand (60 percent of them to Bangkok). Many of the taxicab drivers, shop and factory workers and construction workers in the capital are from Isan. The economic advantages of migrant labour have come at a social cost. While some workers migrate annually, other families are divided, often for many years.

The Thai government's National Economic and Social Development Board estimates that remittances from Isan women overseas amount to US$35 million per year, equivalent to six percent of the region's economic output. Researchers estimate that at least 15,000 Isan women are married to foreign men.

Rural Isan is a disproportionate supplier of workers to the sex trade, both domestically and abroad. This is partly a legacy of Vietnam-era US bases, but mostly due to the region's poverty. As one researcher summed it up, "The equation looks like this: One working day in a tapioca field pays $8 (300 baht). One working day at a multinational chicken factory pays $11 (400 baht). One working day at a metal factory in Denmark pays $91 (3200 baht), and one busy working day at a Danish brothel pays $450 (15,800 baht)."

Sex workers from Isan see prostitution as a way out of poverty. One former sex worker from Maha Sarakham said she entered Bangkok's sex trade at the age of 19 and earned up to 5,000 baht (US$143.14) a night, nearly 20 times the minimum wage of 300 baht (US$8.59) per day. "No one wants to work in this business, but it's fast and easy money," she said.

== See also ==
- Economy of Thailand
- List of Thai provinces by GPP
