= List of regions of the Philippines by GDP =

This is a list of regions and highly urbanized cities of the Philippines by GDP and GDP per capita according to the data by the Philippine Statistics Authority.

Data for 2024 estimates (international US$ using 2024 PPP conversion factor from the International Monetary Fund).

== Regions by GDP ==
Rank	Region	2024 GDP (million PHP)	2024 GDP (million USD, nominal)	2024 GDP (million USD, PPP)	% of national GDP
1	National Capital Region	8,214,308	143,750	424,359	31.1
2	Calabarzon	3,723,569	65,162	192,363	14.1
3	Central Luzon	2,892,168	50,613	149,412	10.9
4	Central Visayas	1,491,366	26,099	77,045	5.6
5	Davao Region	1,376,651	24,091	71,119	5.2
6	Northern Mindanao	1,273,437	22,285	65,787	4.8
7	Ilocos Region	877,319	15,353	45,323	3.3
8	Negros Island Region	806,010	14,112	41,639	3.0
9	Western Visayas	797,041	13,948	41,176	3.0
10	Bicol Region	769,942	13,474	39,776	2.9
11	Soccsksargen	675,618	11,723	34,903	2.5
12	Eastern Visayas	621,905	10,883	32,128	2.4
13	Zamboanga Peninsula	582,571	10,195	30,096	2.2
14	Cagayan Valley	564,165	9,873	29,145	2.1
15	Mimaropa Region	509,501	8,916	26,321	1.9
16	Caraga	439,147	7,685	22,687	1.7
17	Cordillera Administrative Region	445,524	7,797	23,016	1.7
18	Bangsamoro	386,128	6,757	19,948	1.5
	Philippines	26,446,369	462,811	1,366,243	100

== Regions by GDP per capita ==
Rank	Region	2024 GDP per capita (PHP)	2024 GDP per capita (USD, nominal)	2024 GDP per capita (USD, PPP)	% of national average
1	National Capital Region	595,768	10,426	30,760	254.3
2	Davao Region	252,515	4,419	13,045	107.8
3	Northern Mindanao	244,359	4,276	12,624	104.3
4	Cordillera Administrative Region	236,844	4,145	12,236	101.1
5	Central Luzon	224,858	3,935	11,616	96.0
6	Central Visayas	219,111	3,834	11,319	93.5
7	Calabarzon	218,928	3,831	11,310	93.4
8	Negros Island Region	167,107	2,924	8,626	71.2
9	Western Visayas	164,440	2,878	8,495	70.2
10	Ilocos Region	164,160	2,873	8,481	70.1
11	Mimaropa Region	153,138	2,680	7,911	65.4
12	Caraga	150,290	2,630	7,764	64.2
13	Cagayan Valley	148,941	2,606	7,694	63.6
14	Soccsksargen	148,466	2,598	7,670	63.4
15	Zamboanga Peninsula	144,309	2,525	7,455	61.6
16	Eastern Visayas	133,164	2,330	6,879	56.8
17	Bicol Region	122,613	2,146	6,334	52.3
18	Bangsamoro	73,030	1,112	3,773	31.2
	Philippines	234,227	4,099	12,100	100

== Highly urbanized cities (HUCs) by GDP ==
Figures exclude cities in Metro Manila. GDP (Nominal) figures based on 2018 Philippine Constant Prices as published by the Philippine Statistics Office on their various public releases in 2023. GDP in PPP using 2018 Constant Prices not publicized. GDP in USD using 2023 Exchange Rates. % of GDP Regional not publicized for Central Visayas Cities.

Rank	HUC	2024 GDP (million PHP)	2024 GDP (million USD, nominal)	2024 GDP (million USD, PPP)	% of regional GDP
1	Davao City	574,720	9,900.43	NA	51.9% of Davao Region
2	Cebu City	334,480	5,761.93	NA	NA Central Visayas
3	Cagayan de Oro	295,570	5,095.65	NA	28% of Northern Mindanao
4	Baguio	178,850	3,080.96	NA	45.9% of Cordillera Administrative Region
5	Lapu-Lapu City	176,360	3,038.07	NA	NA Central Visayas
6	Iloilo City	171,570	2,955.56	NA	15.2% of Western Visayas
7	Bacolod	157,370	2,710.94	NA	NA Negros Island Region
8	Angeles City	151,470	2,609.30	NA	6.1% of Central Luzon
9	Zamboanga City	151,330	2,606.90	NA	32.6% of Zamboanga Peninsula
10	General Santos	141,190	2,432.21	NA	25.6% of Soccsksargen
11	Mandaue	126,080	2,171.92	NA	NA Central Visayas
12	Iligan	88,510	1,524.72	NA	8.2% of Northern Mindanao
13	Butuan	66,460	1,144.88	NA	17.7% of Caraga
14	Puerto Princesa	64,470	1,110.59	NA	13.5% of Mimaropa
15	Tacloban	59,580	1,026.36	NA	11.4% of Eastern Visayas
16	Olongapo	59,210	1,019.98	NA	2.4% of Central Luzon
17	Lucena	53,730	925.58	NA	1.6% of Calabarzon

== Highly urbanized cities (HUCs) by GDP per capita ==
Figures exclude cities in Metro Manila.

Rank	HUC	2023 GDP per capita (PHP, real)	2023 GDP per capita (PHP, nominal)	2023 GDP per capita (USD, real)	Region
1	Baguio	455,398.90	494,688.14	7,818.01	Cordillera Administrative Region
2	Cagayan de Oro	358,878.67	414,985.04	6,161.01	Northern Mindanao
3	Iloilo City	337,804.89	403,260.49	5,799.23	Western Visayas
4	Lapu-Lapu City	336,170.24	379,427.88	5,771.16	Central Visayas
5	Cebu City	316,405.41	348,163.24	5,431.85	Central Visayas
6	Mandaue	292,850.37	322,613.40	5,027.47	Central Visayas
7	Davao City	271,957.52	322,811.17	4,668.80	Davao Region
8	Angeles City	249,101.40	280,778.64	4,276.42	Central Luzon
9	Bacolod	233,093.69	288,580.13	4,001.61	Negros Island Region
10	Iligan	226,286.48	264,177.29	3,884.75	Northern Mindanao
11	Olongapo	225,681.73	258,305.04	3,874.36	Central Luzon
12	Tacloban	202,694.50	239,198.91	3,479.73	Eastern Visayas
13	Puerto Princesa	197,236.10	238,531.54	3,386.03	Mimaropa
14	General Santos	196,959.89	226,216.75	3,381.29	Soccsksargen
15	Lucena	171,426.48	196,136.89	2,942.94	Calabarzon
16	Butuan	163,852.49	184,977.04	2,812.92	Caraga
17	Zamboanga City	159,678.16	189,709.35	2,741.26	Zamboanga Peninsula

== See also ==
- List of ASEAN country subdivisions by GDP
