= GEN2PHEN =

Project to build Genotype to Phenotype database

Genotype to Phenotype Databases: a Holistic Approach (GEN2PHEN) is a European project aiming to develop a knowledge web portal integrating information from the genotype (G) to the phenotype (P) in a unifying portal: The Knowledge Centre. It is funded by the Health Thematic Area of the Cooperation Programme of the European Commission within the VII Framework Programme for Research and Technological Development.

== Overview ==
The GEN2PHEN project aims to unify human and model organism genetic variation databases into a single Genotype-To-Phenotype (G2P) data, and to link this system into other biomedical knowledge sources via genome browser functionality. This will consist of a European-centred but globally networked hierarchy of bioinformatics GRID-linked databases, tools and standards, all tied into the Ensembl genome browser. The project has the following specific objectives:

- Study existing G2P databases and approaches to determine gaps
- Develop key standards for the G2P database field
- Create G2P infrastructure components: database, services, and their integration
- Create methods to search and present data from G2P corpus
- Facilitate expansion of G2P databases
- Build a G2P internet portal
- Deploy GEN2PHEN outcomes to the community
- Conduct a whole-system utility and validation pilot study

== Motivation ==
GEN2PHEN is inspired by the increasing availability of gene sequences ("parts list") and powerful assays ("toolkit") to explore the genetic hierarchy i.e., how genes cause disease and other phenotypes. Genetics studies have shown that inter-individual genome variation plays a major role in differential normal development and disease processes. However, details of how these relationships work are unclear, even in the case of most Mendelian disorders. Background genetic effects (modifier genes), epistasis, somatic variation, and environmental factors all complicate the inference of causality, particularly in complex disorders such as cancer, heart disease, diabetes, dementia. Regardless, a common need of these studies is to generate large datasets and integrate these more effectively, facilitated by efforts such as GEN2PHEN.

== Partners ==
- University of Leicester, UK
- European Molecular Biology Laboratory, Germany
- Fundació IMIM, Spain
- Leiden University Medical Center, Netherlands
- Institut National de la Santé et de la Recherche Médicale, France
- Karolinska Institutet, Sweden
- Foundation for Research and Technology – Hellas, Greece
- Commissariat à l’Energie Atomique, France
- Erasmus University Medical Center, Netherlands
- Institute for Molecular Medicine Finland, University of Helsinki, Finland
- University of Aveiro – IEETA, Portugal
- University of Western Cape, South Africa
- Council of Scientific and Industrial Research, India
- Swiss Institute of Bioinformatics, Switzerland
- University of Manchester, UK
- BioBase GmbH, Germany
- deCODE genetics ehf, Iceland
- Biocomputing Platforms Ltd Oy, Finland
- University of Patras, Greece
- University Medical Center Groningen (UMCG), Netherlands (From March 2012)
- University of Lund (ULUND), Sweden (From March 2012)
- Synapse Research Management Partners, Spain. (From March 2012)

== See also ==
- GWAS Central
- Leiden Open Variation Database
- Locus Reference Genomic (LRG)
