= GWAS Central =

Genetic association study database

GWAS Central (previously HGBASE, HGVbase and HGVbaseG2P) is a publicly available database of summary-level findings from genetic association studies in humans, including genome-wide association studies (GWAS).

It is funded through the GEN2PHEN project by the European Union under their Seventh Framework Programme.

== Scope ==
GWAS Central contains a large collection of summary-level p-value GWAS data. The web resource employs powerful graphical and text based data presentation methods for discovery of and simultaneous visualisation and co-examination of many studies, at genome-wide and region-specific levels. Studies of interest can now be identified using chromosomal regions/genes and markers; there is also the facility for researchers to view their own data alongside selected studies.

Current content includes ‘top’ p-values from collections; supplementary data; direct researcher submissions; and publicly available data. Consequently, the database now hosts >21 million p-values and 708 studies, representing ~5% of all such data yet produced. GWAS Central makes parts of its data freely available for download by the research community. However, only parts of the data may be downloaded freely, the whole database content can be accessed as part of a collaboration.

== History ==
The Human Genome Bi-Allelic SEquence (HGBASE) database was the first version of what is now GWAS Central. It was first released in August 1998, focusing on providing a centralized collection of known human single nucleotide polymorphisms and other simple DNA variants. It was the first publicly available SNP database. The project was expanded over the next year by a consortium including the Karolinska Institute, the European Bioinformatics Institute and the European Molecular Biology Laboratory. Corporate support was provided by Pfizer and GlaxoSmithKline. The version released in November 2001 was renamed the Human Genome Variation database (HGVbase), as this was a better reflection of the scope of the database and its emphasis on collection from many different laboratories. In addition this also highlighted its new role as a central repository for data collection efforts in collaboration with the Human Genome Variation Society

HGVbase was scaled back in 2004 to simply provide an alternative representation of the full marker list from dbSNP, but development continued on its successor: the Human Genome Variation Genotype-to-Phenotype database (HGVbaseG2P), in many ways the natural evolution of HGVbase into a central database for summary-level genetic association data. The work was originally funded by GlaxoSmithKline, the University of Leicester, and the European Community's Sixth Framework Programme ('INFOBIOMED' Network of Excellence), but the GEN2PHEN project became the main source of funds in 2008. Early work in the project involved devising a powerful way of modeling phenotype and genotype- phenotype data, which itself was adopted and adapted to become the global standard Phenotype And Genotype Experiment Object model. In 2008 HGVbaseG2P went live and extended the project's content and scope by adding a far broader and more comprehensive range of markers (i.e., SNPs, structural variants, and STSs), along with association data from many genetic association studies.

In February 2010, the project was once again renamed to GWAS Central, to reflect the growing focus on genome-wide association studies. GWAS Central is a core component of the GEN2PHEN project and intends to provide an operational model, plus an open-source software package, so others can create similar databases across the world. These will be hosted by institutes, consortia, and even individual laboratories; providing those groups a toolkit for publicising and publishing their genetic association findings on the web and examine their data alongside others data from similar valuable resources.
