= List of Vietnamese subdivisions by GDP =

The article lists Vietnam's province-level divisions by Gross regional domestic product (GRDP). Each province's GRDP is listed in both the national currency VND, and at nominal U.S. dollar values according to annual average exchange rates and according to purchasing power parity (PPP).

== 2025 ==
List of Vietnamese Region by 2025 GRDP
Rank	Region	Population	GRDP (billion VND)	GRDP (billion USD)	Per capita (USD)	Export (billion USD)
1	Southeast	21,277,800	3,995,124	159.95	7,517	145.54
2	Red River Delta	25,070,400	3,874,609	155.13	6,188	203.11
3	South Central Coast and Central Highlands	16,024,400	1,570,480	62.88	3,924	19.88
4	Mekong Delta	15,853,300	1,336,189	53.5	3,375	21.23
5	Northern midland and moutainous	12,730,300	1,100,416	44.06	3,461	70.46
6	North Central Coast	11,389,100	903,917	36.19	3,178	14.782
Total		102,295,300	12,847,590	514.7	5,066	475

List of Vietnamese provinces by 2025 GRDP
Rank	Provinces	GRDP (billion VND)	GRDP (billion USD)	Real GDP Growth	GRDP per capita (USD)	Export (billion USD)
1	Thành phố Hồ Chí Minh	2,972,537	119,01	7.53%	8,623	92.68
2	Hà Nội	1,587,379	63.55	8.16%	7,174	20.89
3	Hải Phòng	734,421	29.4	11.81%	7,086	46.55
4	Đồng Nai	677,932	27.14	9.63%	6,045	35.01
5	Bắc Ninh province	522,618	20.92	10.27%	5,852	93.27
6	Phú Thọ province	412,401	16.51	10.52%	4,460	36.59
7	Quảng Ninh	368,445	14.75	11.89%	10,462	6.51
8	Lâm Đồng	353,220	14.14	6.42%	4,208	2.29
9	Tây Ninh province	344,655	13.8	9.52%	4,728	17.85
10	Ninh Bình province	342,812	13.73	10.65%	3,572	26.34
11	Thanh Hóa province	333,617	13.36	8.27%	3,542	7.16
12	Hưng Yên province	318,934	12.77	8.78%	3,967	9.55
13	Đà Nẵng	316,058	12.65	9.18%	4,432	4.57
14	Cần Thơ	306,170	12.26	7.23%	3,802	4.16
15	An Giang	296,423	11.87	8.39%	3,212	2.35
16	Đồng Tháp	286,053	11.45	7.38%	3,424	9.34
17	Vĩnh Long province	278,482	11.15	5.84%	3,295	3.68
18	Gia Lai	270,698	10.84	7.2%	3,406	3.79
19	Nghệ An	236,518	9.47	8.44%	2,708	3.85
20	Đắk Lắk	229,550	9.19	6.68%	3,226	3.12
21	Thái Nguyên province	192,480	7.71	6.33%	4,576	30.11
22	Khánh Hòa	209,342	8.38	7.11%	4,411	2.79
23	Quảng Ngãi	191,612	7.67	10.02%	4,043	3.32
24	Cà Mau province	169,061	6.77	7.23%	3,204	1.70
25	Lào Cai province	142,057	5.69	8.14%	3,406	1.35
26	Quảng Trị province	123,380	5.09	8%	3,190	0.732
27	Hà Tĩnh province	120,811	4.84	8.78%	3,625	1.51
28	Sơn La province	96,005	3.84	8.03%	2,866	0.027
29	Tuyên Quang province	95,634	3.83	6.4%	2,176	0.467
30	Huế	89,591	3.59	8.5%	3,016	1.53
31	Lạng Sơn province	58,273	2.33	8.07%	2,843	1.82
32	Lai Châu province	39,974	1.6	7.552%	3,193	0.037
33	Điện Biên province	35,657	1.43	7.34%	2,143	0.053
34	Cao Bằng province	27,935	1.12	7.22%	1,987	0.006

== See also ==
- List of ASEAN country subdivisions by GDP
