= GPG =

- Global public good, in economics, a public good available worldwide
- GNU Privacy Guard, cryptography software
- Goals against average (GAA), also known as goals per game, sports statistic
- Grains per gallon, water hardness measurement
- The Good Pub Guide, recommends pubs in the UK
- Generalized Petersen graph, a type of mathematical graph

== Companies ==
- Guinness Peat Group, an investment holding company
- Grammophon-Philips Group, a previous name for record company PolyGram
- Greenwood Publishing Group, an educational and academic publisher in the USA
- Gas Powered Games, and their GPGNet online matchmaking service
