= Grain (unit) =

Unit of mass

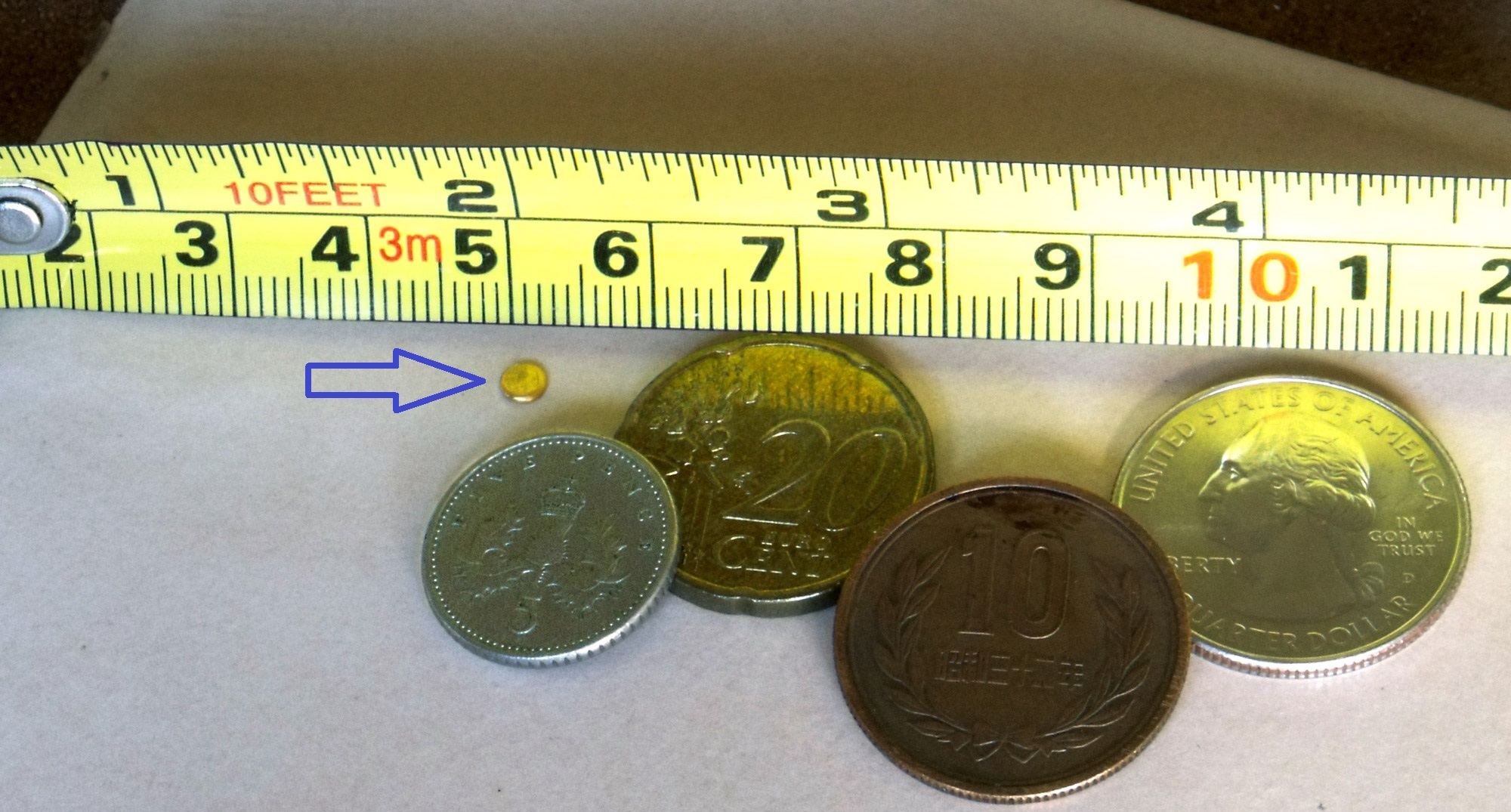
- The small golden disc close to the 5 cm marker is a piece of pure gold weighing one grain. Shown for comparison is a tape measure and coins of various world currencies.

General information
- Unit system: Troy weight, avoirdupois weight, apothecaries' weight
- Unit of: Mass
- Symbol: gr

Conversions
1 gr in ...	... is equal to ...
- Troy: 1/5760 troy pound
- Avoirdupois: 1/7000 pound
- Apothecaries': 1/5760 apothecaries' pound
- SI units: 64.79891 mg

A grain is a unit of measurement of mass, and in the troy weight, avoirdupois, and apothecaries' systems, equal to exactly 64.79891 milligrams. It is nominally based upon the mass of a single ideal seed of a cereal. From the Bronze Age into the Renaissance, the average masses of wheat and barley grains were part of the legal definitions of units of mass. Expressions such as "thirty-two grains of wheat, taken from the middle of the ear" appear to have been ritualistic formulas. Another source states that it was defined such that 252.458 units would balance 1 cubic inch (16 cm^{3}) of distilled water at an ambient air-water pressure and temperature of 30 inches of mercury (100 kPa) and 62 °F (17 °C) respectively. Another book states that Captain Henry Kater, of the British Standards Commission, arrived at this value experimentally.

The grain was the legal foundation of traditional English weight systems, and is the only unit that is equal throughout the troy, avoirdupois, and apothecaries' systems of mass. The unit was based on the weight of a single grain of barley which was equal to about 4/3 the weight of a single grain of wheat. The fundamental unit of the pre-1527 English weight system, known as Tower weights, was based on the wheat grain. The tower "wheat" grain was defined as exactly 45/64 (≈ 3/4) of the troy "barley" grain.

Since the implementation of the international yard and pound agreement of 1 July 1959, the grain or troy grain (symbol: gr) measure has been defined in terms of units of mass in the International System of Units as precisely 64.79891 milligrams. One gram is thus approximately equivalent to 15.43236 grains. The unit formerly used by jewellers to measure pearls, diamonds, and other precious stones, called the jeweller's grain or pearl grain, is equal to 1/4 carat (50 mg; 0.77 gr). The grain was also the name of a traditional French unit equal to 53.115 mg.

In both British Imperial units and United States customary units, there are precisely 7,000 grains per avoirdupois pound, and 5,760 grains per troy pound or apothecaries' pound. It is obsolete in the United Kingdom and, like most other non-SI units, it has no basis in law and cannot be used in commerce.

== Volume ==
In United States customary units, the "grain of water" exists as a unit of volume, conventionally defined as the volume of a mass of water equal to 1 grain at a density of 1 g/mL. As such, 1 grain of water corresponds to 0.06479891 millilitres. It is commonly used to measure the case capacity of cartridges.

== Current usage ==
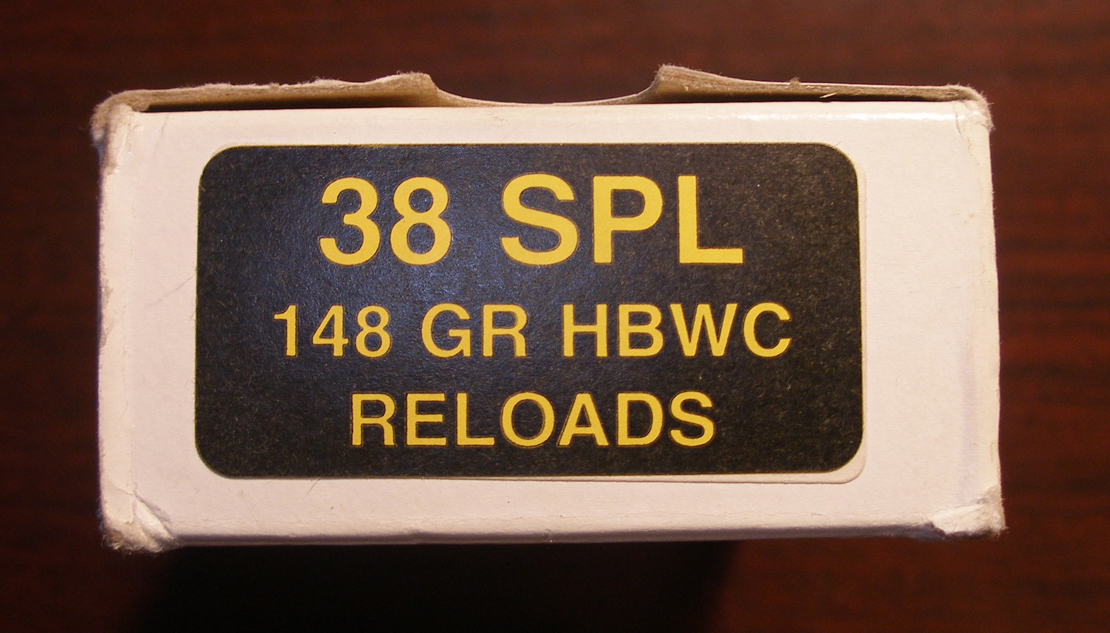
A box of .38 Special (9.1 mm) cartridges that have 148-grain (9.6 g) bullets

Grains are commonly used to measure the mass of bullets and propellants. In archery, the grain is the standard unit used to weigh arrows.

In North America, the hardness of water is often measured in grains per U.S. gallon (gpg) of calcium carbonate equivalents. Otherwise, water hardness is measured in the dimensionless unit of parts per million (ppm), numerically equivalent to concentration measured in milligrams per litre. One grain per U.S. gallon is approximately 17.1 ppm. (Note: The exact value of one grain per U.S. gallon is 64.79891/3.785411784 mg/L (ppm).) Soft water contains 1–4 gpg of calcium carbonate equivalents, while hard water contains 11–20 gpg.

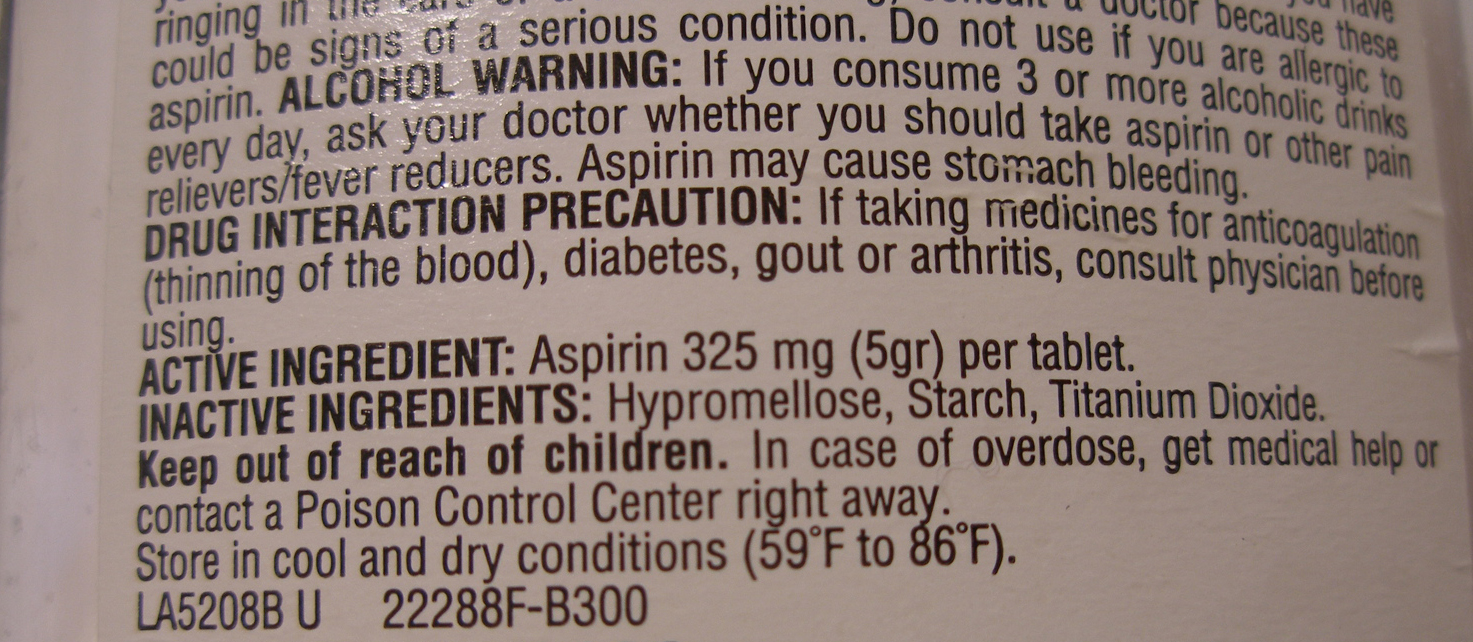
A five-grain aspirin. The usage guidance label on a bottle of aspirin indicates that the dosage is "325 mg (5 gr)".

Though no longer recommended, in the U.S., grains are still used occasionally in medicine as part of the apothecaries' system, especially in prescriptions for older medicines such as aspirin or phenobarbital. For example, the dosage of a standard 325 mg tablet of aspirin is sometimes given as 5 grains. In that example the grain is approximated to 65 mg, though the grain can also be approximated to 60 mg, depending on the medication and manufacturer. The apothecaries' system has its own system of notation, in which the units symbol or abbreviation is followed by the quantity in lower case Roman numerals. For amounts less than one, the quantity is written as a fraction, or for one half, ss (or variations such as ss., ṡṡ, or s̅s̅). Therefore, a prescription for tablets containing 325 mg of aspirin and 30 mg of codeine can be written "ASA gr. v c̄ cod. gr. ss tablets" (using the medical abbreviations ASA for acetylsalicylic acid [aspirin], c̄ for "with", and cod. for codeine). The apothecaries' system has gradually been replaced by the metric system, and the use of the grain in prescriptions is now rare.

In the U.S., particulate emission levels, used to monitor and regulate pollution, are sometimes measured in grains per cubic foot instead of the more usual ppm by volume. This is the same unit commonly used to measure the amount of moisture in the air, also known as the absolute humidity. The SI unit used to measure particulate emissions and absolute humidity is mg/m^{3}. One grain per cubic foot is approximately 2288 mg/m^{3}. (Note: The exact value of one grain per cubic foot is 64.79891/ 0.028316846592 mg/m^{3}.)

== History ==
Approximate weights of grains used for trading in antiquity
Grain	Approx. SI mass
carob seed	200 mg
barley grain	65 mg
wheat grain	50 mg

At least since antiquity, grains of wheat or barley were used by Mediterranean traders to define units of mass; along with other seeds, especially those of the carob tree. According to a longstanding tradition, one carat (the mass of a carob seed) was equivalent to the weight of four wheat grains or three barleycorns. Since the weights of these seeds are highly variable, especially that of the cereals as a function of moisture, this is a convention more than an absolute law.

The history of the modern British grain can be traced back to a royal decree in thirteenth century England, re-iterating decrees that go back as far as King Offa (eighth century). The Tower pound was one of many monetary pounds of 240 silver pennies.

By consent of the whole Realm the King's Measure was made, so that an English Penny, which is called the Sterling, round without clipping, shall weigh Thirty-two Grains of Wheat dry in the midst of the Ear; Twenty pennies make an Ounce; and Twelve Ounces make a Pound.

— Tractatus de Ponderibus et Mensuris

The pound in question is the Tower pound. The Tower pound, abolished in 1527, consisted of 12 ounces like the troy pound, but was 1/16 (≈6%) lighter. The weight of the original sterling pennies was 22 1/2 troy grains, or 32 "Tower grains".

Physical grain weights were made and sold commercially at least as late as the early 1900s, and took various forms, from squares of sheet metal to manufactured wire shapes and coin-like weights.

The troy pound was only "the pound of Pence, Spices, Confections, as of Electuaries", as such goods might be measured by a troi or small balance. The old troy standard was set by King Offa's currency reform, and was in full use in 1284 (Assize of Weights and Measures, King Edward I), but was restricted to currency (the pound of pennies) until it was abolished in 1527. This pound was progressively replaced by a new pound, based on the weight of 120 silver dirhems of 48 grains. The new pound used a barley-corn grain, rather than a wheat grain.

Avoirdupois (goods of weight) refers to those things measured by the lesser but quicker balances: the bismar or auncel, the Roman balance, and the steelyard. The original mercantile pound of 25 shillings or 15 (Tower) ounces was displaced by, variously, the pound of the Hanseatic League (16 tower ounces) and by the pound of the then-important wool trade (16 ounces of 437 grains). A new pound of 7,680 grains was inadvertently created as 16 troy ounces, referring to the new troy rather than the old troy. Eventually, the wool pound won out.

The avoirdupois pound was defined in prototype, rated as 6,992 to 7,004 grains. In the Imperial Weights and Measures Act 1824 (5 Geo. 4. c. 74), the avoirdupois pound was defined as 7,000 grains exactly. The Weights and Measures Act 1855 authorised Miller's new standards to replace those lost in the fire that destroyed the Houses of Parliament. The standard was an avoirdupois pound, the grain being defined as 1/7000 of it.

The division of the carat into four grains survives in both senses well into the early twentieth century. For pearls and diamonds, weight is quoted in carats, divided into four grains. The carat was eventually set to 205 milligrams (1877), and later 200 milligrams. For touch or fineness of gold, the fraction of gold was given as a weight, the total being a solidus of 24 carats or 96 grains.

== See also ==
- English unit
