= List of ASEAN countries by GDP =

Southeast Asian nation finances

This is a list of ASEAN countries by GDP.

== GDP Composition ==
GDP (millions of current international dollar) by country
Country	Percent			Nominal			PPP			Year
Country	A (Note: Agriculture, forestry, and fishing Value Added.)	I (Note: Industry (including construction) Value Added.)	S (Note: Services Value Added.)	Agricultural	Industrial	Services	Agricultural	Industrial	Services	Year
ASEAN	9.7%	36.4%	50.5%	351,465	1,318,636	1,828,289	1,084,324	3,843,914	5,040,228	2022
Indonesia	12.4%	41.4%	41.8%	163,568	546,107	551,384	500,576	1,671,277	1,687,425	2022
Thailand	8.8%	35.0%	56.2%	43,590	173,369	278,381	130,425	518,734	832,929	2022
Singapore	0.0%	24.2%	70.9%	131	112,963	330,953	201	174,018	509,831	2022
Vietnam	11.9%	38.3%	41.3%	48,647	156,571	168,835	157,230	506,041	545,679	2022
Malaysia	8.9%	39.2%	50.8%	36,161	159,272	206,403	100,986	444,794	576,416	2022
Philippines	9.5%	29.2%	61.2%	38,407	118,051	247,422	111,243	341,927	716,641	2022
Myanmar	20.3%	41.1%	38.6%	12,051	24,399	22,915	53,562	108,444	101,848	2022
Cambodia	21.9%	37.7%	33.7%	6,561	11,294	10,095	19,644	33,817	30,229	2022
Brunei	1.1%	67.9%	32.5%	183	11,327	5,421	342	21,120	10,109	2022
Laos	14.6%	33.6%	41.2%	2,296	5,283	6,478	10,316	23,741	29,111	2022

== GDP ==
GDP Nominal is the total value of the market products and services that an economy produces in the current market prices. In short, it is the raw economic output of a nation without any adjustments for inflation or deflation. GDP PPP stands for Gross Domestic Product at Purchasing Power Parity. While Nominal GDP measures an economy's size using standard market exchange rates, GDP PPP adjusts the calculation to account for the local cost of living in each country. It evaluates economic output based on what people can actually buy with their money locally, rather than just the raw currency conversion.

=== List 2025 ===
GDP and GDP per capita for 2025 estimate, according to IMF.

No	Country	Population in million	GDP Nominal millions of USD	GDP Nominal per capita USD	GDP (PPP) millions of USD	GDP (PPP) per capita USD
—	ASEAN	699.559	4,167,690	5,904	13,152,260	19,048
1	Indonesia	285.721	1,440,000 2025e)	5,082	5,020,000	17,746
2	Singapore	5.870	574,180 2025e)	99,365	879,980	164,318
3	Thailand	71.619	558,570 2025e)	8,057	1,850,000	26,260
4	Philippines	116.786	494,160 2025e)	4,270	1,480,000	12,877
5	Vietnam	101.598	484,720 2025e)	4,829	1,940,000	17,971
6	Malaysia	35.977	470,570 2025e)	13,949	1,480,000	44,119
7	Myanmar	54.850	64,940 2025f)	1,502	326,890	5,047
8	Cambodia	17.847	49,800 2025f)	2,762	150,050	8,403
9	Brunei	0.466	16,010 2025f)	34,678	43,830	93,731
10	Laos	7.873	16,320 2025f)	2,288	78,850	10,380
11	Timor-Leste	1.418	2,130 2025f)	1,464	6,970	5,060

=== List 2024 ===
GDP and GDP per capita data end of 2024, according to IMF global macro models and analysts expectations for Selected Countries and Subjects.

No	Country	Population in million	GDP Nominal millions of USD	GDP Nominal per capita USD	GDP (PPP) millions of USD	GDP (PPP) per capita USD
—	ASEAN	685.012	3,984,477	5,814	12,231,003	17,855
1	Indonesia	282.018	1,404,452	4,980	4,663,589	16,540
2	Singapore	5.938	547,390	89,372	879,986	148,196
3	Thailand	70.223	526,412	7,532	1,774,663	25,213
4	Vietnam	100.707	476,388	4,711	1,667,654	16,493
5	Philippines	113.267	461,620	4,150	1,370,494	12,080
6	Malaysia	33.467	419,620	13,140	1,370,293	41,025
7	Myanmar	54.524	64,284	1,179	283,747	5,205
8	Cambodia	17.182	47,147	2,744	139,801	8,137
9	Brunei	0.450	15,710	34,871	41,016	91,046
10	Laos	7.686	14,949	1,945	74,760	9,727

=== List 2023 ===
GDP and GDP per capita data are according to IMF for 2023 data.

No	Country	Population in million	GDP Nominal millions of USD	GDP Nominal per capita USD	GDP (PPP) millions of USD	GDP (PPP) per capita USD
—	ASEAN	679.392	3,795,866	5,587	11,412,834	16,798
1	Indonesia	278.749	1,371,171	4,919	4,334,721	15,553
2	Thailand	70.188	514,836	7,335	1,683,069	23,981
3	Singapore	5.917	501,428	84,734	837,665	141,554
4	Philippines	111.916	437,146	3,906	1,262,499	11,281
5	Vietnam	100.301	433,702	4,324	1,502,664	14,981
6	Malaysia	33.060	399,705	12,090	1,279,182	38,693
7	Myanmar	54.205	64,505	1,190	274,338	5,061
8	Cambodia	17.015	43,304	2,545	129,428	7,608
9	Brunei	0.450	15,126	33,576	39,133	86,866
10	Laos	7.585	14,943	1,970	70,135	9,250

=== List 2022 ===
GDP and GDP per capita data are according to IMF for 2022 data.

No	Country	Population in million	GDP Nominal millions of USD	GDP Nominal per capita USD	GDP (PPP) millions of USD	GDP (PPP) per capita USD
—	ASEAN	672.397	3,657,636	5,439	10,316,112	15,342
1	Indonesia	274.859	1,318,807	4,798	4,036,878	14,687
2	Thailand	70.078	536,160	7,650	1,482,347	21,152
3	Singapore	5.637	466,789	82,807	719,080	127,563
4	Malaysia	32.993	407,923	12,364	1,134,671	34,391
5	Vietnam	99.462	406,452	4,086	1,321,249	13,284
6	Philippines	115.559	404,261	3,623	1,171,162	10,497
7	Myanmar	53.886	56,757	1,053	261,170	4,846
8	Cambodia	16.767	28,820	1,718	89,570	5,342
9	Brunei	0.442	16,639	37,667	31,142	70,500
10	Laos	7.477	15,304	2,046	69,843	9,207

== See also ==
- List of ASEAN country subdivisions by GDP
- List of ASEAN country and subdivisions by Wage
