= Leiden Open Variation Database =

Open source database

The Leiden Open Variation Database (LOVD) is a free, flexible web-based open source database developed in the Leiden University Medical Center in the Netherlands, designed to collect and display variants in the DNA sequence. The focus of an LOVD is usually the combination between a gene and a genetic (heritable) disease. All sequence variants found in individuals are collected in the database, together with information about whether they could be causally connected to the disease (i.e. a disease-causing variant or mutation) or not (i.e. a non-disease causing variant). Specialized doctors (clinical geneticists) use LOVDs to diagnose and advise patients carrying a genetic disease. Ideally, if a patient has been screened for mutations and one has been found, information in LOVD can predict the progress of the disease.

In contrast to human genome databases, showing information on all DNA variants, LOVDs include information about the individuals in which the variants were found. This patient information is usually only accessible for registered users.

Currently, LOVD installations worldwide contain more than 515,500 variant observations (124,000 unique variants in 5175 genes) in 162,000 patients.

== Background ==
As the Human Genome Project has completed, the collection and study of all sequence variation between individuals is of increasing importance to understand the relationship between DNA variations and disease. Direct access to up-to-date information on sequence variation is currently provided most efficiently through web-based, gene-centered, locus-specific databases (LSDBs). While over 1600 of these LSDBs exist online, sharing information or combining data of these databases is extremely hard if they are not software-based or use custom software. LOVD is a member of the GEN2PHEN project, a European Commission funded project which aims to unify these LSDBs with each other. Currently, LOVD installations make out 57% to 90% of all LSDBs.

The LOVD software was developed to create an "LSDB-in-a-Box". It should allow the easy creation and maintenance of a gene sequence variation database using the internet. LOVD is platform-independent and uses PHP and MySQL open source software only. The gene-centered design of the database follows the recommendations of the Human Genome Variation Society (HGVS) and focuses on ease of use and flexibility. The newest LOVD version, released late 2012, also allows to process Next-generation sequencing data, which often results in large numbers of variants found in between genes as well. To ensure the use of unambiguous sequence variant descriptions in newly submitted data, LOVD interacts with Mutalyzer, which applies the HGVS human nomenclature guidelines to check and, if necessary, correct sequence variant descriptions.
