= PCP =

PCP may refer to:

== Science ==
=== Medicine ===
- Pharmacy Council of Pakistan
- Pneumocystis pneumonia, a form of pneumonia caused by the yeast-like fungus Pneumocystis jirovecii
- Post-coital pill, a form of emergency contraception
- Primary care paramedic, the entry-level of paramedic practice in Canada
- Primary care physician, a doctor who acts as first point of consultation for patients

=== Chemistry and biochemistry ===
- Phencyclidine, a hallucinogenic and dissociative recreational drug, also known as angel dust
  - 3-HO-PCP, a designer drug related to phencyclidine
  - 3-MeO-PCP, a designer drug related to phencyclidine
  - 4-MeO-PCP, a research chemical related to phencyclidine
- Pentachlorophenol, an organochlorine compound used as a timber preservative herbicide, insecticide, fungicide and algaecide
- Lysosomal Pro-X carboxypeptidase, an enzyme
- Peptidyl carrier protein, related in structure to acyl carrier proteins
- Peridinin-chlorophyll-protein complex, a complex of protein and pigment molecules found in dinoflagellates

=== Other ===
- Parallel coordinates plot, a common way of visualizing high-dimensional geometry and analyzing multivariate data
- Planar cell polarity, a mechanism in embryonic development
- Put–call parity, in financial mathematics, a relationship between the price of a call option and a put option

== Computing ==
- Probabilistically checkable proof, a notion in the theory of computational complexity
  - PCP theorem, a related theorem
- Performance Co-Pilot, an open-source performance monitoring system
- Port Control Protocol, a computer networking protocol allowing hosts to create explicit port forwarding rules on default gateways
- Post correspondence problem, an important problem in computability theory
- Primary Control Program, an option in OS/360
- Principia Cybernetica Project, an organization and website devoted to evolutionary-cybernetic philosophy
- Priority ceiling protocol, a computer science concept
- Priority Code Point, a three-bit priority field within an Ethernet frame header when using IEEE 802.1q tagged frames

== Politics ==
=== Communist parties ===
- Palestine Communist Party
- Paraguayan Communist Party
- Portuguese Communist Party
- Puerto Rican Communist Party
- Partido Comunista del Peru, several different left-oriented organizations in Peru
  - Shining Path (Partido Comunista del Perú)
  - Partido Comunista del Perú - Patria Roja (PCP-BR)
- Peruvian Communist Party

=== Other parties ===
- Personal Choice Party, a former minor party in Utah, United States
- Progressive Conservative Party of Canada, 1942-2003
- Proletarian Catalan Party (1934–1936), in Catalonia, Spain

== Other uses ==
- PCP - Perfect Crime Party, part of the Bakuman franchise
- PCP Torpedo, 1998 EP by American grindcore band Agoraphobic Nosebleed
- Person-centred planning, life-planning model
- Personal care products
- Personal contract purchase, a vehicle financing product
- Pre-charged pneumatic, a type of air gun
- Purple City Productions, a US rap group
- Proto-Central Pacific, a proto-language

== See also ==
- "Faster/P.C.P.", a single by Manic Street Preachers, from their 1994 album The Holy Bible
- PCPA, para-chloro-phenylalanine or fenclonine (PCPA)
- pCPP, para-Chlorophenylpiperazine
- PGP (disambiguation)
