= List of ASEAN country subdivisions by GDP =

Largest economies in the ASEAN Subdivions by GDP (nominal) in 2023 (for
Indonesia Malaysia and Philippines), in 2022 (for Thailand and Vietnam)
according to local statistics

Largest economies in the ASEAN Subdivions by GDP (PPP) in 2023 (for
Indonesia Malaysia and Philippines), in 2022 (for Thailand and Vietnam)
according to local statistics

This is a list of ASEAN country subdivisions by GDP are based on official exchange rates market exchange rates (Nominal) and Purchasing Power Parity (PPP) methodology. These figures have been taken from using data from Indonesian provinces, Malaysia states, Philippine, Thai, and Vietnam regions. GDP and GDP per capita data are according to International Monetary Fund's October 2023 estimates. Badan Pusat Statistik Indonesia, Department of Statistics Malaysia, Philippine Statistics Authority, NESDC Thailand, GSO Vietnam. The figures are given or expressed in Millions of current market and International Dollars at current prices.

Gross domestic product (GDP) is the market value of all final goods and services from a nation in a given year. Nominal GDP does not take into account differences in the cost of living in different countries, and the results can vary greatly from one year to another based on fluctuations in the exchange rates of the country's currency.

GDP comparisons using PPP take into account the relative cost of local goods, services and inflation rates of the country, rather than using international market exchange rates, which may distort the real differences in per capita income. It is however limited when measuring financial flows between countries and when comparing the quality of same goods among countries. PPP is often used to gauge global poverty thresholds and is used by the United Nations in constructing the human development index.

== By administrative division ==
First level administration (only above U$10 billion) by recent data

| Subdivision | Country | Type | Area (km^{2}) | Population Estimates | GDP Nominal | | GDP PPP | | Year |
| Subdivision | Country | Type | Area (km^{2}) | Population Estimates | (in million $) | Per capita | (in million $) | PPP Per Capita | Year |
|---|---|---|---|---|---|---|---|---|---|
| Bangkok Region | Thailand | Region | 7,681 | 17,400,000 | 250,772 | 14,186 | 843,362 | 48,470 | 2024 |
| Jakarta | Indonesia | Special Province | 662 | 11,350,328 | 225,883 | 21,166 | 724,010 | 67,842 | 2023 |
| East Java | Indonesia | Province | 48,037 | 41,150,000 | 193,773 | 4,667 | 621,089 | 14,956 | 2023 |
| West Java | Indonesia | Province | 37,053 | 49,860,330 | 172,232 | 3,454 | 552,046 | 11,072 | 2023 |
| Southeast Vietnam | Vietnam | Region | 28,046 | 20,761,700 | 160,260 | 6,530 | 572,657 | 27,583 | 2025 |
| Red River Delta | Vietnam | Region | 27,092 | 24,444,100 | 155,490 | 6,459 | 555,445 | 22,723 | 2025 |
| NCR (Metro Manila) | Philippines | Capital Region | 636 | 14,001,751 | 143,800 | 10,426 | 398,607 | 27,949 | 2024 |
| Selangor | Malaysia | State | 8,104 | 7,406,800 | 123,435 | 16,440 | 388,458 | 51,736 | 2025 |
| Central Java | Indonesia | Province | 34,347 | 37,608,336 | 111,321 | 2,965 | 356,812 | 9,505 | 2023 |
| Eastern Thailand | Thailand | Region | 34,481 | 5,951,000 | 94,061 | 14,183 | 316,332 | 53,165 | 2024 |
| Kuala Lumpur | Malaysia | Federal Territories | 243 | 2,074,100 | 74,794 | 33,831 | 235,382 | 106,542 | 2025 |
| North Sumatra | Indonesia | Province | 72,438 | 15,386,640 | 68,953 | 4,481 | 221,009 | 14,364 | 2023 |
| Riau | Indonesia | Province | 69,901 | 6,614,384 | 67,344 | 10,138 | 215,852 | 32,494 | 2023 |
| South Central Coast and Central Highlands | Vietnam | Region | 99,153 | 15,687,600 | 62,880 | 3,910 | 224,681 | 14,322 | 2025 |
| Calabarzon | Philippines | Region | 16,873 | 16,195,042 | 61,779 | 3,647 | 180,875 | 10,678 | 2023 |
| East Kalimantan | Indonesia | Province | 127,347 | 4,030,488 | 55,344 | 14,155 | 177,391 | 45,372 | 2023 |
| Mekong River Delta | Vietnam | Region | 43,000 | 15,719,900 | 54,420 | 3,386 | 194,458 | 12,371 | 2025 |
| Banten | Indonesia | Province | 9,356 | 12,307,732 | 53,412 | 4,340 | 171,199 | 13,910 | 2023 |
| Isan | Thailand | Region | 167,718 | 22,017,248 | 53,619 | 2,957 | 180,324 | 8,190 | 2024 |
| Southern Thailand | Thailand | Region | 73,848 | 9,600,000 | 47,785 | 4,829 | 159,694 | 16,549 | 2024 |
| Central Luzon | Philippines | Region | 22,015 | 12,422,172 | 47,658 | 3,697 | 139,531 | 10,823 | 2023 |
| Johor | Malaysia | State | 19,166 | 4,205,900 | 47,433 | 11,222 | 149,274 | 35,316 | 2025 |
| Sarawak | Malaysia | State | 124,450 | 2,529,800 | 45,632 | 17,233 | 143,607 | 54,233 | 2025 |
| Northern Midland and Mountainous Regions | Vietnam | Region | 101,392 | 12,451,200 | 44,990 | 3,095 | 160,768 | 12,451 | 2025 |
| South Sulawesi | Indonesia | Province | 45,324 | 9,362,290 | 42,813 | 4,573 | 137,227 | 14,657 | 2023 |
| South Sumatra | Indonesia | Province | 86,772 | 8,743,522 | 41,273 | 4,720 | 132,291 | 15,130 | 2023 |
| Northern Thailand | Thailand | Region | 96,077 | 12,250,000 | 41,237 | 3,711 | 138,682 | 11,275 | 2024 |
| Penang | Malaysia | State | 1,049 | 1,803,300 | 34,887 | 18,828 | 109,790 | 59,451 | 2025 |
| Lampung | Indonesia | Province | 33,570 | 9,419,600 | 29,450 | 3,162 | 94,393 | 10,135 | 2023 |
| North Central Coast | Vietnam | Region | 51,243 | 11,244,600 | 36,330 | 3,230 | 129,831 | 11,546 | 2025 |
| Central Visayas | Philippines | Region | 10,115 | 6,545,603 | 28,391 | 3,448 | 83,121 | 10,095 | 2023 |
| Sabah | Malaysia | State | 73,904 | 3,759,600 | 28,358 | 7,272 | 89,243 | 22,886 | 2025 |
| Perak | Malaysia | State | 20,976 | 2,574,900 | 26,078 | 9,804 | 82,070 | 30,852 | 2025 |
| Central Thailand | Thailand | Region | 84,118 | 3,444,000 | 25,026 | 8,340 | 84,145 | 28,047 | 2024 |
| Central Sulawesi | Indonesia | Province | 61,497 | 3,121,800 | 22,775 | 7,378 | 72,998 | 23,649 | 2023 |
| Davao Region | Philippines | Region | 20,357 | 5,389,422 | 22,565 | 4,079 | 66,066 | 11,944 | 2023 |
| Western Visayas | Philippines | Region | 12,751 | 4,730,771 | 22,379 | 2,765 | 65,520 | 8,097 | 2023 |
| Riau Islands | Indonesia | Province | 8,270 | 2,183,300 | 21,774 | 10,115 | 69,792 | 32,422 | 2023 |
| Northern Mindanao | Philippines | Region | 20,496 | 5,178,326 | 21,218 | 4,096 | 62,120 | 11,922 | 2023 |
| Pahang | Malaysia | State | 35,965 | 1,678,200 | 20,698 | 12,153 | 65,138 | 38,245 | 2025 |
| West Sumatra | Indonesia | Province | 42,108 | 5,836,200 | 20,520 | 3,564 | 65,771 | 11,424 | 2023 |
| Jambi | Indonesia | Province | 49,027 | 3,724,300 | 19,271 | 5,238 | 61,767 | 16,788 | 2023 |
| Western Thailand | Thailand | Region | 53,769 | 3,550,000 | 18,375 | 5,035 | 61,796 | 17,656 | 2024 |
| West Kalimantan | Indonesia | Province | 147,018 | 5,695,500 | 18,007 | 3,202 | 57,717 | 10,264 | 2023 |
| Bali | Indonesia | Province | 5,590 | 4,433,300 | 18,000 | 4,087 | 57,693 | 13,099 | 2023 |
| South Kalimantan | Indonesia | Province | 37,125 | 4,273,400 | 17,668 | 4,184 | 56,629 | 13,412 | 2023 |
| Negeri Sembilan | Malaysia | State | 6,686 | 1,244,600 | 16,450 | 12,945 | 51,768 | 40,739 | 2024 |
| Kedah | Malaysia | State | 9,492 | 2,228,000 | 15,393 | 6,668 | 48,442 | 20,983 | 2025 |
| Yangon Region | Myanmar | Region | 10,277 | 10,550,000 | 14,986 | 2,036 | 54,809 | 7,451 | 2021 |
| Aceh | Indonesia | Province | 56,839 | 5,554,800 | 14,900 | 2,718 | 47,758 | 8,711 | 2023 |
| Ilocos Region | Philippines | Region | 13,014 | 5,342,453 | 14,641 | 2,716 | 42,864 | 7,952 | 2023 |
| Malacca | Malaysia | State | 1,775 | 1,052,500 | 14,379 | 12,986 | 45,251 | 40,867 | 2025 |
| Central Kalimantan | Indonesia | Province | 153,430 | 2,809,700 | 13,702 | 4,940 | 43,917 | 15,833 | 2023 |
| Bicol Region | Philippines | Region | 18,156 | 6,064,426 | 12,617 | 2,002 | 36,939 | 5,862 | 2023 |
| Special Region of Yogyakarta | Indonesia | Province | 3,170 | 3,759,500 | 11,855 | 3,173 | 37,997 | 10,169 | 2023 |
| Southeast Sulawesi | Indonesia | Province | 36,139 | 2,793,100 | 11,559 | 4,205 | 37,048 | 13,477 | 2023 |
| North Sulawesi | Indonesia | Province | 14,488 | 2,701,800 | 11,282 | 4,207 | 36,163 | 13,486 | 2023 |
| Soccsksargen | Philippines | Region | 22,513 | 4,462,776 | 11,154 | 2,459 | 32,657 | 7,198 | 2023 |
| West Nusa Tenggara | Indonesia | Province | 19,676 | 5,695,500 | 10,917 | 1,963 | 34,990 | 6,293 | 2023 |
| Eastern Visayas | Philippines | Region | 23,251 | 4,625,929 | 10,225 | 2,076 | 29,937 | 6,077 | 2023 |
| Terengganu | Malaysia | State | 13,035 | 1,246,900 | 10,011 | 7,630 | 31,505 | 24,012 | 2025 |

== By megapolitan area ==
| Megapolitan | Country | Area (km^{2}) | Population | GDP Nominal | | GDP PPP | | Year |
| Megapolitan | Country | Area (km^{2}) | Population | (in million $) | Per capita | (in million $) | Per Capita | Year |
|---|---|---|---|---|---|---|---|---|
| Jabodetabekpunjur-Bandung Basin | Indonesia | 24,496 | 54,842,885 | 402,564 | 7,340 | 1,232,244 | 22,469 | 2022 |
| Bay of Bangkok Economic Rim | Thailand | 42,181 | 23,763,000 | 328,465 | 13,822 | 970,607 | 40,845 | 2022 |
| Mega Manila | Philippines | 50,525 | 41,099,507 | 275,000 | 6,700 | 829,182 | 20,174 | 2025 |
| Greater Kuala Lumpur | Malaysia | 12,668 | 10,750,000 | 218,007 | 20,280 | 686,081 | 86,797 | 2025 |
| Southeast Economic Zone | Vietnam | 30,579 | 22,933,631 | 137,593 | 5,999 | 447,271 | 19,502 | 2022 |
| Gerbangkertosusila-Greater Malang | Indonesia | 17,072 | 19,659,028 | 126,490 | 6,434 | 387,185 | 19,695 | 2022 |
| Red River Delta | Vietnam | 24,561 | 21,047,582 | 103,135 | 4,901 | 335,258 | 15,929 | 2022 |
| Northern States | Malaysia | 32,343 | 7,120,000 | 78,233 | 10,988 | 246,203 | 34,579 | 2025 |

== By metropolitan area ==
List ASEAN Metropolitan Area by GDP (only above U$10 billion) by recent data.

| Metropolitan | Country | Area (km^{2}) | Population estimates | GDP Nominal | | GDP PPP | | Year |
| Metropolitan | Country | Area (km^{2}) | Population estimates | (in million $) | Per capita | (in million $) | Per Capita | Year |
|---|---|---|---|---|---|---|---|---|
| Jakarta metropolitan area | Indonesia | 7,076 | 34,610,726 | 338,836 | 9,789 | 1,085,172 | 31,353 | 2023 |
| Greater Manila Area | Philippines | 8,100 | 29,050,584 | 255,000 | 8,763 | 768,878 | 26,467 | 2025 |
| Bangkok Metropolitan Region | Thailand | 7,762 | 17,251,000 | 250,775 | 14,186 | 844,851 | 48,974 | 2024 |
| Klang Valley | Malaysia | 3,450 | 8,309,689 | 182,000 | 22,470 | 572,765 | 68,933 | 2025 |
| Surabaya metropolitan area | Indonesia | 6,310 | 11,797,761 | 101,105 | 8,570 | 323,805 | 27,446 | 2023 |
| Bandung metropolitan area | Indonesia | 3,484 | 8,678,130 | 42,383 | 4,883 | 135,736 | 15,641 | 2023 |
| Greater Balikpapan-Samarinda | Indonesia | 5,691 | 2,503,272 | 33,160 | 13,246 | 106,201 | 42,425 | 2023 |
| Medan metropolitan area | Indonesia | 3,189 | 5,216,400 | 31,706 | 6,078 | 101,544 | 19,466 | 2023 |
| George Town Conurbation | Malaysia | 3,764 | 2,843,344 | 31,416 | 11,045 | 80,139 | 27,242 | 2021 |
| Semarang metropolitan area | Indonesia | 5,454 | 7,069,404 | 29,464 | 4,168 | 94,362 | 13,348 | 2023 |
| Makassar metropolitan area | Indonesia | 3,779 | 3,332,415 | 21,472 | 6,443 | 68,767 | 20,635 | 2023 |
| Johor Bahru Conurbation | Malaysia | 4,954 | 2,436,388 | 21,432 | 8,797 | 57,446 | 23,578 | 2020 |
| Batam metropolitan area | Indonesia | 3,433 | 1,917,952 | 18,484 | 9,637 | 59,196 | 30,864 | 2023 |
| Metro Davao | Philippines | 8,030 | 3,582,487 | 18,107 | 5,055 | 52,296 | 14,598 | 2023 |
| Malang metropolitan area | Indonesia | 3,836 | 3,801,089 | 15,873 | 4,176 | 50,837 | 13,374 | 2023 |
| Palembang metropolitan area | Indonesia | 9,887 | 2,683,669 | 15,433 | 5,750 | 49,426 | 18,417 | 2023 |
| Metro Cebu | Philippines | 1,063 | 3,165,799 | 15,329 | 4,842 | 44,273 | 13,985 | 2023 |
| Yangon Region | Myanmar | 10,277 | 7,360,510 | 14,986 | 2,036 | 54,809 | 7,451 | 2021 |
| Denpasar metropolitan area | Indonesia | 1,928 | 2,301,887 | 12,108 | 5,260 | 38,778 | 16,846 | 2023 |
| Surakarta metropolitan area | Indonesia | 1,343 | 2,414,666 | 10,117 | 4,190 | 32,402 | 13,419 | 2023 |

== By city proper ==
List ASEAN city proper by GDP (only above U$10 billion) by recent data.

| City | Country | Area (km^{2}) | Population | GDP Nominal | | GDP PPP | | Year | Source |
| City | Country | Area (km^{2}) | Population | (in million $) | Per capita | (in million $) | PPP Per Capita | Year | Source |
|---|---|---|---|---|---|---|---|---|---|
| Singapore | Singapore | 734 | 5,670,180 | 659,572 | 107,758 | 1,063,242 | 173,708 | 2025 | |
| Jakarta | Indonesia | 664 | 10,558,090 | 238,310 | 22,317 | 829,352 | 77,669 | 2025 | |
| Bangkok | Thailand | 1,569 | 9,034,000 | 180,663 | 19,810 | 580,672 | 64,051 | 2024 | |
| Manila | Philippines | 636 | 13,967,363 | 152.250 | 10,984 | 445,226 | 31,490 | 2025 | |
| Ho Chi Minh City | Vietnam | 6,773 | 13,467,600 | 119,030 | 8,775 | 385,403 | 28,237 | 2025 | |
| Kuala Lumpur | Malaysia | 243 | 2,079,259 | 74,794 | 33,831 | 235,382 | 106,542 | 2025 | |
| Hanoi | Vietnam | 3,360 | 8,330,800 | 63,557 | 7,175 | 203,498 | 23,470 | 2025 | |
| Surabaya | Indonesia | 351 | 2,921,661 | 48,689 | 16,665 | 162,594 | 55,651 | 2024 | |
| Haiphong | Vietnam | 3,195 | 4,061,900 | 29,458 | 7,787 | 94,319 | 25,750 | 2025 | |
| Bandung | Indonesia | 167 | 2,527,881 | 23,437 | 9,271 | 78,266 | 30,961 | 2024 | |
| Medan | Indonesia | 265 | 2,486,001 | 20,775 | 8,357 | 69,376 | 27,907 | 2024 | |
| Semarang | Indonesia | 374 | 1,708,634 | 16,863 | 9,869 | 56,314 | 32,958 | 2024 | |
| Makassar | Indonesia | 176 | 1,464,508 | 15,320 | 10,461 | 51,160 | 34,933 | 2024 | |
| Batam | Indonesia | 715 | 1,276,787 | 14,689 | 11,504 | 49,052 | 38,418 | 2024 | |
| Tangerang | Indonesia | 165 | 1,963,735 | 14,168 | 7,215 | 47,314 | 24,094 | 2024 | |
| George Town | Malaysia | 306 | 794,313 | 13,270 | 16,687 | 34,106 | 42,938 | 2021 | |
| Palembang | Indonesia | 353 | 1,718,251 | 13,122 | 7,637 | 43,821 | 25,503 | 2024 | |
| Danang | Vietnam | 11,860 | 2,771,300 | 12,666 | 4,287 | 36,941 | 14,291 | 2025 | |
| Seberang Perai | Malaysia | 748 | 946,092 | 12,520 | 12,180 | 29,650 | 31,339 | 2021 | |
| Pekanbaru | Indonesia | 632 | 1,026,556 | 10,797 | 10,517 | 36,056 | 35,123 | 2024 | |
| Davao City | Philippines | 2,444 | 1,848,947 | 10,697 | 5,785 | 31,662 | 17,124 | 2024 | |
| Kediri | Indonesia | 67 | 298,192 | 10,636 | 35,668 | 35,518 | 119,111 | 2024 | |

== See also ==
- List of ASEAN countries by GDP
  - List of Indonesian provinces by GDP
    - List of Indonesian cities by GDP
    - List of Indonesian regencies by GDP
  - List of Indonesian provinces by GDP per capita
  - List of Thai provinces by GPP
  - List of regions of the Philippines by GDP
  - List of Malaysian states by GDP
  - List of Vietnamese subdivisions by GDP
- List of ASEAN country and subdivisions by Wage
