= PGP =

PGP may refer to:

== Science and technology ==
- P-glycoprotein, a type of protein
- Pelvic girdle pain, a pregnancy discomfort
- Personal Genome Project, to sequence genomes and medical records
- Penultimate Glacial Period, the ice age from c. 194,000 to c. 135,000 years ago
- Pretty Good Privacy, a data encryption and authentication program

== Organizations ==
- PGP Corporation, a software company, part of Symantec, which bought the rights to Pretty Good Privacy
- Procter & Gamble Productions, former name of Procter & Gamble Entertainment
- PGP-RTB, a Yugoslav record label and chain record store (1958-1993)
- PGP-RTS, successor to PGP-RTB in Serbia

=== Politics ===
- Gabonese Party of Progress (Parti gabonais du progrès), a political party in Gabon
- Pacific Green Party, the Green Party of Oregon, USA
- Party for the Government of the People, a political party in Uruguay
- Galician Party of the Proletariat, a political party in Galicia, Spain
- Partido Galing at Puso, an independent coalition, political party in Philippines

== Language ==
- Preferred gender pronoun, third person individual gender pronouns

== Transport ==
- Perm Airlines, by ICAO code
- Punggol Point LRT station, by LRT station abbreviation

== Other uses ==
- PGP, a song by French rapper Booba, 2019
- PGP-RTS, a Serbian record label
- Post graduate program, especially in the Indian academic system

== See also ==
- PCP (disambiguation)
