= List of ASEAN countries and subdivisions by minimum wage =

This is a list of the official minimum wage rates of the Top 10 cities with the largest economies in ASEAN. Some cities may have a complicated minimum wage system. For example, in Vietnam, both Ho Chi Minh City and Hanoi has 2 types of minimum wage rates. Singapore and Metro Manila also has different types of minimum wage systems based on industries/services. Other cities from Indonesia and Malaysia have simple rate systems for minimum wages such as Jakarta, Kuala Lumpur, Surabaya, Bandung and Medan. In the table below, only the lowest minimum wage is cited.

== Methodology ==
The minimum wages listed refer to a gross amount, that is before deduction of taxes and social security contributions, which vary from one city to another. Also excluded from calculations are regulated paid days off, including public holidays, sick leave, annual leave and social insurance contributions paid by the employer. Converted local currency to US Dollar is calculated on the exchange rate of 1 January 2024 with the exception of Manila on 13 July 2024.

For comparison, an annual wage column is provided in international dollars, a hypothetical unit of currency calculated based on the purchasing power parity (PPP) of household final consumption expenditure. For calculating the annual wage, the lowest general minimum wage was used.

== Minimum wage by city proper ==
List minimum wage of Top 10 cities with the largest economies in ASEAN

City (Note: Based on the Bureau of Democracy, Human Rights and Labor, 1 week = 5 days = 40 Hours work and 1 year = 12 month)	Population estimates	Area (km^{2})	Per Hour			Per Month			Annual			Country	Year
City	Population estimates	Area (km^{2})	in local currency	in US$	PPP Int$	in local currency	in US$	PPP Int$	in local currency	in US$	PPP Int$	Country	Year
Singapore (Note: None. However, there are exception: Administration jobs have a minimum basic wage of S$1,500 (US$1,136) per month effective January 2024)	5,917,600	734.30	SGD 8.62	6.53	10.11	SGD 1,500	1,136	1,760	SGD 18,000	13,635	21,119	Singapore	2024
Jakarta	10,671,973	664.01	IDR 29,123	1.89	6.05	IDR 5,067,381	329	1,053	IDR 60,808,572	3,951	12,639	Indonesia	2024
Bangkok	9,063,316	1,568.73	THB 45.38	1.32	3.96	THB 7,895	230	689	THB 94,743	2,768	8,263	Thailand	2024
Manila (Note: The Minimum Wage on Sector/Industry: Agriculture, Plantation and Non-Plantation)	14,262,204	636.00	PHP 75.38	1.29	3.81	PHP 13,115	225	663	PHP 157,383	2,694	7,953	Philippines	2024
Ho Chi Minh City (Note: There are some districts in both Ho Chi Minh City and Hanoi that is included in Region II in Vietnam)	9,165,800	2,061.20	VND 25,345	1.04	3.06	VND 4,410,000	182	533	VND 52,920,000	2,181	6,392	Vietnam	2024
Kuala Lumpur	2,079,259	243.00	MYR 8.72	1.90	6.23	MYR 1,700	371	1,214	MYR 20,400	4,454	14,571	Malaysia	2025
Hanoi	8,330,800	3,359.82	VND 25,345	1.04	3.06	VND 4,410,000	182	533	VND 52,920,000	2,181	6,392	Vietnam	2024
Surabaya	2,911,427	350.56	IDR 27,158	1.76	5.17	IDR 4,720,542	307	900	IDR 56,705,748	3,685	10,801	Indonesia	2024
Bandung	2,507,137	167.31	IDR 24,191	1.57	4.61	IDR 4,209,309	274	802	IDR 50,511,708	3,282	9,621	Indonesia	2024
Medan	2,863,919	265.10	IDR 21,661	1.41	4.13	IDR 3,769,082	245	718	IDR 45,228,984	2,939	8,615	Indonesia	2024

== See also ==
- List of ASEAN country subdivisions by GDP
