= Grain per gallon =

Water hardness measurement

The grain per gallon (gpg) is a unit of water hardness defined as 1 grain (64.8 milligrams) of calcium carbonate dissolved in 1 US gallon of water (3.785412 L). It translates into 1 part in about 58,000 parts of water or 17.1 parts per million (ppm). Also called Clark degree (in terms of an imperial gallon).

== Usage ==
Calcium and magnesium ions present as sulfates, chlorides, carbonates and bicarbonates cause water to be hard. Water chemists measure water impurities in parts per million (ppm). For understandability, hardness ordinarily is expressed in grains of hardness per gallon of water (gpg). The two systems can be converted mathematically.

=== Measurement of water hardness ===
According to the Water Quality Association:

- soft: 0-3.5 grains per gallon (gpg)
- moderate: 3.5-7.0 gpg
- hard: 7.0-10.5 gpg
- very hard: over 10.5 gpg

== Conversions ==
- 1 gpg = 17.12 ppm = 17.12 mg/L = 0.01712 kg/m^{3}
- 1 mg/L (ppm) = 0.05842 gpg (grains per US gallon)
- 1 gpg = 1 pound per 7000 gallons
- 1 Clark degree = 0.8327 gpg
- 1 dGH = 1.0426 gpg

== See also ==
- dGH
