= CVV 2 Asiago =

Italian glider

Asiago

General information
- Type: Basic single seat glider
- National origin: Italy
- Manufacturer: Centro Volo a Vela, Milan (CVV)
- Designer: Ermenegildo Preti and Maurizio Garbell
- Number built: c.25

History
- First flight: 1937

The CVV 2 Asiago is a simple, single seat glider designed and built in Italy in the mid-1930s, the second of a series of gliders from the Milan Polytechnic and the first to go into production.

== Design and development ==
The Asiago was the second design from the Centro Volo a Vela (CVV), or Experimental Soaring Centre, of the Royal Polytechnic of Milan. It is a simple, all wood, short span, single seat glider with an open cockpit. It is cheap to buy and easy to rig, but it is capable of both soaring and aerobatics, particularly as an advanced trainer.

The Asiago has a simple, flat sided fuselage, hexagonal at the front and rectangular at the rear, plywood covered all over. The cockpit is immediately in front of the high wing, which is raised up on a pedestal so its leading edge is over the pilot's head. Particular attention was given to the seat, to minimise pilot fatigue on long flights. Aft, the pedestal drops away gradually and the fuselage tapers. The undercarriage consists of a fixed, semi-recessed monowheel with a tennis ball sprung skid ahead of it reaching to the nose, assisted by a very small tail bumper at the bottom of the rudder post.

The wing has a single box spar with spruce webs and ply caps. Plywood skin forward around the nose of the wing forms a D-shaped torsion box ahead of the spar and there is fabric covering aft, including the ailerons. In plan the wing centre section has constant chord; there are airbrakes which open above the wing only, placed immediately aft of the spar and about two-thirds the way out along this section. The outer wing panels are tapered on both edges and have semi-elliptical tips; ailerons, hinged parallel to the trailing edge fill these panels spanwise. On each side a single, faired, metal wing bracing strut runs from the lower fuselage longeron to the wing spar at about half centre section span. The horizontal tail is of similar construction to the wing and largely fabric covered, mounted on top of the fuselage far enough forward to place the trailing edge of the split elevator ahead of the rudder hinge. The fin is small and straight edged but the rudder, again fabric covered, is full and slightly curved; it is horn balanced and extends down to the keel.

The Asiago was designed during 1937 and probably flew for the first time that year. Serial production was undertaken by Aeronautica Lombarda, who built twenty five aircraft under the name GP.2 Asiago. The unit price in 1938 was $550 ex-Milan in 1938.

== Specifications ==
Data from Italian Vintage Sailplanes

General characteristics

- Crew: One
- Length: 6.50 m (21 ft 4 in)
- Wingspan: 13.70 m (44 ft 11 in)
- Wing area: 12.70 m^{2} (136.7 sq ft)
- Aspect ratio: 14
- Airfoil: Root Göttingen 535, tip NACA M6
- Empty weight: 130 kg (287 lb)
- Gross weight: 210 kg (463 lb)

Performance

- Maximum glide ratio: estimated 20:1
- Rate of sink: 0.79 m/s (156 ft/min)
- Wing loading: 16.50 kg/m^{2} (3.38 lb/sq ft)
