= Private product remaining =

Economic indicator

Private Product Remaining (PPR) is a means of national income accounting similar to the more commonly encountered GNP. Since government is financed through taxation and any resulting output is not (usually) sold on the market, what value is ascribed to it is disputed (see calculation problem), and it is counted in GNP. Murray Rothbard developed the GPP (Gross Private Product) and PPR measures. GPP is GNP minus income originating in government and government enterprises. PPR is GPP minus the higher of government expenditures and tax revenues plus interest received.

$PPR = C + I - G + (X - M) \,$

- C is the private consumption
- I is the Investments
- G is Government Spending
- X is Exports
- M is Imports

For example, in an economy in which the private expenditures total $1,000 and government expenditures total $200, the GNP would be $1,200, GPP would be $1,000, and PPR would be $800.

== See also ==
- Gross Domestic Product
