= List of Thai provinces by GPP =

This is a list of Thai provinces and regions by GDP and GDP per capita as of 2019, based on Gross

GDP per capita

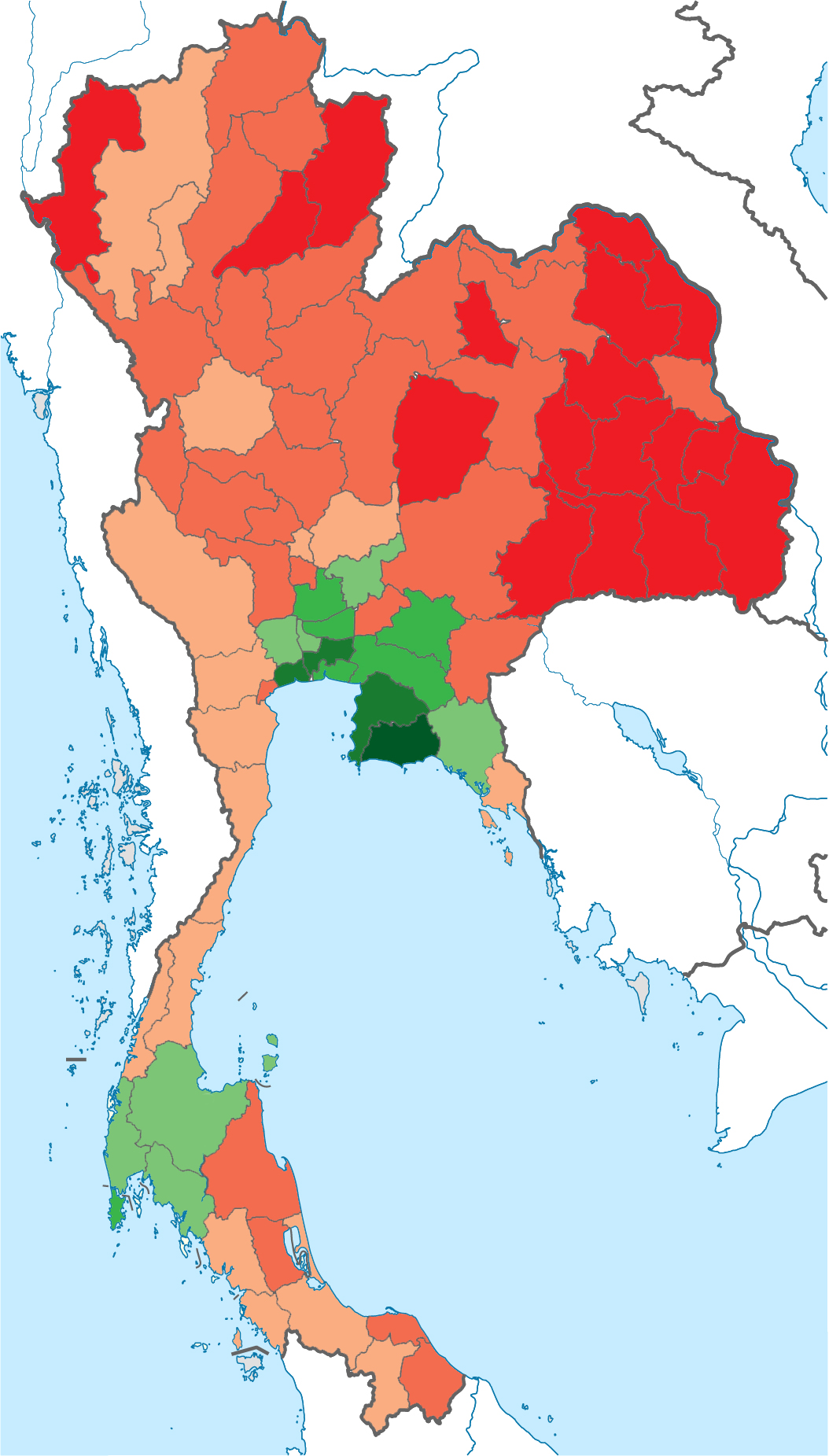
Thai provinces by GDP per capita in 2011.

National average is 5,362 US$ (13,299 I$).

< 1,500 US$ (3,720 I$)
1,500 - < 3,000 US$ (3,720 - < 7440 I$)
3,000 - < 5,362 US$ (7440 - < 13,299 I$)
5,362 - < 10,000 US$ (13,299 - < 24,801 I$)
10,000 - < 15,000 US$ (24,801 - < 37,202 I$)
15,000 - < 20,000 US$ (37,202 - < 49,603 I$)
> 20,000 US$ (> 49,603 I$)
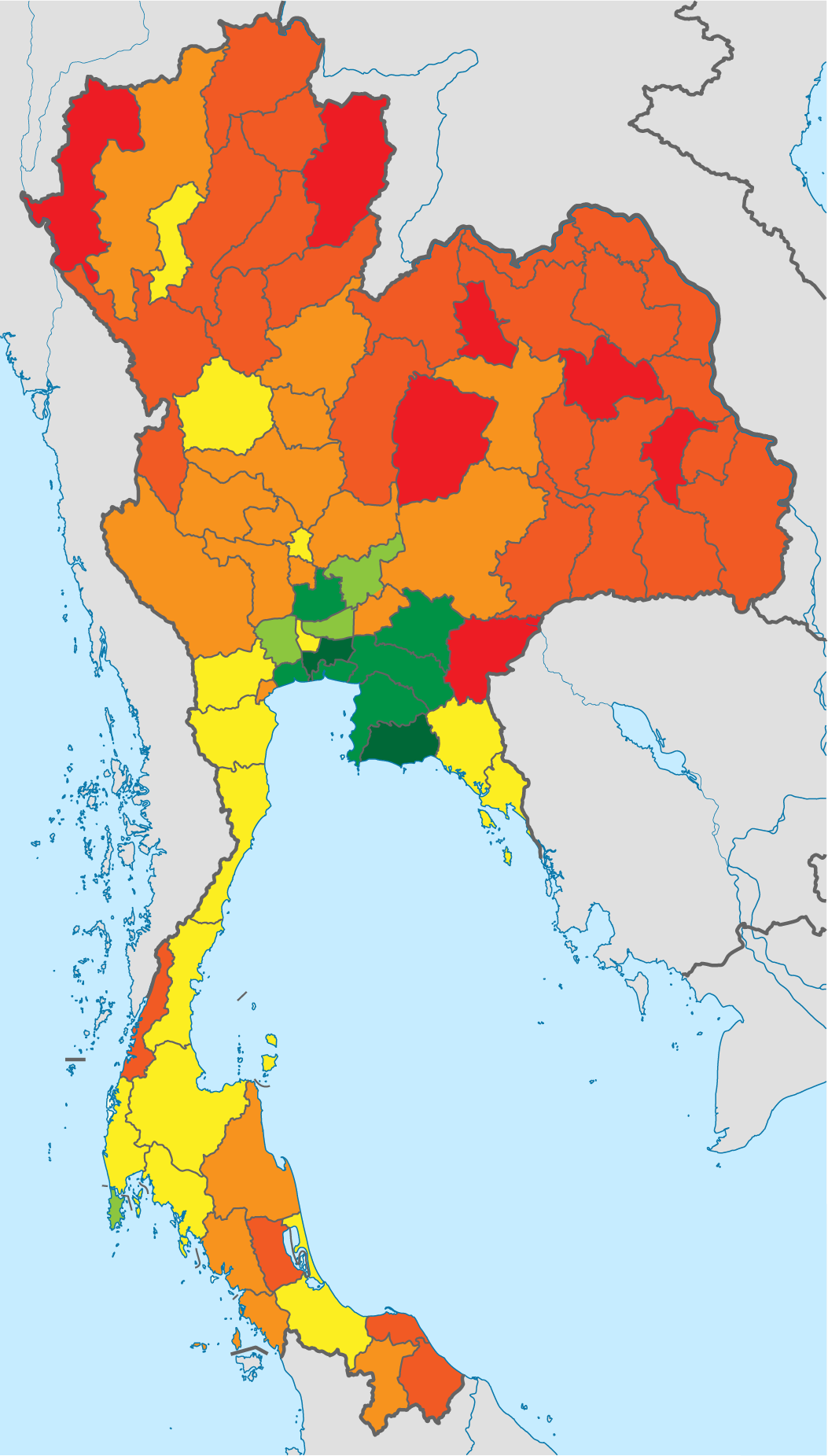
Thai provinces by GDP per capita in 2013.

National average is 6,293 US$ (15,672 I$).

< 2,000 US$ (4,981 I$)
2,000 - < 3,000 US$ (4,981 - < 7,471 I$)
3,000 - < 4,000 US$ (7,471 - < 9,961 I$)
4,000 - < 6,293 US$ (9,961 - < 15,672 I$)
6,293 - < 10,000 US$ (15,672 - < 24,903 I$)
10,000 - < 15,000 US$ (24,903 - < 37,354 I$)
> 15,000 US$ (> 37,354 I$)
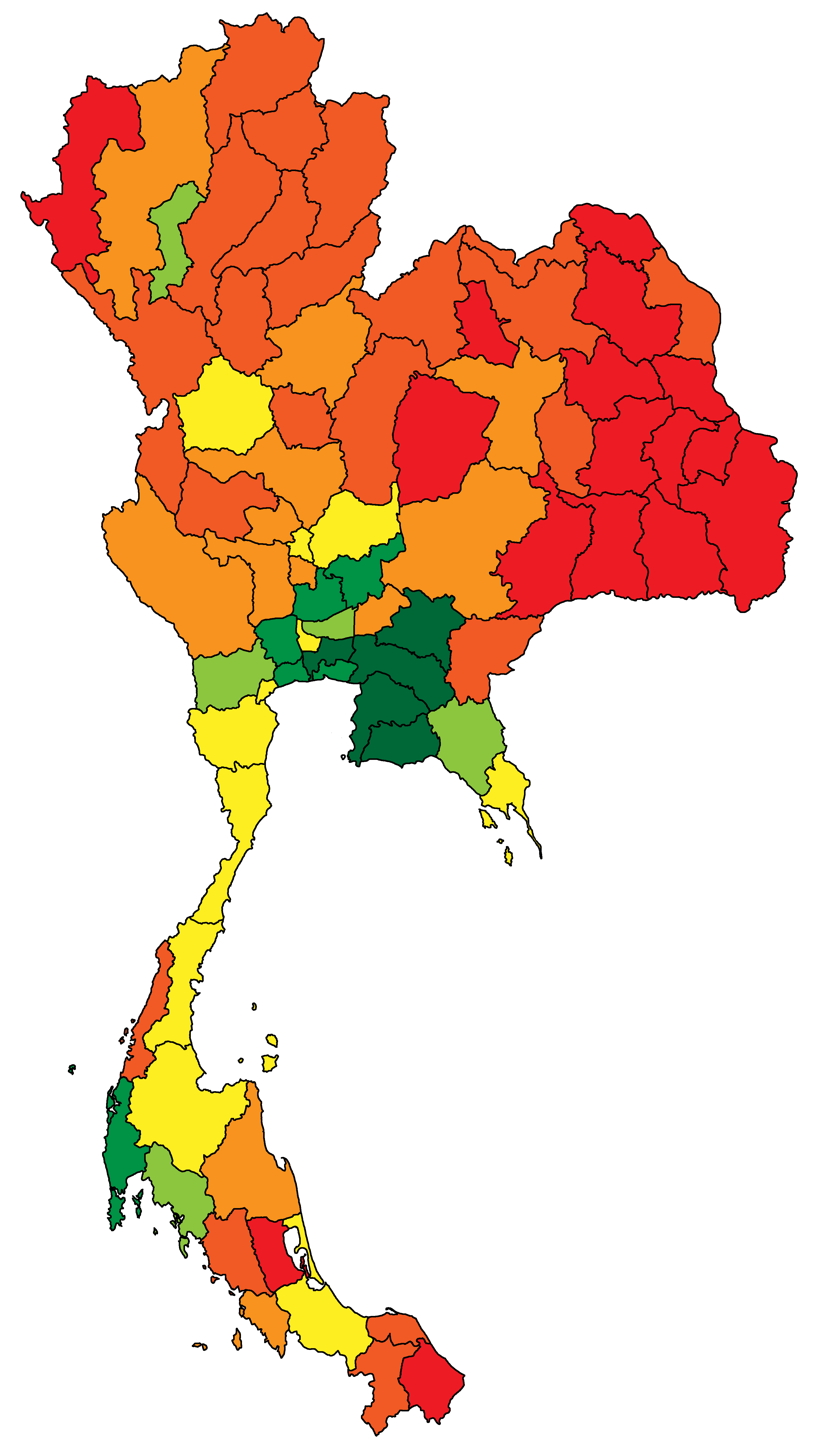
Thai provinces by GDP per capita in 2019.

National average is 7,813 US$

< 2,000 US$ (4,981 I$)
2,000 - < 3,000 US$ (4,981 - < 7,471 I$)
3,000 - < 4,000 US$ (7,471 - < 9,961 I$)
4,000 - < 6,293 US$ (9,961 - < 15,672 I$)
6,293 - < 10,000 US$ (15,672 - < 24,903 I$)
10,000 - < 15,000 US$ (24,903 - < 37,354 I$)
> 15,000 US$ (> 37,354 I$)
Regional and Provincial Product Chain Volume Measures 2019 Edition, According to Office of the National Economic and Social Development Council (NESDC).

Data for 2019 estimates (US$ at 2019 average market exchange rate, international $ (I$) using 2019 PPP conversion factor from World Bank)

== Tables ==
=== By 7 regions classification ===
ID	Region	Population (millions)	GPP (billions ฿)	% of national GDP	GPP (billions US$ nominal)	GPP (billions I$ PPP)	GPP per capita (฿)	GPP per capita (US$ nominal)	GPP per capita (I$ PPP)
0700	Bangkok Metropolitan Region	16.932	7,167.11	47.50	258.90	647.25	449,881	15,800	44,240
0600	Central Thailand	3.176	838.31	6.12	27.80	69.55	267,162	9,045	25,326
0400	Eastern Thailand	6.056	2,857.30	18.02	98.20	245.50	500,676	16,749	46,897
0100	Northeastern Thailand	18.523	1,496.07	9.44	51.50	128.75	80,352	2,872	7,916
0200	Northern Thailand	11.422	1,182.87	7.69	41.90	104.75	103,760	3,810	10,668
0300	Southern Thailand	9.590	1,371.18	8.37	45.60	114.00	148,067	5,122	14,342
0500	Western Thailand	3.665	539.11	3.54	19.30	48.25	149,827	5,438	15,226
0000	Thailand	69.315	15,451.96	100.00	545.00	1,342.20	228,398	7,864	19,276

=== By 4 regions classification ===
Region	Population (millions)	GPP (billions ฿)	% of national GDP	GPP (billions US$ nominal)	GPP (billions I$ PPP)	GPP per capita (฿)	GPP per capita (US$ nominal)	GPP per capita (I$ PPP)
Central Thailand	29.626	11,401.82	73.79	391.64	895.92	384,859	13,219	30,241
Northeastern Thailand	18.828	1,496.05	9.68	50.3	125.91	79,459	2,672	6,687
Northern Thailand	11.6	1,182.90	7.66	40.81	102	101,974	3,518	8,793
Southern Thailand	9.603	1,371.19	8.87	45.28	114.33	142,788	4,715	11,906
Thailand	69.315	15,451.96	100.00	545.00	1,342.20	228,398	7,864	19,276

=== By Province ===
ID	Province	Region	Population (millions)	GPP (billions ฿)	% of national GDP	GPP (billions US$ nominal)	GPP (billions I$ PPP)	GPP per capita (฿)	GPP per capita (US$ nominal)	GPP per capita (I$ PPP)
0701	Bangkok	Bangkok Metropolitan Region	8.912	5,022.02	31.88	173.76	434.4	573,907	19,749	55,297
0702	Samut Prakan	Bangkok Metropolitan Region	2.171	717.05	4.71	25.69	64.22	343,215	12,176	34,092
0703	Pathum Thani	Bangkok Metropolitan Region	1.729	380.69	2.39	13.02	32.55	254,627	8,039	22,509
0704	Samut Sakhon	Bangkok Metropolitan Region	1.042	398.10	2.40	13.10	32.75	411,326	12,914	36,159
0705	Nakhon Pathom	Bangkok Metropolitan Region	1.186	332.63	2.06	11.26	28.15	308,167	10,074	28,207
0706	Nonthaburi	Bangkok Metropolitan Region	1.722	316.63	1.92	10.49	26.22	204,404	6,513	18,236
0601	Saraburi	Central Thailand	0.758	236.64	1.45	7.93	18.82	330,750	10,844	30,363
0602	Sing Buri	Central Thailand	0.190	26.50	0.16	0.89	2.22	129,095	5,146	14,409
0603	Chainat	Central Thailand	0.314	31.85	0.20	1.13	2.89	101,282	4,316	12,089
0604	Ang Thong	Central Thailand	0.259	27.79	0.18	0.99	2.47	107,129	4,390	12,292
0605	Lopburi	Central Thailand	0.777	111.92	0.66	3.58	8.98	144,041	5,045	14,126
0606	Phra Nakhon Si Ayutthaya	Central Thailand	0.907	403.60	2.38	13.31	33.27	465,972	14,988	41,966
0401	Chonburi	Eastern Thailand	1.819	976.46	6.10	33.25	83..12	581,475	18,550	51,940
0402	Chachoengsao	Eastern Thailand	0.823	341.12	2.29	12.47	31.17	427,409	15,453	43,268
0403	Rayong	Eastern Thailand	0.980	984.98	6.12	33.73	84.32	1,095,667	34,995	97,986
0404	Trat	Eastern Thailand	0.274	46.96	0.25	1.38	3.45	171,189	5,637	15,784
0405	Chanthaburi	Eastern Thailand	0.553	138.44	0.75	4.08	11.11	254,582	7,423	20,784
0406	Nakhon Nayok	Eastern Thailand	0.278	26.84	0.18	0.96	2.40	96,589	4,217	11,808
0407	Prachinburi	Eastern Thailand	0.621	297.25	1.89	10.29	25.72	486,601	16,862	47,214
0408	Sa Kaeo	Eastern Thailand	0.630	45.25	0.34	1.63	4.07	72,555	3,170	8,876
0101	Khon Kaen	Northeastern Thailand	1.736	204.12	1.25	6.81	17.02	117,560	4,466	12,505
0102	Udon Thani	Northeastern Thailand	1.255	111.26	0.66	3.60	9.00	88,673	3,344	9,363
0103	Loei	Northeastern Thailand	0.543	52.67	0.33	1.78	4.45	97,903	3,751	10,503
0104	Nong Khai	Northeastern Thailand	0.456	40.05	0.26	1.37	3.42	89,913	3,494	9,783
0105	Mukdahan	Northeastern Thailand	0.345	25.80	0.17	0.82	2.07	74,729	2,524	7,067
0106	Nakhon Phanom	Northeastern Thailand	0.564	42.89	0.28	1.43	3.57	76,000	3,142	8,798
0107	Sakon Nakhon	Northeastern Thailand	0.925	55.63	0.36	1.91	4.77	68,887	2,567	7,188
0108	Kalasin	Northeastern Thailand	0.914	55.84	0.36	1.91	4.77	61,084	2,887	8,084
0109	Nakhon Ratchasima	Northeastern Thailand	2.515	274.90	1.75	9.53	23.82	110,301	4,290	12,012
0110	Chaiyaphum	Northeastern Thailand	0.954	60.09	0.39	2.12	5.30	63,010	2,749	7,697
0111	Yasothon	Northeastern Thailand	0.481	26.04	0.17	0.90	2.25	54,183	2,437	6,824
0112	Ubon Ratchathani	Northeastern Thailand	1.738	120.49	0.73	4.00	10.00	70,551	2,805	7,854
0113	Roi Et	Northeastern Thailand	1.069	73.48	0.48	2.43	6.07	68,751	2,883	8,072
0114	Buriram	Northeastern Thailand	1.247	84.33	0.55	2.66	6.65	67,621	2,665	7,462
0115	Surin	Northeastern Thailand	1.107	72.88	0.47	2.44	6.10	65,810	2,776	7,772
0116	Maha Sarakham	Northeastern Thailand	0.826	56.00	0.36	1.92	4.80	67,784	3,082	8,630
0117	Sisaket	Northeastern Thailand	1.033	69.57	0.45	2.33	5.82	67,362	2,885	8,078
0118	Nong Bua Lamphu	Northeastern Thailand	0.478	25.19	0.16	0.94	2.35	53,416	2,460	6,888
0119	Amnat Charoen	Northeastern Thailand	0.282	17.65	0.11	0.60	1.50	63,860	2,717	7,608
0120	Bueng Kan	Northeastern Thailand	0.360	27.17	0.18	0.80	2.18	78,022	2,676	7,493
0201	Chiang Mai	Northern Thailand	1.805	231.73	1.47	7.99	19.97	135,991	4,873	13,644
0202	Lampang	Northern Thailand	0.735	68.20	0.42	2.32	5.80	92,749	3,707	10,380
0203	Uttaradit	Northern Thailand	0.433	38.11	0.25	1.26	3.15	87,982	3,502	9,806
0204	Mae Hong Son	Northern Thailand	0.235	13.00	0.08	0.44	1.10	65,448	2,358	6,602
0205	Chiang Rai	Northern Thailand	1.156	104.44	0.65	3.57	8.92	91,308	3,553	9,948
0206	Phrae	Northern Thailand	0.423	28.38	0.18	0.98	2.45	67,057	3,120	8,736
0207	Lamphun	Northern Thailand	0.406	77.85	0.50	2.72	6.80	191,568	7,235	20,258
0208	Nan	Northern Thailand	0.445	31.31	0.20	1.09	2.72	71,121	3,031	8,487
0209	Phayao	Northern Thailand	0.410	36.02	0.23	1.20	3.00	87,858	3,598	10,074
0210	Nakhon Sawan	Northern Thailand	0.975	107.18	0.69	3.74	9.35	109,977	4,444	12,443
0211	Phitsanulok	Northern Thailand	0.896	93.05	0.59	3.23	8.07	104,175	4,062	11,374
0212	Kamphaeng Phet	Northern Thailand	0.781	110.25	0.71	3.80	9.50	142,660	5,302	14,846
0213	Uthai Thani	Northern Thailand	0.292	28.59	0.19	0.96	2.40	97,948	3,887	10,884
0214	Sukhothai	Northern Thailand	0.616	45.15	0.29	1.62	4.05	73,251	3,216	9,005
0215	Tak	Northern Thailand	0.532	47.80	0.31	1.69	4.22	94,902	3,653	10,228
0216	Phichit	Northern Thailand	0.539	45.04	0.29	1.56	3.90	83,504	3,470	9,716
0217	Phetchabun	Northern Thailand	0.921	76.80	0.50	2.64	6.60	84,058	3,333	9,332
0301	Phuket	Southern Thailand	0.580	209.01	1.38	7.54	18.85	388,559	13,351	37,383
0302	Surat Thani	Southern Thailand	1.134	211.05	1.22	6.67	16.94	200,471	6,307	17,660
0303	Ranong	Southern Thailand	0.269	26.77	0.17	0.90	2.25	104,517	3,811	10,678
0304	Phang Nga	Southern Thailand	0.270	71.76	0.46	2.53	6.32	265,768	10,497	29,392
0305	Krabi	Southern Thailand	0.418	89.70	0.58	2.79	6.97	239,309	7,105	19,894
0306	Chumphon	Southern Thailand	0.498	79.40	0.51	2.83	7.07	161,626	6,111	17,111
0307	Nakhon Si Thammarat	Southern Thailand	1.537	153.57	0.97	5.30	13.25	99,899	4,042	11,267
0308	Songkhla	Southern Thailand	1.635	241.84	1.47	8.01	20.02	156,245	5,338	14,946
0309	Satun	Southern Thailand	0.290	36.56	0.24	1.00	2.99	129,565	4,023	11,264
0310	Yala	Southern Thailand	0.468	43.37	0.28	1.39	3.47	96,867	3,424	9,587
0311	Trang	Southern Thailand	0.630	73.20	0.47	2.08	5.20	116,394	3,767	10,548
0312	Narathiwat	Southern Thailand	0.721	42.74	0.28	1.44	3.60	61,765	2,476	6,933
0313	Phattalung	Southern Thailand	0.512	36.48	0.24	1.16	2.93	71,298	2,831	7,927
0314	Pattani	Southern Thailand	0.641	55.74	0.36	1.64	4.47	88,442	3,010	8,428
0501	Ratchaburi	Western Thailand	0.813	172.59	1.12	6.12	15.30	214,742	8,028	22,478
0502	Kanchanaburi	Western Thailand	0.829	97.29	0.63	3.46	8.65	121,570	4,617	12,928
0503	Prachuap Khiri Khan	Western Thailand	0.488	92.11	0.60	3.01	7.52	198,434	6,592	18,458
0504	Phetchaburi	Western Thailand	0.499	68.49	0.44	2.32	5.80	143,460	5,098	14,274
0505	Suphan Buri	Western Thailand	0.862	86.74	0.56	2.95	7.37	100,595	4,014	11,239
0506	Samut Songkhram	Western Thailand	0.190	21.88	0.14	0.84	2.10	114,990	5,048	14,134
0000	Thailand	—	69.315	15,451.96	100.00	545.00	1,342.20	228,398	7,864	19,276

== See also ==
- List of ASEAN country subdivisions by GDP
