= Locus Reference Genomic =

Locus Reference Genomic (LRG) is a DNA sequence format that was developed to aid in curating locus specific databases (LSDBs) that record DNA sequence variation which can result in inherited diseases. LRGs have fixed sequences that are independent of the genome so that they provide a stable framework for reporting variants. The LRG format uses extensible markup language (XML) to provide highly structured single records containing the genomic DNA sequence for individual genes along with the mRNAs and proteins encoded by these genes. LRG records are recommended in the Human Genome Variation Society Nomenclature guidelines as reference sequences to report sequence variants in LSDBs and the literature.

The LRG concept was developed by the GEN2PHEN project in conjunction with the European Bioinformatics Institute (EBI) and the National Center for Biotechnology Information (NCBI).

The LRG homepage provides access to existing LRG sequences and allows the submission of requests for the creation of new LRGs. This page also has a frequently asked questions (FAQs) section.
