= List of largest cities of U.S. states and territories by population =

This is a list of the five most populous incorporated places and the capital city (if not one of those five places) in all 50 U.S. states, the District of Columbia, and the 5 inhabited territories of the United States, as of July 1, 2025, as estimated by the United States Census Bureau.

State, federal district, or territory	State, federal district, or territory population	Most populous		2nd most populous		3rd most populous		4th most populous		5th most populous		Capital (if not otherwise listed)	
State, federal district, or territory	State, federal district, or territory population	Name	Population	Name	Population	Name	Population	Name	Population	Name	Population	Name	Population
Alabama	5,193,088	Huntsville	233,627	Mobile	200,824	Birmingham	195,893	Montgomery	195,300	Tuscaloosa	114,316		
Alaska	737,270	Anchorage	287,155	Juneau	31,609	Fairbanks	31,468	Wasilla	10,556	Sitka	8,319		
American Samoa	49,710	Tafuna	7,988	Nuʻuuli	4,991	'Ili'ili	3,073	Pago Pago	3,000	Pava'ia'i	2,112	(Note: Although Pago Pago is the capital of American Samoa, Fagatogo (population 1,445) is the seat of government.)	
Arizona	7,623,818	Phoenix	1,665,481	Tucson	548,371	Mesa	513,656	Gilbert	287,285	Chandler	278,748		
Arkansas	3,114,791	Little Rock	206,427	Fayetteville	106,623	Fort Smith	90,855	Springdale	90,685	Jonesboro	83,296		
California	39,355,309	Los Angeles	3,869,089	San Diego	1,406,106	San Jose	989,814	San Francisco	826,079	Fresno	555,549	Sacramento (6)	536,449
Colorado	6,012,561	Denver	740,613	Colorado Springs	494,743	Aurora	410,053	Fort Collins	171,500	Lakewood	156,927		
Connecticut	3,688,496	Bridgeport	152,273	Stamford	139,535	New Haven	138,774	Hartford	121,981	Waterbury	115,771		
Delaware	1,059,952	Wilmington	73,512	Dover	40,592	Newark	30,359	Middletown	25,798	Milford	14,723		
District of Columbia	693,645	Washington, D.C.	693,645										
Florida	23,462,518	Jacksonville	1,017,689	Miami	489,812	Tampa	413,554	Orlando	333,888	Port St. Lucie	268,062	Tallahassee (9)	204,902
Georgia	11,302,748	Atlanta	529,110	Columbus	202,171	Augusta	201,999	Macon	157,556	Savannah	149,440		
Guam	153,836	Dededo	44,908	Yigo	19,339	Tamuning	18,489	Mangilao	13,476	Barrigada	7,956	Hagåtña (18)	943
Hawaii	1,432,820	Honolulu^{1}	341,868	East Honolulu ^{1}	50,922	Pearl City^{1}	45,295	Hilo^{1}	44,186	Waipahu^{1}	43,485		
Idaho	2,029,733	Boise	238,429	Meridian	142,988	Nampa	120,384	Caldwell	76,629	Idaho Falls	71,785		
Illinois	12,719,141	Chicago	2,731,585	Aurora	181,505	Naperville	153,114	Joliet	152,241	Rockford	147,384	Springfield (7)	112,989
Indiana	6,973,333	Indianapolis	901,116	Fort Wayne	275,203	Evansville	116,176	Carmel	105,634	Fishers	104,812		
Iowa	3,238,387	Des Moines	212,086	Cedar Rapids	137,935	Davenport	100,358	Sioux City	86,356	Ankeny	77,833		
Kansas	2,977,220	Wichita	400,987	Overland Park	203,677	Kansas City	157,805	Olathe	150,025	Topeka	125,795		
Kentucky	4,606,864	Louisville	641,962	Lexington	329,751	Bowling Green	78,505	Owensboro	60,892	Covington	41,847	Frankfort (14)	28,657
Louisiana	4,618,189	New Orleans	362,154	Baton Rouge	222,795	Shreveport	175,902	Lafayette	123,311	Lake Charles	82,676		
Maine	1,414,874	Portland	69,911	Lewiston	38,866	Bangor	32,518	South Portland	27,007	Auburn	25,441	Augusta (14)	19,155
Maryland	6,265,347	Baltimore	569,997	Frederick	92,059	Gaithersburg	71,113	Rockville	67,563	Bowie	58,383	Annapolis (7)	40,634
Massachusetts	7,154,084	Boston	672,973	Worcester	213,862	Springfield	154,702	Cambridge	122,588	Lowell	119,971		
Michigan	10,127,884	Detroit	649,095	Grand Rapids	201,183	Warren	137,138	Sterling Heights	133,931	Ann Arbor	122,233	Lansing (6)	113,884
Minnesota	5,830,405	Minneapolis	430,324	Saint Paul	306,684	Rochester	124,292	Bloomington	89,034	Duluth	88,330		
Mississippi	2,954,160	Jackson	141,196	Gulfport	76,506	Southaven	57,819	Hattiesburg	48,802	Biloxi	48,516		
Missouri	6,270,541	Kansas City	521,220	Saint Louis	278,144	Springfield	169,847	Columbia	130,851	Independence	121,675	Jefferson City (16)	42,489
Montana	1,144,694	Billings	121,239	Missoula	78,903	Great Falls	60,208	Bozeman	58,814	Butte	35,469	Helena (6)	35,138
Nebraska	2,018,006	Omaha	488,797	Lincoln	301,522	Bellevue	64,863	Grand Island	53,943	Kearney	34,782		
Nevada	3,282,188	Las Vegas	679,817	Henderson	353,289	North Las Vegas	296,653	Reno	283,621	Sparks	111,902	Carson City (6)	58,571
New Hampshire	1,415,342	Manchester	116,818	Nashua	92,435	Concord	44,597	Dover	34,623	Derry	33,990		
New Jersey	9,548,215	Newark	323,808	Jersey City	302,013	Paterson	161,793	Lakewood	143,765	Elizabeth	141,675	Trenton (10)	91,506
New Mexico	2,125,498	Albuquerque	556,588	Las Cruces	116,978	Rio Rancho	114,419	Santa Fe	89,837	Roswell	46,878		
New York	20,002,427	New York	8,584,629	Buffalo	274,613	Yonkers	212,603	Rochester	206,108	Syracuse	144,896	Albany (6)	101,698
North Carolina	11,197,968	Charlotte	964,784	Raleigh	506,306	Greensboro	308,667	Durham	305,561	Winston-Salem	257,271		
North Dakota	799,358	Fargo	136,275	Bismarck	77,963	Grand Forks	60,365	Minot	47,308	West Fargo	41,175		
Northern Mariana Islands	47,329	Saipan^{2}	43,385	Tinian^{2}	2,044	Rota^{2}	1,893	Northern Islands^{2}	7				
Ohio	11,900,510	Columbus	938,396	Cleveland	363,608	Cincinnati	314,367	Toledo	263,423	Akron	189,691		
Oklahoma	4,123,288	Oklahoma City	719,849	Tulsa	416,209	Norman	130,943	Broken Arrow	124,991	Edmond	100,479		
Oregon	4,273,586	Portland	635,109	Salem	181,779	Eugene	178,618	Gresham	111,513	Hillsboro	111,126		
Pennsylvania	13,059,432	Philadelphia	1,574,281	Pittsburgh	307,632	Allentown	126,044	Reading	95,832	Erie	91,838	Harrisburg (9)	50,522
Puerto Rico	3,184,835	San Juan	329,737	Bayamón	180,562	Carolina	149,874	Ponce	128,384	Caguas	124,161		
Rhode Island	1,114,521	Providence	195,310	Cranston	84,647	Warwick	84,187	Pawtucket	77,065	East Providence	48,249		
South Carolina	5,570,274	Charleston	159,423	Columbia	147,035	North Charleston	129,245	Mount Pleasant	95,469	Rock Hill	75,911		
South Dakota	935,094	Sioux Falls	213,748	Rapid City	80,589	Aberdeen	27,961	Brookings	25,355	Watertown	23,736	Pierre (11)	13,848
Tennessee	7,315,076	Nashville	721,074	Memphis	609,647	Knoxville	202,021	Chattanooga	194,144	Clarksville	188,829		
Texas	31,709,821	Houston	2,397,315	San Antonio	1,548,422	Dallas	1,329,491	Fort Worth	1,028,117	Austin	1,002,632		
Utah	3,538,904	Salt Lake City	218,428	West Valley City	137,491	West Jordan	116,812	Provo	114,527	St. George	108,713		
Vermont	644,663	Burlington	44,019	South Burlington	21,394	Colchester	17,565	Rutland	15,363	Bennington	14,953	Montpelier (18)	7,823
(United States Virgin Islands) Virgin Islands (U.S.)	87,146	Charlotte Amalie^{3}	14,477	Sion Farm^{3}	10,332	Northside^{3}	8,889	East End^{3}	7,502	Southcentral^{3}	7,415		
Virginia	8,880,107	Virginia Beach	453,737	Chesapeake	255,332	Richmond	237,257	Norfolk	231,013	Newport News	183,230		
Washington	8,001,020	Seattle	784,777	Spokane	230,783	Tacoma	229,816	Vancouver	199,698	Bellevue	154,193	Olympia (24)	56,724
West Virginia	1,766,147	Charleston	46,117	Huntington	44,815	Morgantown	30,293	Parkersburg	28,593	Wheeling	25,680		
Wisconsin	5,972,787	Milwaukee	562,407	Madison	286,233	Green Bay	106,675	Kenosha	99,239	Racine	77,908		
Wyoming	588,753	Cheyenne	66,507	Casper	58,771	Gillette	34,024	Laramie	32,284	Rock Springs	22,936		

== Census-designated places on the list ==
Note 1: The only incorporated place in Hawaii is the City & County of Honolulu. A portion of it, the Honolulu District, is sometimes regarded as the "city" for statistical purposes, although it has no government separate from that of the City and County as a whole. The U.S. Census Bureau defines Honolulu CDP (census-designated place) to coincide with the Honolulu District. Thus for Hawaii, the largest CDPs are ranked, as of the 2020 United States census.

Note 2: The 4 municipalities of the Northern Mariana Islands are listed. Each municipality is divided into smaller villages, but the municipalities are considered the primary subdivisions (as in how Saipan is usually listed as the capital rather than Capitol Hill, Saipan). The five largest villages are Garapan (3,096), Dandan (2,922), Finasisu (2,566), Koblerville (2,470), and Kagman III (2,144), with Capitol Hill being the 16th largest village at 979 people.

Note 3: The most populous sub-districts of the U.S. Virgin Islands (as defined by the U.S. Census Bureau) are listed. The three towns are Charlotte Amalie (8,194), Christiansted (1,770) and Frederiksted (528).

== See also ==
- United States of America
  - Outline of the United States
  - Index of United States-related articles
  - United States Census Bureau
    - Demographics of the United States
    - Urbanization in the United States
    - List of US states and territories by population
    - List of US cities by population
    - List of largest cities of U.S. states and territories by historical population
- Office of Management and Budget
  - Statistical area (United States)
    - Combined statistical area (list)
    - Core-based statistical area (list)
      - Metropolitan statistical area (list, by GDP)
      - Micropolitan statistical area (list)
- Largest cities in the United States by population by decade
- List of cities proper by population (most populous cities in the world)
- List of largest cities in the Midwestern United States by population
- List of lists of settlements in the United States
- List of United States cities by population density
- List of United States urban areas
