= List of largest cities of U.S. states and territories by historical population =

This is a list of the largest cities in each U.S. state and territory by historical population, as enumerated every decade by the United States Census, starting with the 1790 Census. Data for the tables below is drawn from U.S. Census Bureau reports. For the 1990 Census and earlier, the primary resource is the 2005 Working Paper number POP-WP076. Post-1990 data, as well as data for territories, is drawn from the respective year's Census. Some locales may have pre-existed their first appearance in the U.S. Census, but such values are not included here, unless otherwise noted.

Total population counts for the Censuses of 1790 through 1860 include both free and enslaved persons. Native Americans were not identified in the Census of 1790 through 1840 and only sporadically from 1850 until 1890 if they lived outside of Indian Territory or off reservations. Beginning with the 1900 census, Native Americans were fully enumerated along with the general population. Shaded areas of the tables indicate census years when a territory or the part of another state had not yet been admitted as a new state. (Note: As the Federal District, the District of Columbia is not shaded.)

== 1790–1830 ==
State, federal district, or territory	1790		1800		1810		1820		1830	
State, federal district, or territory	Name	Pop.	Name	Pop.	Name	Pop.	Name	Pop.	Name	Pop.
Alabama	—		—		—		Mobile	1,500	Mobile	3,194
Connecticut	New Haven	4,487	New London	5,150	New Haven	5,772	New Haven	7,147	New Haven	10,180
Delaware	—		—		—		Wilmington	5,268	Wilmington	6,628
District of Columbia (Note: In 1846, Alexandria County, including the city of Alexandria, was retroceded to Virginia.)	—		Alexandria	4,971	Washington City	8,208	Washington City	13,247	Washington City	18,826
Florida	—		—		—		—		St. Augustine	2,544
Georgia	—		Savannah	5,146	Savannah	5,215	Savannah	7,523	Savannah	7,303
Illinois	—		—		—		—		Quincy	300
Indiana	—		—		—		—		New Albany	2,079
Kentucky	Lexington	834	Lexington	1,795	Lexington	4,326	Louisville	4,012	Louisville	10,341
Louisiana	—		—		New Orleans (Note: Territory of Orleans)	17,242	New Orleans	27,176	New Orleans	46,082
Maine (Note: Between 1790 and 1820, the District of Maine was part of the state of Massachusetts.)	—		Portland	3,822	Portland	7,169	Portland	8,581	Portland	12,598
Maryland	Baltimore	13,503	Baltimore	26,514	Baltimore	46,555	Baltimore	62,738	Baltimore	80,620
Massachusetts	Boston	18,320	Boston	24,937	Boston	33,787	Boston	43,298	Boston	61,392
Michigan	—		—		—		Detroit	1,422	Detroit	2,222
Mississippi	—		—		Natchez	1,511	Natchez	2,184	Natchez	2,789
Missouri	—		—		—		—		St. Louis	4,977
New Hampshire	Portsmouth	4,720	Portsmouth	5,339	Portsmouth	6,934	Portsmouth	7,327	Portsmouth	8,026
New Jersey	—		—		Trenton	3,000	Trenton	3,942	Newark	10,953
New York	New York City (Note: Prior to 1874, New York City consisted only of the island of Manhattan.)	33,131	New York City	60,515	New York City	96,373	New York City	123,706	New York City	202,589
North Carolina	—		New Bern	2,467	— (Note: No city-level data for North Carolina reported in 1810.)		New Bern	3,663	New Bern	3,796
Ohio	—		Cincinnati	850	Cincinnati	2,540	Cincinnati	9,642	Cincinnati	24,831
Pennsylvania	Philadelphia (Note: Before 1854, Philadelphia refers to the modern-day Center City section of the city.)	28,522	Philadelphia	41,220	Philadelphia	53,722	Philadelphia	63,802	Philadelphia	93,665
Rhode Island	Newport	6,716	Providence	7,614	Providence	11,767	Providence	11,767	Providence	16,833
South Carolina	Charleston	16,359	Charleston	18,824	Charleston	24,711	Charleston	24,780	Charleston	30,289
Tennessee	—		—		Nashville	2,490	Nashville	3,410	Nashville	5,566
Vermont	Guilford	2,422	Guilford	2,257	Bennington	2,524	Bennington	2,485	Burlington	3,526
Virginia	Richmond	3,761	Norfolk	6,926	Richmond	9,735	Richmond	12,067	Richmond	16,060

== 1840–1880 ==
State, federal district, or territory	1840		1850		1860		1870		1880	
State, federal district, or territory	Name	Pop.	Name	Pop.	Name	Pop.	Name	Pop.	Name	Pop.
Alabama	Mobile	12,672	Mobile	20,515	Mobile	29,258	Mobile	32,034	Mobile	29,132
Arizona	—		—		Tucson	915 (Note: Part of the Territory of New Mexico)	Tucson	3,224	Tucson	7,007
Arkansas	—		Little Rock	2,167	Little Rock	3,727	Little Rock	12,380	Little Rock	13,138
California	—		Sacramento	6,820	San Francisco	56,802	San Francisco	149,473	San Francisco	233,959
Colorado	—		—		Denver	4,749	Denver	4,759	Denver	35,629
Connecticut	New Haven	12,960	New Haven	20,345	New Haven	39,267	New Haven	50,840	New Haven	62,882
Delaware	Wilmington	8,367	Wilmington	13,979	Wilmington	21,258	Wilmington	30,841	Wilmington	42,478
District of Columbia	Washington City	23,364	Washington City	40,001	Washington City	61,122	Washington City	109,199	Washington (Note: In 1871, Georgetown, Washington City, and Washington County, D.C. were unified.)	147,293
Florida	St. Augustine	2,352	Key West	2,367	Pensacola	2,876	Jacksonville	6,912	Key West	8,890
Georgia	Savannah	11,214	Savannah	15,312	Savannah	22,292	Savannah	28,235	Atlanta	37,409
Hawaii (Note: The only incorporated place in Hawaii is the City & County of Honolulu. The U.S. Census Bureau defines Honolulu CDP (census-designated place) as coincident with the Honolulu District, the portion of the city and county sometimes regarded as the "city" for statistical purposes.)	—		—		—		—		Honolulu	14,114 (Note: From the 1878 Census by the Kingdom of Hawaiʻi.)
Idaho	—		—		—		Boise	995	Boise	1,899
Illinois	Chicago	4,470	Chicago	29,963	Chicago	112,172	Chicago	298,977	Chicago	503,185
Indiana	New Albany	4,226	New Albany	8,181	Indianapolis	18,611	Indianapolis	48,244	Indianapolis	75,056
Iowa	—		Dubuque	3,108	Dubuque	13,000	Davenport	20,038	Des Moines	22,408
Kansas	—		—		Leavenworth	7,429	Leavenworth	17,873	Leavenworth	16,546
Kentucky	Louisville	21,210	Louisville	43,194	Louisville	68,033	Louisville	100,753	Louisville	123,758
Louisiana	New Orleans	102,193	New Orleans	116,375	New Orleans	168,675	New Orleans	191,418	New Orleans	216,090
Maine	Portland	15,218	Portland	20,815	Portland	26,341	Portland	31,413	Portland	33,810
Maryland	Baltimore	102,313	Baltimore	169,054	Baltimore	212,418	Baltimore	267,354	Baltimore	332,313
Massachusetts	Boston	93,383	Boston	136,881	Boston	177,840	Boston	250,526	Boston	362,839
Michigan	Detroit	9,102	Detroit	21,019	Detroit	45,619	Detroit	79,577	Detroit	116,340
Minnesota	—		St. Paul	1,112	Minneapolis	2,564	Minneapolis	13,066	Minneapolis	46,887
Mississippi	Natchez	3,612	Natchez	4,434	Natchez	6,612	Vicksburg	12,443	Vicksburg	11,814
Missouri	St. Louis	16,469	St. Louis	77,860	St. Louis	160,773	St. Louis	310,864	St. Louis	350,518
Montana	—		—		—		Helena	3,106	Helena	3,624
Nebraska	—		—		Omaha	1,883	Omaha	16,083	Omaha	30,518
Nevada	—		—		—		Virginia City	2,345	Virginia City	7,048
New Hampshire	Portsmouth	7,887	Manchester	13,932	Manchester	20,107	Manchester	23,536	Manchester	32,630
New Jersey	Newark	17,290	Newark	38,894	Newark	71,941	Newark	105,059	Newark	136,508
New Mexico	—		Santa Fe	4,846	Santa Fe	4,635	Santa Fe	4,765	Santa Fe	6,635
New York	New York City	312,710	New York City	515,547	New York City	813,669	New York City	942,292	New York City (Note: In 1875, West Bronx was annexed to New York City.)	1,206,299
North Carolina	Wilmington	5,335	Wilmington	7,264	Wilmington	9,552	Wilmington	13,446	Wilmington	17,350
North Dakota (Note: From 1861–1889, part of the Dakota Territory)	—		—		—		—		Fargo	2,693
Ohio	Cincinnati	46,338	Cincinnati	115,435	Cincinnati	161,044	Cincinnati	216,239	Cincinnati	255,139
Oregon	—		Portland	821	Portland	2,874	Portland	8,293	Portland	17,577
Pennsylvania	Philadelphia	93,665	Philadelphia	121,376	Philadelphia (Note: The 1854 Act of Consolidation greatly increased Philadelphia's population by consolidating the city with Philadelphia County.)	565,529	Philadelphia	674,022	Philadelphia	847,170
Rhode Island	Providence	23,171	Providence	41,513	Providence	50,666	Providence	68,904	Providence	104,857
South Carolina	Charleston	29,261	Charleston	42,985	Charleston	40,522	Charleston	48,956	Charleston	49,984
South Dakota	—		—		Yankton Agency	458	Yankton	737	Deadwood	3,777
Tennessee	Nashville	6,929	Nashville	10,165	Memphis	22,623	Memphis	40,226	Nashville	43,350
Texas	—		Galveston	4,177	San Antonio	8,235	Galveston	13,818	Galveston	22,248
Utah	—		—		Salt Lake City	8,236	Salt Lake City	12,854	Salt Lake City	20,768
Vermont	Burlington	4,271	Burlington	7,585	Burlington	7,713	Burlington	14,387	Burlington	11,365
Virginia	Richmond	20,153	Richmond	27,570	Richmond	37,910	Richmond	51,038	Richmond	63,600
(Washington (state)) Washington	—		—		—		Seattle	1,107	Seattle	3,533
West Virginia (Note: Prior to 1863, West Virginia was part of Virginia.)	Wheeling	7,885	Wheeling	11,435	Wheeling	14,083	Wheeling	19,280	Wheeling	30,737
Wisconsin	Milwaukee	1,712	Milwaukee	20,061	Milwaukee	45,246	Milwaukee	71,440	Milwaukee	115,587
Wyoming	—		—		—		Cheyenne	1,450	Cheyenne	3,456

== 1890–1930 ==
State, federal district, or territory	1890		1900		1910		1920		1930	
State, federal district, or territory	Name	Pop.	Name	Pop.	Name	Pop.	Name	Pop.	Name	Pop.
Alabama	Mobile	31,076	Mobile	38,469	Birmingham	132,685	Birmingham	178,806	Birmingham	259,678
Alaska	—		—		Fairbanks	3,541	Juneau	3,058	Juneau	4,043
American Samoa	—		—		—		Pago Pago	568	Pago Pago	706
Arizona	Tucson	5,150	Tucson	7,531	Tucson	13,193	Phoenix	29,053	Phoenix	48,118
Arkansas	Little Rock	25,874	Little Rock	38,307	Little Rock	45,941	Little Rock	65,142	Little Rock	81,679
California	San Francisco	298,997	San Francisco	342,782	San Francisco	416,912	Los Angeles	576,673	Los Angeles	1,238,048
Colorado	Denver	106,713	Denver	133,859	Denver	213,381	Denver	256,491	Denver	287,861
Connecticut	New Haven	81,298	New Haven	108,027	New Haven	133,605	Hartford	162,537	Hartford	164,072
Delaware	Wilmington	61,431	Wilmington	76,508	Wilmington	87,411	Wilmington	110,168	Wilmington	106,597
District of Columbia	Washington	230,392	Washington	278,718	Washington	331,069	Washington	437,571	Washington	486,869
Florida	Key West	18,080	Jacksonville	28,429	Jacksonville	57,699	Jacksonville	91,558	Jacksonville	129,549
Georgia	Atlanta	65,533	Atlanta	89,872	Atlanta	154,839	Atlanta	200,616	Atlanta	270,366
Hawaii	Honolulu	22,907 (Note: From the 1890 Census by the Kingdom of Hawaiʻi.)	Honolulu	39,306	Honolulu	52,183	Honolulu	83,327	Honolulu	137,582
Idaho	Boise	2,311	Boise	5,957	Boise	17,358	Boise	21,393	Boise	21,544
Illinois	Chicago	1,099,850	Chicago	1,698,575	Chicago	2,185,283	Chicago	2,701,705	Chicago	3,376,438
Indiana	Indianapolis	105,436	Indianapolis	169,164	Indianapolis	233,650	Indianapolis	314,194	Indianapolis	364,161
Iowa	Des Moines	50,093	Des Moines	62,139	Des Moines	86,368	Des Moines	126,468	Des Moines	142,559
Kansas	Kansas City	38,316	Kansas City	51,418	Kansas City	82,331	Kansas City	101,177	Kansas City	121,857
Kentucky	Louisville	161,129	Louisville	204,731	Louisville	223,928	Louisville	234,891	Louisville	307,745
Louisiana	New Orleans	242,039	New Orleans	287,104	New Orleans	339,075	New Orleans	387,219	New Orleans	458,762
Maine	Portland	36,425	Portland	50,145	Portland	58,571	Portland	69,272	Portland	70,810
Maryland	Baltimore	434,439	Baltimore	508,957	Baltimore	558,485	Baltimore	733,826	Baltimore	804,874
Massachusetts	Boston	448,477	Boston	560,892	Boston	670,585	Boston	748,060	Boston	781,188
Michigan	Detroit	205,876	Detroit	285,704	Detroit	465,766	Detroit	993,678	Detroit	1,568,662
Minnesota	Minneapolis	164,738	Minneapolis	202,718	Minneapolis	301,408	Minneapolis	380,582	Minneapolis	464,356
Mississippi	Vicksburg	13,373	Vicksburg	14,834	Meridian	23,285	Meridian	23,399	Jackson	48,282
Missouri	St. Louis	451,770	St. Louis	575,238	St. Louis	687,029	St. Louis	772,897	St. Louis	821,960
Montana	Butte	10,723	Butte	30,470	Butte	39,165	Butte	41,611	Butte	39,532
Nebraska	Omaha	140,452	Omaha	102,555	Omaha	124,096	Omaha	191,601	Omaha	214,006
Nevada	Virginia City	10,917	Reno	4,500	Reno	10,867	Reno	12,016	Reno	18,529
New Hampshire	Manchester	44,126	Manchester	56,987	Manchester	70,063	Manchester	78,384	Manchester	76,834
New Jersey	Newark	181,830	Newark	246,070	Newark	347,469	Newark	414,524	Newark	442,337
New Mexico	Santa Fe	6,185	Albuquerque	6,238	Albuquerque	11,020	Albuquerque	15,157	Albuquerque	26,570
New York	New York City	1,515,301	New York City (Note: In 1899, the modern New York City was formed when the five boroughs were consolidated into a single city.)	3,437,202	New York City	4,766,883	New York City	5,620,048	New York City	6,930,446
North Carolina	Wilmington	20,056	Wilmington	20,976	Charlotte	34,014	Winston-Salem	48,395	Charlotte	82,675
North Dakota	Fargo	5,664	Fargo	9,589	Fargo	14,331	Fargo	21,961	Fargo	28,619
Ohio	Cleveland	261,353	Cleveland	381,768	Cleveland	560,663	Cleveland	796,841	Cleveland	900,429
Oklahoma (Note: The 1890 and 1900 columns reflect the largest settlement in the Oklahoma Territory and Indian Territory, which were combined when Oklahoma became a state in 1907.)	Guthrie	5,333 (Note: Combined total for Guthrie, East Guthrie, and West Guthrie, as reported in the 1940 U.S. Census.)	Oklahoma City	10,037	Oklahoma City	64,205	Oklahoma City	91,295	Oklahoma City	185,389
Oregon	Portland	46,385	Portland	90,426	Portland	207,214	Portland	258,288	Portland	301,815
Panama Canal Zone (Note: This territory no longer exists.)	—		—		—		—		Silver City	4,460
Pennsylvania	Philadelphia	1,046,964	Philadelphia	1,293,697	Philadelphia	1,549,008	Philadelphia	1,823,779	Philadelphia	1,950,961
Puerto Rico	—		San Juan	32,048 (Note: From the 1899 Puerto Rico census.)	San Juan	48,716	San Juan	71,443	San Juan	114,715
Rhode Island	Providence	132,146	Providence	175,597	Providence	224,326	Providence	237,595	Providence	252,981
South Carolina	Charleston	54,955	Charleston	55,807	Charleston	58,833	Charleston	67,957	Charleston	62,265
South Dakota	Sioux Falls	10,177	Sioux Falls	10,266	Sioux Falls	14,094	Sioux Falls	25,202	Sioux Falls	33,362
Tennessee	Nashville	76,168	Memphis	102,320	Memphis	131,105	Memphis	162,351	Memphis	253,143
Texas	Dallas	38,069	San Antonio	53,321	San Antonio	96,614	San Antonio	161,379	Houston	292,352
U.S. Virgin Islands	—		—		—		Charlotte Amalie (Note: From the 1917 Census of the Virgin Islands of the United States)	7,747	St. Thomas City (Note: From 1921 to 1936, Charlotte Amalie was known as St. Thomas City)	7,036
Utah	Salt Lake City	44,843	Salt Lake City	53,531	Salt Lake City	92,777	Salt Lake City	118,110	Salt Lake City	140,267
Vermont	Burlington	14,590	Burlington	18,640	Burlington	20,468	Burlington	22,779	Burlington	24,789
Virginia	Richmond	81,388	Richmond	85,050	Richmond	127,628	Richmond	171,667	Richmond	182,929
(Washington (state)) Washington	Seattle	42,837	Seattle	80,671	Seattle	237,194	Seattle	315,312	Seattle	365,583
West Virginia	Wheeling	34,522	Wheeling	38,878	Wheeling	41,641	Wheeling	56,208	Huntington	75,572
Wisconsin	Milwaukee	204,468	Milwaukee	285,315	Milwaukee	373,857	Milwaukee	457,147	Milwaukee	578,249
Wyoming	Cheyenne	11,690	Cheyenne	14,087	Cheyenne	11,320	Cheyenne	13,829	Cheyenne	17,361

== 1940–1980 ==
State, federal district, or territory	1940		1950		1960		1970		1980	
State, federal district, or territory	Name	Pop.	Name	Pop.	Name	Pop.	Name	Pop.	Name	Pop.
Alabama	Birmingham	267,583	Birmingham	326,037	Birmingham	340,887	Birmingham	300,910	Birmingham	284,388
Alaska	Juneau	5,729	Anchorage	11,254	Anchorage	44,237	Anchorage	48,081	Anchorage	174,431
American Samoa	Pago Pago	934	Pago Pago	1,586	Fagatogo	1,344	Pago Pago	2,451	Pago Pago	3,075
Arizona	Phoenix	65,414	Phoenix	106,818	Phoenix	439,170	Phoenix	581,572	Phoenix	789,704
Arkansas	Little Rock	88,039	Little Rock	102,213	Little Rock	107,813	Little Rock	132,483	Little Rock	158,461
California	Los Angeles	1,504,277	Los Angeles	1,970,358	Los Angeles	2,479,015	Los Angeles	2,816,061	Los Angeles	2,966,850
Colorado	Denver	322,412	Denver	415,786	Denver	493,887	Denver	514,678	Denver	492,365
Connecticut	Hartford	166,267	Hartford	177,397	Hartford	162,178	Hartford	158,017	Bridgeport	142,546
Delaware	Wilmington	112,504	Wilmington	110,356	Wilmington	95,827	Wilmington	80,386	Wilmington	70,195
District of Columbia	Washington	663,091	Washington	802,178	Washington	763,956	Washington	756,510	Washington	638,333
Florida	Jacksonville	173,065	Miami	249,276	Miami (Note: In 1957, Miami and Dade County consolidated.)	291,688	Jacksonville (Note: In 1968, Jacksonville consolidated with Duval County.)	504,265	Jacksonville	540,920
Georgia	Atlanta	302,288	Atlanta	331,314	Atlanta	487,455	Atlanta	496,973	Atlanta	425,022
Guam	—		Tamuning	5,380	Tamuning	5,944	Yigo	11,542	Dededo	23,664
Hawaii	Honolulu	179,326	Honolulu	248,034	Honolulu	294,194	Honolulu	324,871	Honolulu	365,048
Idaho	Boise	26,130	Boise	34,393	Boise	34,481	Boise	74,990	Boise	102,249
Illinois	Chicago	3,396,808	Chicago	3,620,962	Chicago	3,550,404	Chicago	3,366,957	Chicago	3,005,072
Indiana	Indianapolis	386,972	Indianapolis	427,173	Indianapolis	476,258	Indianapolis (Note: On January 1, 1970, Indianapolis and Marion County consolidated under a single governance structure.)	744,624	Indianapolis	700,807
Iowa	Des Moines	159,819	Des Moines	177,965	Des Moines	208,982	Des Moines	200,587	Des Moines	191,003
Kansas	Kansas City	121,458	Wichita	168,279	Wichita	254,698	Wichita	276,554	Wichita	279,272
Kentucky	Louisville	319,077	Louisville	369,129	Louisville	390,639	Louisville	361,472	Louisville	298,451
Louisiana	New Orleans	494,537	New Orleans	570,445	New Orleans	627,525	New Orleans	593,471	New Orleans	557,515
Maine	Portland	73,643	Portland	77,634	Portland	72,566	Portland	65,116	Portland	61,572
Maryland	Baltimore	859,100	Baltimore	949,708	Baltimore	939,024	Baltimore	905,759	Baltimore	786,775
Massachusetts	Boston	770,816	Boston	801,444	Boston	697,197	Boston	641,071	Boston	562,994
Michigan	Detroit	1,623,452	Detroit	1,849,568	Detroit	1,670,144	Detroit	1,511,482	Detroit	1,203,339
Minnesota	Minneapolis	492,370	Minneapolis	521,718	Minneapolis	482,872	Minneapolis	434,400	Minneapolis	370,951
Mississippi	Jackson	62,107	Jackson	98,271	Jackson	144,422	Jackson	153,968	Jackson	202,895
Missouri	St. Louis	816,048	St. Louis	856,796	St. Louis	750,026	St. Louis	622,23	St. Louis	453,085
Montana	Butte	37,081	Great Falls	39,214	Great Falls	55,357	Billings	66,798	Billings	66,798
Nebraska	Omaha	223,844	Omaha	251,117	Omaha	301,598	Omaha	347,328	Omaha	314,255
Nevada	Reno	21,317	Reno	32,497	Las Vegas	64,405	Las Vegas	125,787	Las Vegas	164,674
New Hampshire	Manchester	77,685	Manchester	82,732	Manchester	88,282	Manchester	87,754	Manchester	90,936
New Jersey	Newark	429,760	Newark	438,776	Newark	405,220	Newark	382,417	Newark	329,248
New Mexico	Albuquerque	26,570	Albuquerque	35,449	Albuquerque	96,815	Albuquerque	243,751	Albuquerque	331,767
New York	New York City	7,454,995	New York City	7,891,957	New York City	7,781,984	New York City	7,894,862	New York City	7,071,639
North Carolina	Charlotte	100,899	Charlotte	134,042	Charlotte	201,564	Charlotte	241,178	Charlotte	314,447
North Dakota	Fargo	32,580	Fargo	38,256	Fargo	46,662	Fargo	53,365	Fargo	61,383
Northern Mariana Islands	—		—		—		Chalan Kanoa	3,481	Chalan Kanoa	2,678
Ohio	Cleveland	878,336	Cleveland	914,808	Cleveland	876,050	Cleveland	750,903	Cleveland	573,822
Oklahoma	Oklahoma City	204,424	Oklahoma City	243,504	Oklahoma City	324,253	Oklahoma City	366,481	Oklahoma City	403,213
Oregon	Portland	305,394	Portland	373,628	Portland	372,676	Portland	382,619	Portland	366,383
Panama Canal Zone	Silver City	4,583	Silver City	5,729	Rainbow City (Note: In 1952, residents voted to change the town's name from Silver City to Rainbow City)	3,688	Balboa	2,569	Territory Abolished	
Pennsylvania	Philadelphia	1,931,334	Philadelphia	2,071,605	Philadelphia	2,002,512	Philadelphia	1,948,609	Philadelphia	1,688,210
Puerto Rico	San Juan	223,949	San Juan	224,767	San Juan	451,658	San Juan	463,242	San Juan	434,849
Rhode Island	Providence	253,504	Providence	248,674	Providence	207,498	Providence	179,213	Providence	156,804
South Carolina	Charleston	71,275	Columbia	86,914	Columbia	97,433	Columbia	113,542	Columbia	101,208
South Dakota	Sioux Falls	40,832	Sioux Falls	52,696	Sioux Falls	65,466	Sioux Falls	72,488	Sioux Falls	81,182
Tennessee	Memphis	292,942	Memphis	396,000	Memphis	497,524	Memphis	623,530	Memphis	646,356
Texas	Houston	384,514	Houston	596,163	Houston	938,219	Houston	1,232,802	Houston	1,595,138
U.S. Virgin Islands	Charlotte Amalie	9,801	Charlotte Amalie	11,469	Charlotte Amalie	12,880	Charlotte Amalie	12,220	Charlotte Amalie	11,842
Utah	Salt Lake City	149,934	Salt Lake City	182,121	Salt Lake City	189,454	Salt Lake City	175,885	Salt Lake City	163,033
Vermont	Burlington	27,686	Burlington	33,155	Burlington	35,531	Burlington	37,712	Burlington	39,127
Virginia	Richmond	193,042	Richmond	230,310	Norfolk	305,872	Norfolk	307,951	Norfolk	266,979
Washington	Seattle	368,302	Seattle	467,591	Seattle	557,087	Seattle	530,831	Seattle	493,846
West Virginia	Huntington	78,836	Huntington	86,353	Charleston	85,796	Huntington	74,315	Huntington	63,968
Wisconsin	Milwaukee	587,472	Milwaukee	637,392	Milwaukee	741,324	Milwaukee	717,099	Milwaukee	636,212
Wyoming	Cheyenne	22,474	Cheyenne	31,935	Cheyenne	43,505	Cheyenne	41,254	Casper	51,016

== 1990–2020 ==
State, federal district, or territory	1990		2000		2010		2020	
State, federal district, or territory	Name	Pop.	Name	Pop.	Name	Pop.	Name	Pop.
Alabama	Birmingham	263,555	Birmingham	242,840	Birmingham	212,237	Huntsville	215,006
Alaska	Anchorage	226,338	Anchorage	260,283	Anchorage	291,826	Anchorage	291,247
American Samoa	Tāfuna	5,174	Tāfuna	8,409	Tāfuna	7,945	Tāfuna	7,988
Arizona	Phoenix	992,551	Phoenix	1,321,045	Phoenix	1,445,632	Phoenix	1,660,272
Arkansas	Little Rock	175,795	Little Rock	183,133	Little Rock	193,524	Little Rock	197,881
California	Los Angeles	3,485,398	Los Angeles	3,694,820	Los Angeles	3,792,621	Los Angeles	3,898,747
Colorado	Denver	467,610	Denver	554,636	Denver	600,158	Denver	715,522
Connecticut	Bridgeport	141,686	Bridgeport	139,529	Bridgeport	144,229	Bridgeport	148,654
Delaware	Wilmington	71,529	Wilmington	72,664	Wilmington	70,851	Wilmington	70,635
District of Columbia	Washington	606,900	Washington	572,059	Washington	601,723	Washington	689,545
Florida	Jacksonville	635,230	Jacksonville	735,503	Jacksonville	821,784	Jacksonville	949,611
Georgia	Atlanta	394,017	Atlanta	416,474	Atlanta	420,003	Atlanta	504,527
Guam	Dededo	31,728	Dededo	42,980	Dededo	44,943	Dededo	44,908
Hawaii	Honolulu	365,272	Honolulu	371,657	Honolulu	337,256	Honolulu	347,397
Idaho	Boise	125,738	Boise	185,787	Boise	205,671	Boise	228,790
Illinois	Chicago	2,783,726	Chicago	2,896,016	Chicago	2,695,598	Chicago	2,705,994
Indiana	Indianapolis	731,327	Indianapolis	781,926	Indianapolis	820,445	Indianapolis	867,125
Iowa	Des Moines	193,187	Des Moines	198,682	Des Moines	203,433	Des Moines	216,853
Kansas	Wichita	304,011	Wichita	344,284	Wichita	382,368	Wichita	389,225
Kentucky	Louisville	269,063	Lexington	260,512 (Note: In 1974, the city of Lexington merged with Fayette County, becoming a consolidated city-county.)	Louisville	597,337 (Note: In 2003, the city of Louisville merged with Jefferson County, becoming a consolidated city-county and substantially increasing the city's population.)	Louisville	620,578
Louisiana	New Orleans	496,938	New Orleans	484,674	New Orleans	343,829	New Orleans	399,187
Maine	Portland	64,358	Portland	64,249	Portland	66,194	Portland	68,408
Maryland	Baltimore	736,016	Baltimore	651,154	Baltimore	620,961	Baltimore	585,708
Massachusetts	Boston	574,283	Boston	589,141	Boston	617,594	Boston	675,647
Michigan	Detroit	1,027,974	Detroit	951,270	Detroit	713,777	Detroit	639,111
Minnesota	Minneapolis	368,383	Minneapolis	382,618	Minneapolis	382,578	Minneapolis	429,954
Mississippi	Jackson	196,637	Jackson	184,286	Jackson	173,514	Jackson	164,422
Missouri	Kansas City	435,146	Kansas City	441,545	Kansas City	459,787	Kansas City	507,928
Montana	Billings	81,151	Billings	89,847	Billings	104,170	Billings	116,827
Nebraska	Omaha	335,795	Omaha	390,007	Omaha	408,958	Omaha	468,262
Nevada	Las Vegas	258,295	Las Vegas	478,434	Las Vegas	583,756	Las Vegas	649,876
New Hampshire	Manchester	99,332	Manchester	107,006	Manchester	109,565	Manchester	115,644
New Jersey	Newark	275,221	Newark	273,546	Newark	277,140	Newark	282,090
New Mexico	Albuquerque	384,736	Albuquerque	448,607	Albuquerque	545,852	Albuquerque	560,218
New York	New York City	7,322,564	New York City	8,008,278	New York City	8,175,133	New York City	8,879,928
North Carolina	Charlotte	395,934	Charlotte	540,828	Charlotte	731,424	Charlotte	882,367
North Dakota	Fargo	74,111	Fargo	90,599	Fargo	105,549	Fargo	124,844
Northern Mariana Islands	Garapan	3,904	Garapan	3,588	Garapan	3,983	Garapan	3,096
Ohio	Columbus	632,910	Columbus	715,971	Columbus	787,033	Columbus	895,477
Oklahoma	Oklahoma City	444,719	Oklahoma City	506,132	Oklahoma City	579,999	Oklahoma City	649,021
Oregon	Portland	437,319	Portland	529,121	Portland	583,776	Portland	661,189
Pennsylvania	Philadelphia	1,585,577	Philadelphia	1,517,550	Philadelphia	1,526,006	Philadelphia	1,587,828
Puerto Rico	San Juan	437,745	San Juan	434,374	San Juan	395,326	San Juan	320,967
Rhode Island	Providence	160,728	Providence	173,618	Providence	178,042	Providence	190,934
South Carolina	Columbia	98,052	Columbia	116,278	Columbia	129,272	Charleston	136,208
South Dakota	Sioux Falls	100,814	Sioux Falls	123,975	Sioux Falls	153,888	Sioux Falls	181,883
Tennessee	Memphis	610,337	Memphis	650,100	Memphis	646,889	Nashville	681,928
Texas	Houston	1,630,553	Houston	1,953,631	Houston	2,099,451	Houston	2,325,502
U.S. Virgin Islands	Charlotte Amalie	12,331	Charlotte Amalie	11,044	Charlotte Amalie	8,194	Charlotte Amalie	10,354
Utah	Salt Lake City	159,936	Salt Lake City	181,743	Salt Lake City	186,440	Salt Lake City	200,591
Vermont	Burlington	38,889	Burlington	42,417	Burlington	42,417	Burlington	42,899
Virginia	Virginia Beach	393,069	Virginia Beach	425,257	Virginia Beach	437,994	Virginia Beach	450,189
Washington	Seattle	516,259	Seattle	563,374	Seattle	608,660	Seattle	754,567
West Virginia	Charleston	57,287	Charleston	53,421	Charleston	51,400	Charleston	47,215
Wisconsin	Milwaukee	628,088	Milwaukee	596,974	Milwaukee	594,833	Milwaukee	592,025
Wyoming	Cheyenne	50,008	Cheyenne	53,011	Cheyenne	59,466	Cheyenne	63,957

== See also ==
- List of most populous cities in the United States by decade
- List of U.S. states and territories by historical population
- List of United States cities by population
- List of largest cities of U.S. states and territories by population
