= Fernando Ramsey =

Panamanian baseball player (born 1965)

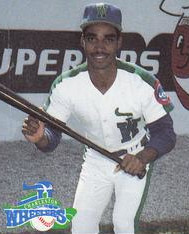
- Ramsey in 1988
- Center fielder
- Born: December 20, 1965 (age 60); Rainbow City, Panama
- Batted: Right Threw: Right

MLB debut
- September 7, 1992, for the Chicago Cubs

Last MLB appearance
- October 3, 1992, for the Chicago Cubs

MLB statistics
- Games played: 18
- Batting average: .120
- Hits: 3
- Stats at Baseball Reference

Teams
- Chicago Cubs (1992)
Medals
Athletics
Representing Panama
CAC Junior Championships (U20)
Bronze medal – third place	1984 San Juan	100 m

Fernando David Ramsey Ramsey (born December 20, 1965) is a Panamanian former center fielder who played in Major League Baseball. Listed at 6' 1" (1.86 m), 175 lb. (79 k), Ramsey batted and threw right handed. He was born in Rainbow City, a section of the city of Colón in Panama.

== Early life ==
While growing up, Ramsey was also active and successful in track and field, winning medals for Panama at the Central American and Caribbean Junior Championships. Ramsey began running at eleven years old and earned a scholarship to run track at New Mexico State University. He had never played baseball competitively until the Aggies baseball coach convinced him to join the team.

Year	Competition	Venue	Position	Event	Notes
Representing Panama
1984	Central American and Caribbean Junior Championships (U-20)	San Juan, Puerto Rico	3rd	100 m	10.65 w (3.0 m/s)

== Career ==
The Chicago Cubs selected Ramsey in the 33rd round of the 1987 MLB draft out of New Mexico State, and assigned him immediately to Class A Geneva Cubs. Following five promotions, he joined briefly the Cubs during its 1992 season. He hit a batting average of .120 (3-for-20) in 18 games, but did not score or drive in a run.

Ramsey later played in the New York Mets and Chicago White Sox minor league systems, and also saw action in the Mexican Summer League and the Venezuelan Winter League.

== Personal life ==
Ramsey and his wife, Sylvia, had their first child, a son named Nicholas, in November 1994. As of 1995, they were living in Brookfield, Connecticut. Ramsey earned a degree in business administration from New Mexico State.
