= List of U.S. states and territories by historical population =

The population growth of each U.S. state from 1970 to 2020. Population decline Population growth of less than 24.99% Population growth of less than 49.99% Population growth of less than 99.99% Population growth of less than 149.99% Population growth of less than 199.99% Population growth of more than 200.00%

This is a list of U.S. states and territories by historical population, as enumerated every decade by the United States Census. As required by the United States Constitution, a census has been conducted every 10 years since 1790. Although the decennial census collects a variety of information that has been used in demographic studies, marketing, and other enterprises, the purpose of the census as stated in the Constitution is to produce an "actual enumeration" of the number of persons in the states in order to calculate their Congressional apportionment.

As the United States has grown in area and population, new states have been formed out of U.S. territories or the division of existing states. The population figures provided here reflect modern state boundaries. Shaded areas of the tables indicate census years when a territory or the part of another state had not yet been admitted as a new state. (Note: The District of Columbia is not shaded.) Since 1920, the "total population" of the United States has been considered the population of all the States and the District of Columbia; territories and other possessions were counted as additional population. (Note: Prior to 1920, territories in the continental United States were generally included in the total population figure, but more far-flung territories were not.) As of 2021, five U.S. territories (American Samoa, Guam, the Northern Mariana Islands, Puerto Rico and the U.S. Virgin Islands), along with the U.S. Minor Outlying Islands, are not included in the count of total U.S. population.

== 1790 to 1860, Census Data ==
=== Total population, 1790 to 1860 ===
Total population counts for the Censuses of 1790-1860 include both free and enslaved persons. Native Americans were not identified in the Census of 1790 through 1840 and only sporadically from 1850 until 1890, if they lived outside of Indian Territory or off reservations. Beginning with the 1900 census, Native Americans were fully enumerated along with the general population.

Name	Admitted (Note: Dates for the states are the dates they were admitted to the Union. Dates for the territories are the dates they were acquired by the United States (shown in italics). Date for the District of Columbia is the date the district was formed.)	1790	1800	1810	1820	1830	1840	1850	1860
Alabama	1819		1,250	9,046	127,901	309,527	590,756	771,623	964,201
Alaska	1959								
American Samoa	1900								
Arizona	1912								
Arkansas	1836			1,062	14,273	30,388	97,574	209,897	435,450
California	1850							92,597	379,994
Colorado	1876								34,277
Connecticut	1788	237,946	251,002	262,042	275,202	297,675	309,978	370,792	460,147
Delaware	1787	59,096	64,273	72,674	72,749	76,748	78,085	91,532	112,216
District of Columbia (Note: The District of Columbia is not a state, but was created through the Residence Act of 1790 from territory donated by Maryland and Virginia; however, the Virginia portion was retroceded to the state in 1846.)	1790		8,144	15,471	23,336	30,261	33,745	51,687	75,080
Florida	1845					34,730	54,477	87,445	140,424
Georgia	1788	82,548	162,686	251,407	340,989	516,823	691,392	906,185	1,057,286
Guam	1899								
Hawaii	1959								
Idaho	1890								
Illinois	1818		2,458	12,282	55,211	157,445	476,183	851,470	1,711,951
Indiana	1816		2,632	24,520	147,178	343,031	685,866	988,416	1,350,428
Iowa	1846						43,112	192,214	674,913
Kansas	1861								107,206
Kentucky	1792	73,677	220,959	406,511	564,317	687,917	779,828	982,405	1,155,684
Louisiana (Note: Previously a part of the Orleans Territory.)	1812			76,556	153,407	215,739	352,411	517,762	708,002
Maine (Note: Between 1790 and 1820, the District of Maine was part of the state of Massachusetts.)	1820	96,540	151,719	228,705	298,335	399,455	501,793	583,169	628,279
Maryland (Note: Starting with the 1800 Census, Maryland donated territory to create the District of Columbia.)	1788	319,728	341,548	380,546	407,350	447,040	470,019	583,034	687,049
Massachusetts	1788	378,787	422,845	472,040	523,287	610,408	737,699	994,514	1,231,066
Michigan	1837		3,757	4,762	7,452	28,004	212,267	397,654	749,113
Minnesota	1858							6,077	172,023
Mississippi	1817		7,600	31,306	75,448	136,621	375,651	606,526	791,305
Missouri	1821			19,783	66,586	140,455	383,702	682,044	1,182,012
Montana	1889								
Nebraska	1867								28,841
Nevada	1864								6,857
New Hampshire	1788	141,885	183,858	214,360	244,161	269,328	284,574	317,976	326,073
New Jersey	1787	184,139	211,149	245,555	277,575	320,823	373,306	489,555	672,035
New Mexico	1912							61,547	93,516
New York	1788	340,120	586,050	959,049	1,372,812	1,918,608	2,428,921	3,097,394	3,880,735
North Carolina	1789	393,751	478,103	556,526	638,829	737,987	753,419	869,039	992,622
North Dakota	1889								
Northern Mariana Islands	1986								
Ohio	1803		42,159	230,760	581,434	937,903	1,519,467	1,980,329	2,339,511
Oklahoma	1907								
Oregon	1859							12,093	52,465
Pennsylvania	1787	434,373	602,545	810,091	1,049,458	1,348,233	1,724,033	2,311,786	2,906,215
Puerto Rico	1899								
Rhode Island	1790	68,825	69,122	76,931	83,059	97,199	108,830	147,545	174,620
South Carolina	1788	249,073	345,591	415,115	502,741	581,185	594,398	668,507	703,708
South Dakota (Note: Figures recorded for Dakota Territory by the censuses of 1860, 1870, and 1880 are listed here as belonging to South Dakota.)	1889								4,837
Tennessee	1796	35,691	105,602	261,727	422,813	681,904	829,210	1,002,717	1,109,801
Texas	1845							212,592	604,215
U.S. Virgin Islands	1917								
Utah	1896							11,380	40,273
Vermont (Note: Vermont was enumerated in the 1790 Census but was only admitted as a state in 1791.)	1791	85,425	154,465	217,713	235,764	280,652	291,948	314,120	315,098
Virginia (Note: Between 1790 and 1860, the state of West Virginia was part of Virginia. In addition, between the Censuses of 1800 and 1840, territory donated by the state of Virginia formed a portion of District of Columbia, but the land was returned in 1846.)	1788	691,937	807,557	877,683	938,261	1,044,054	1,025,227	1,119,348	1,219,630
(Washington (state)) Washington	1889							1,201	11,594
West Virginia (Note: Between 1790 and 1860, the state of West Virginia was part of Virginia; the data for each state reflect the present-day boundaries.)	1863	55,873	78,592	105,469	136,808	176,924	224,537	302,313	376,688
Wisconsin	1848				1,444	3,635	30,945	305,391	775,881
Wyoming	1890								
United States		3,929,214	5,308,483	7,239,881	9,638,453	12,860,702	17,063,353	23,191,876	31,443,321

=== Enslaved population, 1790 to 1860 ===
The below figures cover only people held in bondage. They are also counted in the total population figures above.

Name	1790	1800	1810	1820	1830	1840	1850	1860
Alabama		494	2,565	41,879	117,549	253,532	342,844	435,081
Arkansas			136	1,617	4,576	19,935	47,100	111,115
California							0	0
Colorado								0
Connecticut	2,764	951	310	97	25	17	0	0
Delaware	8,887	6,153	4,177	4,509	3,292	2,605	2,290	1,798
District of Columbia		2,072	3,554	4,520	4,505	3,320	3,687	3,185
Florida					15,501	25,717	39,310	61,745
Georgia	29,264	59,699	105,218	149,656	217,531	280,944	381,682	462,198
Illinois		107	168	917	747	331	0	0
Indiana		28	237	190	3	3	0	0
Iowa						16	0	0
Kansas								2
Kentucky	12,430	40,343	80,561	126,732	165,213	182,258	210,981	225,483
Louisiana			34,660	69,064	109,588	168,452	244,809	331,726
Maine	0	0	0	0	2	0	0	0
Maryland	103,036	105,635	111,502	107,398	102,994	89,737	90,368	87,189
Massachusetts	0	0	0	0	1	0	0	0
Michigan		0	24	0	1	0	0	0
Minnesota							0	0
Mississippi		2,995	14,523	32,814	65,659	195,211	309,878	436,631
Missouri			2,875	10,222	25,091	58,240	87,422	114,931
Nebraska								15
Nevada								0
New Hampshire	158	8	0	0	3	1	0	0
New Jersey	11,423	12,422	10,851	7,557	2,254	674	236	18
New Mexico							0	0
New York	21,324	20,613	15,017	10,088	75	4	0	0
North Carolina	100,572	133,296	168,824	204,917	245,601	245,817	288,548	331,059
Ohio		0	0	0	6	3	0	0
Oregon							0	0
Pennsylvania	3,737	1,706	795	211	403	64	0	0
Rhode Island	948	380	108	48	17	5	0	0
South Carolina	107,094	146,151	196,365	258,475	315,401	327,038	384,984	402,406
Tennessee	3,417	13,584	44,535	80,107	141,603	183,059	239,459	275,719
Texas							58,161	182,566
Utah							26	29
Vermont	0	0	0	0	0	0	0	0
Virginia (Note: Not including the Virginia counties that formed the new state of West Virginia in 1863, but includes the enslaved population in the returned land that had been donated to form the District of Columbia.)	287,959	339,499	383,521	411,886	453,698	431,873	452,028	472,494
Washington						0	0	0
West Virginia (Note: These figures are for the Virginia counties that formed the state of West Virginia in 1863.)	4,668	7,172	10,836	15,169	17,673	18,488	20,500	18,371
Wisconsin				0	31	11	0	0
United States	697,681	893,602	1,191,362	1,538,073	2,009,043	2,487,355	3,204,313	3,953,760

=== Total population, 1870 to 1950 ===
Name	1870	1880	1890 (Note: Figures include people on Native American reservations in the United States not otherwise enumerated.)	1900	1910	1920	1930	1940	1950
Alabama	996,992	1,262,505	1,513,401	1,828,697	2,138,093	2,348,174	2,646,248	2,832,961	3,061,743
Alaska		33,426	32,052	63,592	64,356	55,036	59,278	72,524	128,643
American Samoa (Note: From 1930 onward the reported value includes Swains Island, which was incorporated into American Samoa in 1925)					6,100 (Note: Estimate reported with 1910 Census data.)	8,056	10,055	12,908	24,889
Arizona	9,658	40,440	88,243	122,931	204,354	334,162	435,573	499,261	749,587
Arkansas	484,471	802,525	1,128,211	1,311,564	1,574,449	1,752,204	1,854,482	1,949,387	1,909,511
California	560,247	864,694	1,213,398	1,485,053	2,377,549	3,426,861	5,677,251	6,907,387	10,586,223
Colorado	39,864	194,327	413,249	539,700	799,024	939,629	1,035,791	1,123,296	1,325,089
Connecticut	537,454	622,700	746,258	908,420	1,114,756	1,380,631	1,606,903	1,709,242	2,007,280
Delaware	125,015	146,608	168,493	184,735	202,322	223,003	238,380	266,505	318,085
District of Columbia	131,700	177,624	230,392	278,718	331,069	437,571	486,869	663,091	802,178
Florida	187,748	269,493	391,422	528,542	752,619	968,470	1,468,211	1,897,414	2,771,305
Georgia	1,184,109	1,542,180	1,837,353	2,216,331	2,609,121	2,895,832	2,908,506	3,123,723	3,444,578
Guam					11,806	13,275	18,509	22,290	59,498
Hawaii (Note: From 1910 to 1940, U.S. Minor Outlying Islands in the Pacific were enumerated with the Hawaii Territory by the U.S. Census bureau. The values here exclude those island populations not incorporated into the state of Hawaiʻi. (per Guide to 2010 State and Local Census Geography: Hawaii (Report). Washington, D.C.: U.S. Census Bureau.))				154,001	191,874 (Note: Total excludes counts for Midway Atoll)	255,881	368,300	422,738 (Note: Total excludes counts for Baker, Canton, Enderbury, Howland, and Jarvis islands and Johnston, Midway, Palmyra, and Wake atolls.)	499,794
Idaho	14,999	32,610	88,548	161,772	325,594	431,866	445,032	524,873	588,637
Illinois	2,539,891	3,077,871	3,826,352	4,821,550	5,638,591	6,485,280	7,630,654	7,897,241	8,712,176
Indiana	1,680,637	1,978,301	2,192,404	2,516,462	2,700,876	2,930,390	3,238,503	3,427,796	3,934,224
Iowa	1,194,020	1,624,615	1,912,297	2,231,853	2,224,771	2,404,021	2,470,939	2,538,268	2,621,073
Kansas	364,399	996,096	1,428,108	1,470,495	1,690,949	1,769,257	1,880,999	1,801,028	1,905,299
Kentucky	1,321,011	1,648,690	1,858,635	2,147,174	2,289,905	2,416,630	2,614,589	2,845,627	2,944,806
Louisiana	726,915	939,946	1,118,588	1,381,625	1,656,388	1,798,509	2,101,593	2,363,880	2,683,516
Maine	626,915	648,936	661,086	694,466	742,371	768,014	797,423	847,226	913,774
Maryland	780,894	934,943	1,042,390	1,188,044	1,295,346	1,449,661	1,631,526	1,821,244	2,343,001
Massachusetts	1,457,351	1,783,085	2,238,947	2,805,346	3,366,416	3,852,356	4,249,614	4,316,721	4,690,514
Michigan	1,184,059	1,636,937	2,093,890	2,420,982	2,810,173	3,668,412	4,842,325	5,256,106	6,371,766
Minnesota	439,706	780,773	1,310,283	1,751,394	2,075,708	2,387,125	2,563,953	2,792,300	2,982,483
Mississippi	827,922	1,131,597	1,289,600	1,551,270	1,797,114	1,790,618	2,009,821	2,183,796	2,178,914
Missouri	1,721,295	2,168,380	2,679,185	3,106,665	3,293,335	3,404,055	3,629,367	3,784,664	3,954,653
Montana	20,595	39,159	142,924	243,329	376,053	548,889	537,606	559,456	591,024
Nebraska	122,993	452,402	1,062,656	1,066,300	1,192,214	1,296,372	1,377,963	1,315,834	1,325,510
Nevada	42,941	62,266	47,355	42,335	81,875	77,407	91,058	110,247	160,083
New Hampshire	318,300	346,991	376,530	411,588	430,572	443,083	465,293	491,524	533,242
New Jersey	906,096	1,131,116	1,444,933	1,883,669	2,537,167	3,155,900	4,041,334	4,160,165	4,835,329
New Mexico	91,874	119,565	160,282	195,310	327,301	360,350	423,317	531,818	681,187
New York	4,382,759	5,082,871	6,003,174	7,268,894	9,113,614	10,385,227	12,588,066	13,479,142	14,830,192
North Carolina	1,071,361	1,399,750	1,617,949	1,893,810	2,206,287	2,559,123	3,170,276	3,571,623	4,061,929
North Dakota	2,405	36,909	190,983	319,146	577,056	646,872	680,845	641,935	619,636
Ohio	2,665,260	3,198,062	3,672,329	4,157,545	4,767,121	5,759,394	6,646,697	6,907,612	7,946,627
Oklahoma (Note: The 1890 and 1900 figures are the combined total for the Oklahoma Territory and Indian Territory, which were combined when Oklahoma became a state in 1907 (per Census Bulletin 89: Population of Oklahoma and Indian Territory (PDF). Washington, D.C.: Government Printing Office. 1907.). The 1900 figures include Greer County, which previously had been claimed by Texas.)			258,657 (Note: Oklahoma Territory population 78,475; Indian Territory population 180,182.)	790,391 (Note: Oklahoma Territory population 398,331; Indian Territory population 392,060.)	1,657,155	2,028,283	2,396,040	2,336,434	2,233,351
Oregon	90,923	174,768	317,704	413,536	672,765	783,389	953,786	1,089,684	1,521,341
Pennsylvania	3,521,951	4,282,891	5,258,113	6,302,115	7,665,111	8,720,017	9,631,350	9,900,180	10,498,012
Puerto Rico					1,118,012	1,299,809	1,543,913	1,869,255	2,210,703
Rhode Island	217,353	276,531	345,506	428,556	542,610	604,397	687,497	713,346	791,896
South Carolina	705,606	995,577	1,151,149	1,340,316	1,515,400	1,683,724	1,738,765	1,899,804	2,117,027
South Dakota	11,776	98,268	348,600	401,570	583,888	636,547	692,849	642,961	652,740
Tennessee	1,258,520	1,542,359	1,767,518	2,020,616	2,184,789	2,337,885	2,616,556	2,915,841	3,291,718
Texas	818,579	1,591,749	2,235,527	3,048,710	3,896,542	4,663,228	5,824,715	6,414,824	7,711,194
U.S. Virgin Islands						25,346 (Note: Extrapolated value reported in 1940 Census)	22,012	39,467	51,827
Utah	86,786	143,963	210,779	276,749	373,351	449,396	507,847	550,310	688,862
Vermont	330,551	332,286	332,422	343,641	355,956	352,428	359,611	359,231	377,747
Virginia	1,225,163	1,512,565	1,655,980	1,854,184	2,061,612	2,309,187	2,421,851	2,677,773	3,318,680
Washington	23,955	75,116	357,232	518,103	1,141,990	1,356,621	1,563,396	1,736,191	2,378,963
West Virginia	442,014	618,457	762,794	958,800	1,221,119	1,463,701	1,729,205	1,901,974	2,005,552
Wisconsin	1,054,670	1,315,497	1,693,330	2,069,042	2,333,860	2,632,067	2,939,006	3,137,587	3,434,575
Wyoming	9,118	20,789	62,555	92,531	145,965	194,402	225,565	250,742	290,529
United States	38,558,371	50,155,783 (Note: Total excludes population of Alaska)	62,947,714 (Note: Total for 1890 includes 62,622,250 persons enumerated in the states and territories, plus 325,464 persons in Indian Territory and on reservations not otherwise counted.)	75,994,575 (Note: Total excludes population of Alaska and Hawaii)	91,972,266 (Note: Total excludes population of Alaska, Guam, Hawaii, Puerto Rico, and U.S. Minor Outlying Islands)	105,710,620 (Note: Total excludes population of Alaska, American Samoa, Guam, Hawaii, Panama Canal Zone, the Philippines, Puerto Rico, U.S. Virgin Islands, and U.S. Minor Outlying Islands)	122,775,046	131,669,275	150,697,361 (Note: Total excludes population of Alaska, American Samoa, Guam, Hawaii, Panama Canal Zone, Puerto Rico, U.S. Virgin Islands, and U.S. Minor Outlying Islands)

=== Total population, 1960 to 2020 ===
Name	1960	1970	1980	1990	2000	2010	2020
Alabama	3,266,740	3,444,165	3,893,888	4,040,587	4,447,100	4,779,736	5,024,279
Alaska	226,167	300,382	401,851	550,043	626,932	710,231	733,391
American Samoa	20,051	27,159	32,297	46,773	57,291	55,519	49,710
Arizona	1,302,161	1,770,900	2,718,215	3,665,228	5,130,632	6,392,017	7,151,502
Arkansas	1,786,272	1,923,295	2,286,435	2,350,725	2,673,400	2,915,918	3,011,524
California	15,717,204	19,953,134	23,667,902	29,760,021	33,871,648	37,253,956	39,538,223
Colorado	1,753,947	2,207,259	2,889,964	3,294,394	4,301,261	5,029,196	5,773,714
Connecticut	2,535,234	3,031,709	3,107,576	3,287,116	3,405,565	3,574,097	3,608,298
Delaware	446,292	548,104	594,338	666,168	783,600	897,934	989,948
District of Columbia	763,956	756,510	638,333	606,900	572,059	601,723	689,545
Florida	4,951,560	6,789,443	9,746,324	12,937,926	15,982,378	18,801,310	21,538,187
Georgia	3,943,116	4,589,575	5,463,105	6,478,216	8,186,453	9,687,653	10,711,908
Guam	67,044	84,966	105,979	133,152	154,805	159,358	153,836
Hawaii	632,772	768,561	964,691	1,108,229	1,211,537	1,360,301	1,455,271
Idaho	667,191	712,567	943,935	1,006,749	1,293,953	1,567,582	1,839,106
Illinois	10,081,158	11,113,976	11,426,518	11,430,602	12,419,293	12,830,632	12,812,508
Indiana	4,662,498	5,193,669	5,490,224	5,544,159	6,080,485	6,483,802	6,785,528
Iowa	2,757,537	2,824,376	2,913,808	2,776,755	2,926,324	3,046,355	3,190,369
Kansas	2,178,611	2,246,578	2,363,679	2,477,574	2,688,418	2,853,118	2,937,880
Kentucky	3,038,156	3,218,706	3,660,777	3,685,296	4,041,769	4,339,367	4,505,836
Louisiana	3,257,022	3,641,306	4,205,900	4,219,973	4,468,976	4,533,372	4,657,757
Maine	969,265	992,048	1,124,660	1,227,928	1,274,923	1,328,361	1,362,359
Maryland	3,100,689	3,922,399	4,216,975	4,781,468	5,296,486	5,773,552	6,177,224
Massachusetts	5,148,578	5,689,170	5,737,037	6,016,425	6,349,097	6,547,629	7,029,917
Michigan	7,823,194	8,875,083	9,262,078	9,295,297	9,938,444	9,883,640	10,077,331
Minnesota	3,413,864	3,804,971	4,075,970	4,375,099	4,919,479	5,303,925	5,706,494
Mississippi	2,178,141	2,216,912	2,520,638	2,573,216	2,844,658	2,967,297	2,961,279
Missouri	4,319,813	4,676,501	4,916,686	5,117,073	5,595,211	5,988,927	6,154,913
Montana	674,767	694,409	786,690	799,065	902,195	989,415	1,084,225
Nebraska	1,411,330	1,483,493	1,569,825	1,578,385	1,711,263	1,826,341	1,961,504
Nevada	285,278	488,738	800,493	1,201,833	1,998,257	2,700,551	3,104,614
New Hampshire	606,921	737,681	920,610	1,109,252	1,235,786	1,316,470	1,377,529
New Jersey	6,066,782	7,168,164	7,364,823	7,730,188	8,414,350	8,791,894	9,288,994
New Mexico	951,023	1,016,000	1,302,894	1,515,069	1,819,046	2,059,179	2,117,522
New York	16,782,304	18,236,967	17,558,072	17,990,455	18,976,457	19,378,102	20,201,249
North Carolina	4,556,155	5,082,059	5,881,766	6,628,637	8,049,313	9,535,483	10,439,388
North Dakota	632,446	617,761	652,717	638,800	642,200	672,591	779,094
Northern Mariana Islands (Note: Figures recorded as part of the Pacific Trust Territories by the census of 1970 are listed here as belonging to the Northern Mariana Islands.)	8,290 (Note: From Census of the Trust Territory of the Pacific Islands 1958, which the 1960 Census used for reporting total population of the Pacific Trust Territory)	9,460	16,780	43,345	69,221	53,883	47,329
Ohio	9,706,397	10,652,017	10,797,630	10,847,115	11,353,140	11,536,504	11,799,448
Oklahoma	2,328,284	2,559,229	3,025,290	3,145,585	3,450,654	3,751,351	3,959,353
Oregon	1,768,687	2,091,385	2,633,105	2,842,321	3,421,399	3,831,074	4,237,256
Pennsylvania	11,319,366	11,793,909	11,863,895	11,881,643	12,281,054	12,702,379	13,002,700
Puerto Rico	2,349,544	2,712,033	3,196,520	3,522,037	3,808,610	3,725,789	3,285,874
Rhode Island	859,488	946,725	947,154	1,003,464	1,048,319	1,052,567	1,097,379
South Carolina	2,382,594	2,590,516	3,121,820	3,486,703	4,012,012	4,625,364	5,118,425
South Dakota	680,514	665,507	690,768	696,004	754,844	814,180	886,667
Tennessee	3,567,089	3,923,687	4,591,120	4,877,185	5,689,283	6,346,105	6,910,840
Texas	9,579,677	11,196,730	14,229,191	16,986,510	20,851,820	25,145,561	29,145,505
U.S. Virgin Islands	32,099	62,468	96,569	101,809	108,612	106,405	87,146
Utah	890,627	1,059,273	1,461,037	1,722,850	2,233,169	2,763,885	3,271,616
Vermont	389,881	444,330	511,456	562,758	608,827	625,741	643,077
Virginia	3,966,949	4,648,494	5,346,818	6,187,358	7,078,515	8,001,024	8,631,393
Washington	2,853,214	3,409,169	4,132,156	4,866,692	5,894,121	6,724,540	7,705,281
West Virginia	1,860,421	1,744,237	1,949,644	1,793,477	1,808,344	1,852,994	1,793,716
Wisconsin	3,951,777	4,417,731	4,705,767	4,891,769	5,363,675	5,686,986	5,893,718
Wyoming	330,066	332,416	469,557	453,588	493,782	563,626	576,851
United States	179,323,175 (Note: Total excludes population of American Samoa, Guam, Panama Canal Zone, Puerto Rico, U.S. Virgin Islands, and U.S. Minor Outlying Islands)	203,211,926 (Note: Total excludes population of American Samoa, Guam, Northern Mariana Islands, Pacific Trust Territory, Palau, Panama Canal Zone, Puerto Rico, U.S. Virgin Islands, and U.S. Minor Outlying Islands)	226,545,805 (Note: Total excludes population of American Samoa, Guam, Northern Mariana Islands, Pacific Trust Territory, Palau, Puerto Rico, U.S. Virgin Islands, and U.S. Minor Outlying Islands)	248,709,873 (Note: Total excludes population of American Samoa, Guam, Northern Mariana Islands, Palau, Puerto Rico, U.S. Virgin Islands, and U.S. Minor Outlying Islands)	281,421,906 (Note: Total excludes population of American Samoa, Guam, Northern Mariana Islands, Puerto Rico, U.S. Virgin Islands, and U.S. Minor Outlying Islands)	308,745,538	331,449,281

== Minor Outlying Islands population, 1910 to 2000, census data ==
Several small island territories are included in the U.S. Census Bureau's Island Areas region as U.S. Minor Outlying Islands. These mostly lack permanent residents, but have been included in some census counts since 1910. Prior to 1959, most of the Pacific minor island territories were enumerated with the Hawaii Territory, but not included in the territory's population count. Minor Outlying Islands that have never had a population enumerated by the U.S. Census Bureau are not included. Since 2000, the U.S. Census Bureau has not reported data for the Minor Outlying Islands as part of its standard data products.

Name	Acquired	1910	1920	1930	1940	1950	1960	1970	1980	1990	2000
Baker, Howland, and Jarvis Islands	1935				10 (Note: 3 people each on Baker and Jarvis; 4 people on Howland)						
Johnston Atoll	1856				69	46	156	1,007	327	173	315
Midway Atoll	1867	35	31	36	437	416	2,356	2,220	453	13	0
Palmyra (Note: Part of the Hawaii Territory prior to 1959; remained a separate territory after Hawaiʻi gained statehood.)	1912				32						
Wake Island	1899				0	349	1,097	1,647	302	7	1

== U.S. federally affiliated overseas population, 1900 to 2020, census data ==
Since 1900, the U.S. Census Bureau has worked to count Americans living overseas, including those soldiers and sailors overseas, merchants on vessels at sea, and diplomats. (Counts were also provided in the 1830 and 1840 Censuses.) Attempts to count private citizens have been made, too, but with only minimal success. In 1970 and since 1990, the "U.S. Federally Affiliated Overseas Population" — essentially citizens serving in military, diplomatic, and other federal agency postings overseas — have been counted based upon federal records. For the purpose of apportionment, they are assigned to their on-record home state. Figures prior to 2000 are from Americans Overseas in U.S. Censuses. Data for 2000 and 2010 is from a 2012 Census assessment report, and 2020 data is from that year's Census.

1830	1840	1900	1910	1920	1930	1940	1950	1960	1970	1980	1990	2000	2010	2020
5,318	6,100	91,219	55,608	117,238	89,453	118,933	481,545	1,374,421	1,737,836	995,546	925,845	576,367	1,042,523	350,686

== Former territories, 1910 to 1990, census data ==
Several territories and possessions held by the United States during the 1800s and 1900s gained independence or were transferred to other nations. The populations of these former territories as reported in the census are listed below.

Name	Acquired	Relinquished	1910	1920	1930	1940	1950	1960	1970	1980	1990
Canton and Enderbury Islands (Note: This territory no longer exists.)	1937	1979 (Note: Relinquished to Kiribati in 1979.)				44 (Note: 4 people on Enderbury; 40 people on Canton)	272 (Note: All on Canton; Enderbury reported no inhabitants)	320	0		
Corn Islands (Note: Population figures provided to U.S. Census Bureau by the government of Nicaragua.)	1914	1970 (Note: Leased from Nicaragua for 99 years, but lease terminated in 1970)				1,523	1,304	1,872			
Pacific Trust Territory (Note: Excludes counts for Northern Mariana Islands and Palau.)	1947	1986 (Note: The trusteeship was ended in 1986.)						53,447	70,270	104,033	
Palau (Note: Figures recorded as part of the Pacific Trust Territories by the census of 1970 and 1980 are listed here as belonging to Palau.)	1947	1994 (Note: The Republic of Palau became independent from the United States in 1994.)						8,987	11,210	12,116	15,122
Panama Canal Zone	1903	1979 (Note: The territory was abolished in 1979.)	62,810 (Note: 1912 census conducted by he Department of Civil Administration of the Isthmian Canal Commission; reported with 1910 Census data.)	22,858	39,467	51,827	52,822	42,112	44,198		
Philippines (Note: The Census Bureau never formally enumerated the Philippine Islands when they were a U.S. territorial possession; however, the 1940 Census included data from the 1939 Census of the Commonwealth of the Philippines, including extrapolated population figures for 1930 and 1920.)	1899	1946 (Note: The United States officially recognized Philippine independence in 1946)	7,635,426 (Note: 1903 census conducted by the Philippine Commission; reported with 1910 Census data.)	10,599,000	13,513,000	16,356,000					
Swan Islands	1856	1971 (Note: In 1971, the United States relinquished its claim to the islands, allowing Hondorus to take full control of them.)					36	28	22		

Interactive semi-log plot of historical population of the 50 states of USA and the District of Columbia from 1900 to 2015 according to Federal Reserve Economic Data categorised by US census region. In theSVGfile, hover over a graph, its state abbreviation, its map or its region label to highlight it (and in SMIL-enabled browsers, click to select/deselect it).

== 2000 to 2025, Intercensus Data ==
=== 2000 to 2009 ===
Name	2000	2001	2002	2003	2004	2005	2006	2007	2008	2009
Alabama	4,452,173	4,467,634	4,480,089	4,503,491	4,530,729	4,569,805	4,628,981	4,672,840	4,718,206	4,757,938
Alaska	627,963	633,714	642,337	648,414	659,286	666,946	675,302	680,300	687,455	698,895
Arizona	5,160,586	5,273,477	5,396,255	5,510,364	5,652,404	5,839,077	6,029,141	6,167,681	6,280,362	6,343,154
Arkansas	2,678,588	2,691,571	2,705,927	2,724,816	2,749,686	2,781,097	2,821,761	2,848,650	2,874,554	2,896,843
California	33,987,977	34,479,458	34,871,843	35,253,159	35,574,576	35,827,943	36,021,202	36,250,311	36,604,337	36,961,229
Colorado	4,326,921	4,425,687	4,490,406	4,528,732	4,575,013	4,631,888	4,720,423	4,803,868	4,889,730	4,972,195
Connecticut	3,411,777	3,432,835	3,458,749	3,484,336	3,496,094	3,506,956	3,517,460	3,527,270	3,545,579	3,561,807
Delaware	786,373	795,699	806,169	818,003	830,803	845,150	859,268	871,749	883,874	891,730
District of Columbia	572,046	574,504	573,158	568,502	567,754	567,136	570,681	574,404	580,236	592,228
Florida	16,047,515	16,356,966	16,689,370	17,004,085	17,415,318	17,842,038	18,166,990	18,367,842	18,527,305	18,652,644
Georgia	8,227,303	8,377,038	8,508,256	8,622,793	8,769,252	8,925,922	9,155,813	9,349,988	9,504,843	9,620,846
Hawaii	1,213,519	1,225,948	1,239,613	1,251,154	1,273,569	1,292,729	1,309,731	1,315,675	1,332,213	1,346,717
Idaho	1,299,430	1,319,962	1,340,372	1,363,380	1,391,802	1,428,241	1,468,669	1,505,105	1,534,320	1,554,439
Illinois	12,434,161	12,488,445	12,525,556	12,556,006	12,589,773	12,609,903	12,643,955	12,695,866	12,747,038	12,796,778
Indiana	6,091,866	6,127,760	6,155,967	6,196,638	6,233,007	6,278,616	6,332,669	6,379,599	6,424,806	6,459,325
Iowa	2,929,067	2,931,997	2,934,234	2,941,999	2,953,635	2,964,454	2,982,644	2,999,212	3,016,734	3,032,870
Kansas	2,693,681	2,702,162	2,713,535	2,723,004	2,734,373	2,745,299	2,762,931	2,783,785	2,808,076	2,832,704
Kentucky	4,049,021	4,068,132	4,089,875	4,117,170	4,146,101	4,182,742	4,219,239	4,256,672	4,289,878	4,317,074
Louisiana	4,471,885	4,477,875	4,497,267	4,521,042	4,552,238	4,576,628	4,302,665	4,375,581	4,435,586	4,491,648
Maine	1,277,072	1,285,692	1,295,960	1,306,513	1,313,688	1,318,787	1,323,619	1,327,040	1,330,509	1,329,590
Maryland	5,311,034	5,374,691	5,440,389	5,496,269	5,546,935	5,592,379	5,627,367	5,653,408	5,684,965	5,730,388
Massachusetts	6,361,104	6,397,634	6,417,206	6,422,565	6,412,281	6,403,290	6,410,084	6,431,559	6,468,967	6,517,613
Michigan	9,952,450	9,991,120	10,015,710	10,041,152	10,055,315	10,051,137	10,036,081	10,001,284	9,946,889	9,901,591
Minnesota	4,933,692	4,982,796	5,018,935	5,053,572	5,087,713	5,119,598	5,163,555	5,207,203	5,247,018	5,281,203
Mississippi	2,848,353	2,852,994	2,858,681	2,868,312	2,889,010	2,905,943	2,904,978	2,928,350	2,947,806	2,958,774
Missouri	5,607,285	5,641,142	5,674,825	5,709,403	5,747,741	5,790,300	5,842,704	5,887,612	5,923,916	5,961,088
Montana	903,773	906,961	911,667	919,630	930,009	940,102	952,692	964,706	976,415	983,982
Nebraska	1,713,820	1,719,836	1,728,292	1,738,643	1,749,370	1,761,497	1,772,693	1,783,440	1,796,378	1,812,683
Nevada	2,018,741	2,098,399	2,173,791	2,248,850	2,346,222	2,432,143	2,522,658	2,601,072	2,653,630	2,684,665
New Hampshire	1,239,882	1,255,517	1,269,089	1,279,840	1,290,121	1,298,492	1,308,389	1,312,540	1,315,906	1,316,102
New Jersey	8,430,621	8,492,671	8,552,643	8,601,402	8,634,561	8,651,974	8,661,679	8,677,885	8,711,090	8,755,602
New Mexico	1,821,204	1,831,690	1,855,309	1,877,574	1,903,808	1,932,274	1,962,137	1,990,070	2,010,662	2,036,802
New York	19,001,780	19,082,838	19,137,800	19,175,939	19,171,567	19,132,610	19,104,631	19,132,335	19,212,436	19,307,066
North Carolina	8,081,614	8,210,122	8,326,201	8,422,501	8,553,152	8,705,407	8,917,270	9,118,037	9,309,449	9,449,566
North Dakota	642,023	639,062	638,168	638,817	644,705	646,089	649,422	652,822	657,569	664,968
Ohio	11,363,543	11,387,404	11,407,889	11,434,788	11,452,251	11,463,320	11,481,213	11,500,468	11,515,391	11,528,896
Oklahoma	3,454,365	3,467,100	3,489,080	3,504,892	3,525,233	3,548,597	3,594,090	3,634,349	3,668,976	3,717,572
Oregon	3,429,708	3,467,937	3,513,424	3,547,376	3,569,463	3,613,202	3,670,883	3,722,417	3,768,748	3,808,600
Pennsylvania	12,284,173	12,298,970	12,331,031	12,374,658	12,410,722	12,449,990	12,510,809	12,563,937	12,612,285	12,666,858
Rhode Island	1,050,268	1,057,142	1,065,995	1,071,342	1,074,579	1,067,916	1,063,096	1,057,315	1,055,003	1,053,646
South Carolina	4,024,223	4,064,995	4,107,795	4,150,297	4,210,921	4,270,150	4,357,847	4,444,110	4,528,996	4,589,872
South Dakota	755,844	757,972	760,020	763,729	770,396	775,493	783,033	791,623	799,124	807,067
Tennessee	5,703,719	5,750,789	5,795,918	5,847,812	5,910,809	5,991,057	6,088,766	6,175,727	6,247,411	6,306,019
Texas	20,944,499	21,319,622	21,690,325	22,030,931	22,394,023	22,778,123	23,359,580	23,831,983	24,309,039	24,801,761
Utah	2,244,502	2,283,715	2,324,815	2,360,137	2,401,580	2,457,719	2,525,507	2,597,746	2,663,029	2,723,421
Vermont	609,618	612,223	615,442	617,858	619,920	621,215	622,892	623,481	624,151	624,817
Virginia	7,105,817	7,198,362	7,286,873	7,366,977	7,475,575	7,577,105	7,673,725	7,751,000	7,833,496	7,925,937
Washington	5,910,512	5,985,722	6,052,349	6,104,115	6,178,645	6,257,305	6,370,753	6,461,587	6,562,231	6,667,426
West Virginia	1,807,021	1,801,481	1,805,414	1,812,295	1,816,438	1,820,492	1,827,912	1,834,052	1,840,310	1,847,775
Wisconsin	5,373,999	5,406,835	5,445,162	5,479,203	5,514,026	5,546,166	5,577,655	5,610,775	5,640,996	5,669,264
Wyoming	494,300	494,657	500,017	503,453	509,106	514,157	522,667	534,876	546,043	559,851
United States	282,162,411	284,968,955	287,625,193	290,107,933	292,805,298	295,516,599	298,379,912	301,231,207	304,093,966	306,771,529

=== 2010 to 2019 ===
Name	2010	2011	2012	2013	2014	2015	2016	2017	2018	2019
Alabama	4,788,095	4,812,576	4,839,947	4,865,253	4,887,757	4,909,177	4,931,579	4,953,096	4,977,088	5,003,778
Alaska	714,015	722,513	731,106	738,054	737,634	739,120	743,397	741,937	737,710	734,820
Arizona	6,401,304	6443158	6,501,800	6,555,926	6,629,890	6,705,607	6,793,278	6,872,380	6,964,300	7,067,695
Arkansas	2,921,546	2,938,773	2,948,793	2,954,563	2,961,050	2,970,210	2,980,475	2,990,702	2,997,195	3,004,206
California	37,322,523	37,651,212	37,971,412	38,292,557	38,637,421	38,966,939	39,223,789	39,424,315	39,535,920	39,547,995
Colorado	5,046,928	5,118,837	5,188,139	5,262,801	5,342,212	5,441,452	5,528,510	5,599,635	5,676,918	5,735,797
Connecticut	3,580,281	3,594,181	3,605,215	3,610,238	3,614,584	3,611,891	3,607,614	3,607,550	3,611,229	3,607,133
Delaware	899,773	908,220	916,654	925,704	935,278	944,716	953,146	961,604	971,152	981,340
District of Columbia	604,718	617,465	630,643	644,203	653,986	665,135	673,428	680,670	685,476	687,320
Florida	18,842,405	19,036,879	19,268,256	19,502,928	19,790,139	20,140,379	20,533,473	20,868,335	21,131,181	21,353,320
Georgia	9,712,616	9,805,666	9,907,250	9,980,892	10,078,133	10,191,912	10,318,636	10,428,854	10,532,841	10,643,103
Hawaii	1,365,117	1,385,141	1,405,255	1,423,345	1,434,323	1,446,452	1,456,816	1,458,161	1,459,965	1,456,943
Idaho	1,571,339	1,586,880	1,600,611	1,618,841	1,641,124	1,663,458	1,697,093	1,734,888	1,769,305	1,808,378
Illinois	12,845,460	12,892,409	12,927,420	12,959,880	12,968,905	12,963,110	12,944,999	12,922,894	12,887,397	12,849,440
Indiana	6,491,385	6,521,409	6,546,485	6,581,401	6,610,174	6,628,925	6,658,719	6,686,218	6,725,960	6,761,818
Iowa	3,051,473	3,070,048	3,082,748	3,102,460	3,121,790	3,136,310	3,149,607	3,162,752	3,171,540	3,183,858
Kansas	2,858,835	2,872,529	2,891,164	2,901,727	2,911,564	2,922,703	2,927,251	2,927,448	2,931,587	2,933,756
Kentucky	4,349,159	4,374,302	4,394,147	4,415,978	4,428,854	4,443,778	4,457,755	4,475,829	4,487,302	4,498,163
Louisiana	4,544,804	4,577,089	4,603,590	4,628,239	4,648,813	4,670,550	4,685,576	4,678,580	4,670,033	4,664,544
Maine	1,327,967	1,330,060	1,330,954	1,332,673	1,336,617	1,335,768	1,340,292	1,344,956	1,350,606	1,357,523
Maryland	5,791,715	5,854,930	5,914,854	5,963,434	6,010,059	6,050,280	6,080,556	6,113,486	6,139,211	6,163,769
Massachusetts	6,569,724	6,630,673	6,693,932	6,757,991	6,820,869	6,866,661	6,909,664	6,959,114	6,994,446	7,016,781
Michigan	9,880,111	9,895,652	9,921,001	9,947,598	9,974,914	9,987,448	10,017,194	10,049,914	10,070,532	10,078,126
Minnesota	5,312,197	5,352,946	5,388,902	5,431,187	5,474,193	5,510,593	5,557,028	5,606,013	5,650,556	5,686,910
Mississippi	2,970,367	2,977,902	2,982,356	2,986,599	2,987,656	2,985,000	2,984,364	2,983,448	2,974,657	2,969,008
Missouri	5,996,167	6,011,574	6,026,733	6,044,008	6,060,462	6,077,056	6,093,343	6,113,654	6,128,572	6,143,374
Montana	990,874	998,243	1,005,475	1,016,046	1,025,126	1,034,544	1,045,768	1,058,073	1,066,610	1,075,495
Nebraska	1,830,194	1,843,937	1,859,140	1,873,681	1,890,242	1,904,766	1,921,616	1,934,551	1,945,483	1,954,962
Nevada	2,701,888	2,710,129	2,739,290	2,769,188	2,808,779	2,855,986	2,904,614	2,954,768	3,011,007	3,068,665
New Hampshire	1,317,105	1,321,939	1,327,372	1,331,163	1,339,344	1,343,764	1,351,178	1,359,076	1,364,941	1,371,857
New Jersey	8,809,368	8,878,245	8,935,248	8,987,175	9,036,406	9,079,218	9,122,374	9,176,713	9,220,072	9,259,376
New Mexico	2,064,898	2,082,130	2,090,282	2,096,538	2,095,081	2,096,056	2,099,682	2,101,111	2,103,161	2,110,180
New York	19,420,354	19,602,134	19,758,616	19,892,558	20,001,317	20,087,023	20,148,134	20,187,407	20,219,472	20,220,321
North Carolina	9,571,037	9,641,131	9,719,755	9,800,429	9,876,774	9,962,464	10,072,775	10,172,498	10,273,864	10,369,657
North Dakota	675,097	687,257	705,347	727,655	744,628	762,814	764,781	766,807	771,499	776,548
Ohio	11,541,932	11,558,178	11,573,400	11,612,081	11,648,921	11,674,622	11,702,354	11,737,959	11,763,104	11,788,679
Oklahoma	3,759,558	3,786,536	3,815,196	3,847,936	3,871,400	3,900,900	3,916,688	3,920,316	3,928,371	3,943,727
Oregon	3,837,609	3,872,651	3,900,064	3,924,055	3,965,375	4,018,453	4,093,165	4,147,171	4,183,398	4,215,959
Pennsylvania	12,716,596	12,773,059	12,816,003	12,847,236	12,880,907	12,899,169	12,918,673	12,945,701	12,980,946	12,991,539
Rhode Island	1,054,975	1,058,746	1,063,756	1,068,358	1,073,245	1,077,555	1,082,431	1,085,105	1,091,824	1,094,580
South Carolina	4,633,669	4,661,744	4,699,358	4,738,067	4,789,723	4,850,136	4,908,404	4,963,742	5,019,607	5,076,874
South Dakota	816,068	823,113	832,730	841,120	847,538	852,029	860,557	870,094	875,247	882,486
Tennessee	6,356,388	6,404,657	6,463,610	6,508,290	6,559,452	6,613,679	6,673,101	6,740,060	6,806,981	6,862,615
Texas	25,238,386	25,627,909	26,052,403	26,433,846	26,903,208	27,394,564	27,825,975	28,188,852	28,508,309	28,856,455
Utah	2,776,212	2,818,798	2,861,360	2,909,190	2,951,948	3,000,449	3,064,277	3,126,779	3,181,595	3,233,028
Vermont	626,366	629,600	630,693	632,859	633,872	635,912	636,397	639,087	640,680	641,847
Virginia	8,025,105	8,107,953	8,197,400	8,270,221	8,334,206	8,390,494	8,445,270	8,503,046	8,547,370	8,597,508
Washington	6,743,680	6,830,840	6,904,658	6,975,001	7,068,971	7,181,417	7,316,788	7,447,469	7,549,002	7,638,923
West Virginia	1,854,404	1,857,305	1,858,706	1,856,588	1,852,948	1,846,270	1,835,935	1,822,742	1,810,572	1,800,441
Wisconsin	5,692,038	5,713,359	5,734,379	5,757,584	5,778,789	5,794,536	5,812,814	5,836,809	5,859,000	5,880,280
Wyoming	564,402	566,844	575,491	580,937	580,959	583,671	582,007	576,240	574,783	575,327
United States	309,378,227	311,839,461	314,339,099	316,726,282	319,257,560	321,815,121	324,353,340	326,608,609	328,529,577	330,226,227

=== 2020 to 2025 ===
Name	2020	2021	2022	2023	2024	2025
Alabama	5,032,962	5,050,058	5,076,868	5,117,850	5,163,055	5,193,088
Alaska	732,906	734,590	733,659	734,654	736,537	737,270
Arizona	7,186,647	7,274,022	7,370,065	7,452,073	7,556,424	7,623,818
Arkansas	3,014,399	3,027,127	3,047,429	3,069,856	3,096,080	3,114,791
California	39,527,808	39,152,927	39,125,347	39,181,667	39,364,774	39,355,309
Colorado	5,786,873	5,814,368	5,853,355	5,912,240	5,988,502	6,012,561
Connecticut	3,579,643	3,607,765	3,618,707	3,641,369	3,674,449	3,688,496
Delaware	991,890	1,005,130	1,020,279	1,035,354	1,050,123	1,059,952
District of Columbia	670,958	669,637	674,501	682,559	691,310	693,645
Florida	21,591,325	21,836,698	22,413,989	22,929,248	23,265,838	23,462,518
Georgia	10,732,595	10,793,038	10,929,992	11,063,669	11,204,208	11,302,748
Hawaii	1,451,130	1,446,909	1,437,812	1,434,950	1,434,952	1,432,820
Idaho	1,849,328	1,904,855	1,942,951	1,970,497	2,000,872	2,029,733
Illinois	12,795,348	12,703,354	12,609,577	12,633,389	12,703,033	12,719,141
Indiana	6,790,290	6,814,223	6,841,491	6,881,373	6,934,754	6,973,333
Iowa	3,191,081	3,199,037	3,201,890	3,214,739	3,230,454	3,238,387
Kansas	2,938,274	2,938,966	2,938,034	2,949,749	2,965,252	2,977,220
Kentucky	4,508,271	4,508,348	4,521,238	4,549,953	4,584,046	4,606,864
Louisiana	4,652,145	4,628,595	4,600,892	4,598,777	4,614,878	4,618,189
Maine	1,364,546	1,379,009	1,391,585	1,401,992	1,408,438	1,414,874
Maryland	6,178,387	6,176,035	6,183,257	6,204,927	6,245,314	6,265,347
Massachusetts	6,985,320	6,996,721	7,025,465	7,073,479	7,138,560	7,154,084
Michigan	10,072,294	10,042,362	10,043,906	10,062,124	10,099,962	10,127,884
Minnesota	5,710,562	5,714,055	5,727,565	5,752,998	5,797,405	5,830,405
Mississippi	2,958,385	2,947,603	2,941,237	2,942,470	2,950,172	2,954,160
Missouri	6,155,074	6,172,551	6,179,285	6,205,956	6,243,544	6,270,541
Montana	1,087,156	1,106,416	1,121,533	1,130,612	1,137,557	1,144,694
Nebraska	1,963,318	1,964,697	1,972,595	1,988,172	2,005,591	2,018,006
Nevada	3,116,851	3,148,472	3,177,672	3,211,077	3,253,543	3,282,188
New Hampshire	1,378,752	1,387,907	1,396,647	1,401,530	1,408,518	1,415,342
New Jersey	9,270,476	9,266,509	9,298,402	9,395,315	9,506,354	9,548,215
New Mexico	2,118,446	2,117,300	2,112,859	2,119,349	2,126,774	2,125,498
New York	20,122,262	19,835,345	19,713,025	19,786,543	20,001,419	20,002,427
North Carolina	10,450,215	10,565,503	10,705,768	10,871,849	11,052,061	11,197,968
North Dakota	779,612	777,977	780,191	787,071	793,387	799,358
Ohio	11,798,534	11,761,443	11,764,950	11,808,390	11,860,621	11,900,510
Oklahoma	3,965,243	3,992,760	4,025,327	4,062,716	4,097,758	4,123,288
Oregon	4,243,544	4,254,691	4,245,964	4,250,392	4,265,324	4,273,586
Pennsylvania	12,995,576	13,016,628	12,984,655	13,009,406	13,045,848	13,059,432
Rhode Island	1,096,487	1,097,381	1,098,275	1,101,183	1,110,415	1,114,521
South Carolina	5,131,992	5,194,346	5,288,957	5,390,798	5,490,316	5,570,274
South Dakota	887,808	896,303	909,156	917,739	927,110	935,094
Tennessee	6,927,736	6,966,687	7,063,325	7,153,029	7,251,291	7,315,076
Texas	29,237,895	29,572,672	30,118,002	30,719,247	31,318,578	31,709,821
Utah	3,283,970	3,339,874	3,393,928	3,449,259	3,502,983	3,538,904
Vermont	642,965	647,238	647,614	647,722	646,521	644,663
Virginia	8,637,303	8,660,007	8,681,038	8,732,034	8,819,642	8,880,107
Washington	7,726,812	7,744,316	7,786,828	7,838,655	7,927,958	8,001,020
West Virginia	1,791,670	1,785,921	1,774,003	1,770,036	1,767,402	1,766,147
Wisconsin	5,897,371	5,882,128	5,903,472	5,930,350	5,957,168	5,972,787
Wyoming	577,669	579,662	581,742	584,666	586,722	588,753
United States	331,578,104	332,100,166	333,996,304	336,755,052	340,003,797	341,784,857

== See also ==
- United States Census
- United States congressional apportionment
- List of U.S. states and territories by population
- List of U.S. states by population density
- List of U.S. states by population growth rate
- List of colonial and pre-Federal U.S. historical population
- Largest cities in the United States by population by decade
- List of largest cities of U.S. states and territories by historical population
