= List of colonial and pre-Federal U.S. historical population =

The Thirteen Colonies (shown in red) in 1775, with modern borders overlaid

This is a list of colonial and pre-Federal U.S. historical population, as estimated by the U.S. Census Bureau based upon historical records and scholarship. The counts are for total population, including persons who were enslaved, but generally excluding Native Americans. According to the Census Bureau, these figures likely undercount enslaved people. Shaded blocks indicate periods before the colony was established or chartered, as well as times when it was part of another colony.

== 1610–1690 ==
Name	Date Established	1610	1620	1630	1640	1650	1660	1670	1680	1690
Connecticut	1636	—	—	—	1,472	4,139	7,980	12,603	17,246	21,645
Delaware	1664	—	—	—	—	185	540	700	1,005	1,482
Georgia	1732	—	—	—	—	—	—	—	—	—
Kentucky	1792	—	—	—	—	—	—	—	—	—
Maine (Note: For 1660 through 1750, the population count for Maine's counties were included with Massachusetts.)	1662	—	—	400	900	1,000	—	—	—	—
Maryland (Note: Includes territory of modern-day Washington, D.C.)	1632	—	—	—	583	4,504	8,426	13,226	17,904	24,024
Massachusetts (Note: Plymouth became part of Massachusetts in 1691) (Note: From 1641 to 1679, New Hampshire was merged with Massachusetts, although a separate population count was maintained.)	1691	—	—	506	8,932	14,037	20,082	30,000	39,752	49,504
New Hampshire	1629	—	—	500	1,055	1,305	1,555	1,805	2,047	4,164
New Jersey	1664	—	—	—	—	—	—	1,000	3,400	8,000
New York	1664	—	—	350	1,930	4,116	4,936	5,754	9,830	13,909
North Carolina (Note: From 1629 to 1712, North Carolina and South Carolina were a single colony, the Province of Carolina.)	1629	—	—	—	—	—	1,000	3,850	5,430	7,600
Pennsylvania	1681	—	—	—	—	—	—	—	680	11,450
Plymouth	1620	—	102	390	1,020	1,566	1,980	5,333	6,400	7,424
Rhode Island	1663	—	—	—	300	785	1,539	2,155	3,017	4,224
South Carolina	1629	—	—	—	—	—	—	200	1,200	3,900
Tennessee	1790	—	—	—	—	—	—	—	—	—
Vermont	1777	—	—	—	—	—	—	—	—	—
Virginia (Note: Includes portions of modern-day West Virginia.)	1606	350	2,200	2,500	10,442	18,731	27,020	35,309	43,596	53,046
Total		350	2,302	4,246	25,734	49,368	75,058	111,935	151,507	210,372

== 1700–1780 ==
Name	1700	1710	1720	1730	1740	1750	1760	1770	1780
Connecticut	25,970	39,450	58,830	75,530	89,580	111,280	142,470	183,881	206,701
Delaware	2,470	3,645	5,385	9,170	19,870	28,704	33,250	35,496	45,385
Georgia	—	—	—	—	2,021	5,200	9,578	23,375	56,071
Kentucky	—	—	—	—	—	—	—	15,700	45,000
Maine	—	—	—	—	—	—	20,000	31,257	49,133
Maryland	29,604	42,741	66,133	91,113	116,093	141,073	162,267	202,599	245,474
Massachusetts	55,941	62,390	91,008	114,116	151,613	188,000	202,600	235,308	268,627
New Hampshire	4,658	5,681	9,375	10,755	23,256	27,505	39,093	62,396	87,802
New Jersey	14,010	19,872	29,818	37,510	51,373	71,393	93,813	117,431	139,627
New York	19,107	21,625	36,919	48,594	63,665	76,696	117,138	162,920	210,541
North Carolina	10,720	15,120	21,270	30,000	51,760	72,984	110,442	197,200	270,133
Pennsylvania	17,950	24,450	30,962	51,707	85,637	119,666	183,703	240,057	327,305
Rhode Island	5,894	7,573	11,680	16,950	25,255	33,226	45,471	58,196	52,946
South Carolina	5,704	10,883	17,048	30,000	45,000	64,000	94,074	124,244	180,000
Tennessee	—	—	—	—	—	—	—	1,000	10,000
Vermont	—	—	—	—	—	—	—	10,000	47,620
Virginia	58,560	78,281	87,757	114,000	180,440	231,033	339,726	447,016	538,004
Total	250,588	331,711	466,185	629,445	905,563	1,170,760	1,593,625	2,148,076	2,780,369

== See also ==
- Thirteen Colonies
- List of U.S. states and territories by historical population
