= List of most populous cities in the United States by decade =

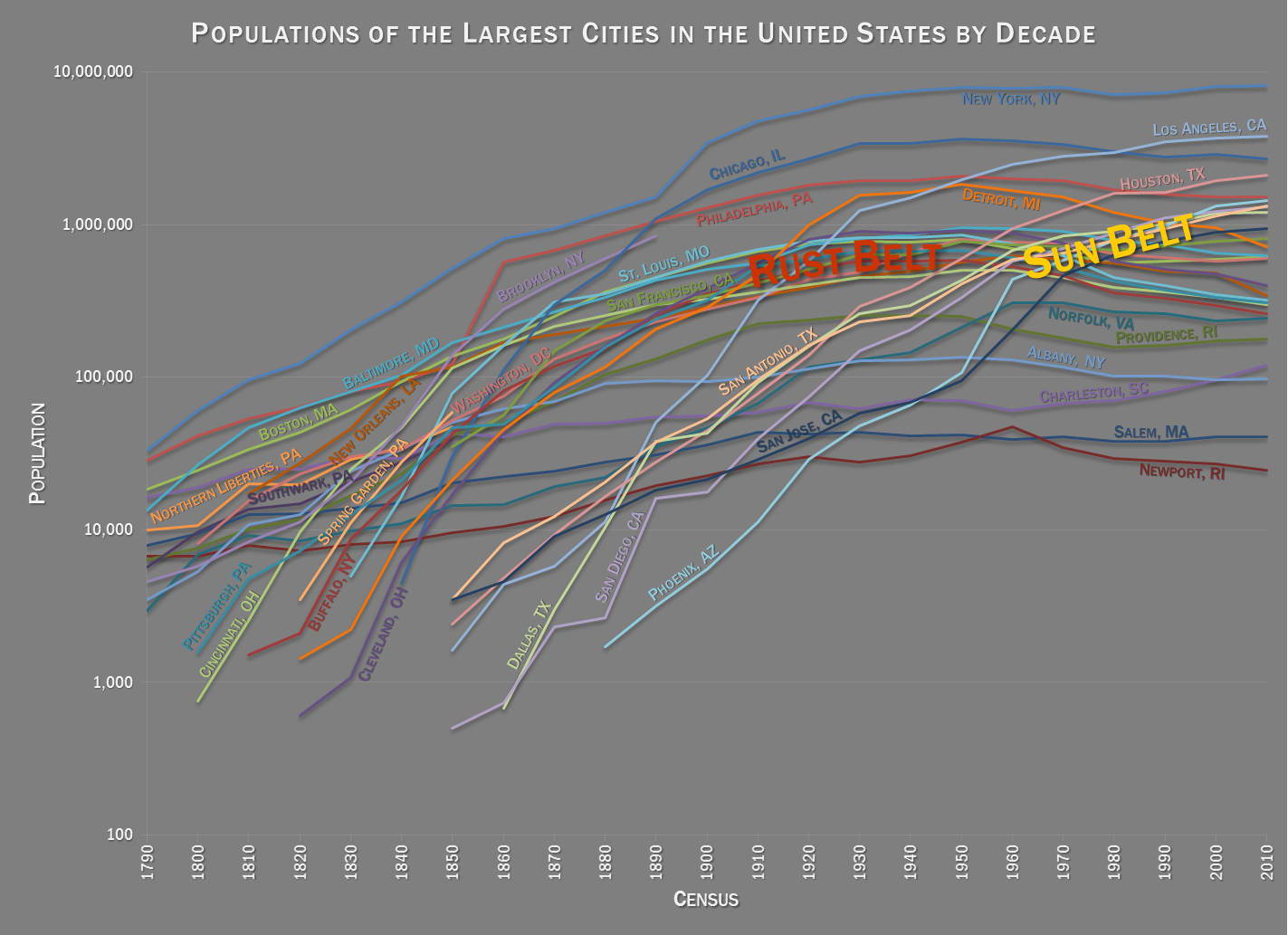
Population as a function of time for cities that have appeared in the top 10 since 1790. Note that the logarithmic scale means that the observed slope gives the percentage growth, not the absolute growth.

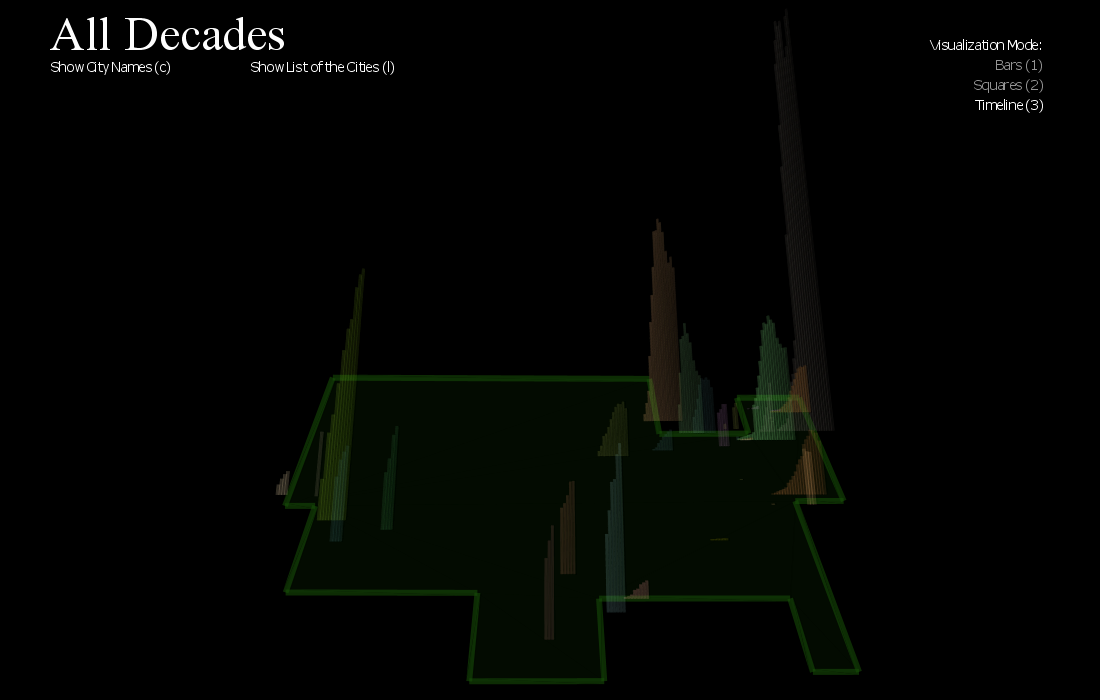
Linear visualization of population of the United States cities only when they are among the top 10

This list tracks and ranks the population of the top 10 largest cities and other urban places in the United States by decade, as reported by each decennial United States census, starting with the 1790 census. For 1790 through 1990, tables are taken from the U.S Census Bureau's "Population of the 100 Largest Cities and Other Urban Places in the United States: 1790 to 1990." For year 2000 rankings, data from the Census Bureau's tally of "Cities with 100,000 or More Population Ranked by Selected Subject" is used. The 2010 rankings are based on the 2010 census results.

The Census Bureau's definition of an "urban place" has included a variety of designations, including city, town, township, village, borough, and municipality. The top 10 urban areas in 1790 consisted of various places designated as cities, towns and townships. The top 10 urban areas in 2010 are all separate incorporated places.

This list generally refers only to the population of individual urban places within their defined limits at the time of the indicated census. Some of these places have since been annexed or merged into other cities. Other places may have expanded their borders due to such annexation or consolidation. For example, after the 1898 consolidation of New York City, the Census Bureau has defined all the boroughs within its city limits as one "urban place". Similarly, Philadelphia's population has included the census counts within both the former urban areas of Northern Liberties, Pennsylvania and Southwark, Pennsylvania ever since Philadelphia's 1854 consolidation.

== 1790 ==
When the United States declared independence in 1776, Philadelphia was its most populous city. By the time the first U.S. census count was completed in 1790, New York City had already grown to be 14% more populous than Philadelphia (though Philadelphia still had the larger metropolitan population in 1790). Note that, in 1790, New York City consisted of the entire island of Manhattan and that Philadelphia only included the most central neighborhoods of the city.

Rank	City	State	Population	Notes
1	New York	New York	33,131 (includes rural areas of Manhattan)	New York has ranked as the city with the highest population in every census count. (Note: Jackson, Kenneth T. (1985). Crabgrass frontier: The suburbanization of the United States. New York: Oxford University Press. ISBN 0-19-504983-7. OCLC 11785435., Chapter 8: "Suburbs Into Neighborhoods: The Rise and Fall of Municipal Annexation.")
2	Philadelphia	Pennsylvania	28,522 (excludes urban neighborhoods outside city proper)	Prior to 1854, the City of Philadelphia only governed the oldest parts of the city, now referred to as Center City.
3	Boston	Massachusetts	18,320	Listed as a town in the 1790 census; now a city since 1822 and is the capital of Massachusetts since 1632.
4	Charleston	South Carolina	16,359	
5	Baltimore	Maryland	13,503	Existed as a town during the time; now an independent city.
6	Northern Liberties District	Pennsylvania	9,913	A neighborhood of Philadelphia annexed in 1854.
7	Salem	Massachusetts	7,921	Listed as a town in the 1790 census; now a city.
8	Newport	Rhode Island	6,716	Listed as a town in the 1790 census; now a city. Only appearance in the top 10.
9	Providence	Rhode Island	6,380	Listed as a town in the 1790 census; now a city.
10	Marblehead	Massachusetts	5,661	Still a town. Only appearance in the top 10.
10	Southwark	Pennsylvania	5,661	A neighborhood of Philadelphia annexed in 1854.

The total population of these 10 cities was 152,087.

== 1800 ==
Rankings based on population data from the second United States census.

Rank	City	State	Population	Notes
1	New York	New York	60,514	
2	Philadelphia	Pennsylvania	41,220	(Present-day Center City.)
3	Baltimore	Maryland	26,514	
4	Boston	Massachusetts	24,937	Listed as a town and still the capital of Massachusetts, would become a city in 1822.
5	Charleston	South Carolina	18,824	
6	Northern Liberties	Pennsylvania	10,718	A neighborhood of Philadelphia annexed in 1854.
7	Southwark	Pennsylvania	9,621	A neighborhood of Philadelphia annexed in 1854.
8	Salem	Massachusetts	9,457	Listed as a town. Today, Salem is a city.
9	Providence	Rhode Island	7,614	Listed as a town. Last appearance in the top 10.
10	Norfolk	Virginia	6,926	Only appearance in the top 10, and only appearance of a city in Virginia in the top 10. Listed as a borough. Now an independent city.

The total population of these 10 cities was 216,346.

== 1810 ==
Rankings based on population data from the third United States census.

Rank	City	State	Population	Notes
1	New York	New York	96,373	
2	Philadelphia	Pennsylvania	53,722	(Present-day Center City.)
3	Baltimore	Maryland	46,555	
4	Boston	Massachusetts	33,787	
5	Charleston	South Carolina	24,711	
6	Northern Liberties	Pennsylvania	19,874	A neighborhood of Philadelphia annexed in 1854.
7	New Orleans	Territory of Orleans	17,242	First entry in the top 10 list not located in one of the original Thirteen Colonies.
8	Southwark	Pennsylvania	13,707	A neighborhood of Philadelphia annexed in 1854.
9	Salem	Massachusetts	12,613	Listed as a town.
10	Albany	New York	10,762	First appearance in the top 10, and first city in Upstate New York to make the top 10.

The total population of these 10 cities was 329,346.

== 1820 ==
Rankings based on population data drawn the fourth United States census.

Rank	City	State	Population	Notes
1	New York	New York	123,706	First city in the US to surpass 100,000.
2	Philadelphia	Pennsylvania	63,802	(Present-day Center City.)
3	Baltimore	Maryland	62,738	
4	Boston	Massachusetts	43,298	
5	New Orleans	Louisiana	27,176	Booming trade post, bought through the Louisiana Purchase.
6	Charleston	South Carolina	24,780	
7	Northern Liberties	Pennsylvania	19,678	A neighborhood of Philadelphia annexed in 1854.
8	Southwark	Pennsylvania	14,713	A neighborhood of Philadelphia annexed in 1854.
9	Washington	District of Columbia	13,247	First appearance of the new capital in the top 10. Would disappear from the list by next census and not reappear on top 10 until 1950.
10	Salem	Massachusetts	12,731	Last appearance in the top 10. Listed as a town.

The total population of these 10 cities was 405,869. Last time Massachusetts has two cities in the top ten.

== 1830 ==
Rankings based on population data from the fifth United States census.

Rank	City	State	Population	Notes
1	New York	New York	202,300	First city in the US to surpass 200,000.
2	Baltimore	Maryland	80,800	Baltimore is the second city to rank number two.
3	Philadelphia	Pennsylvania	80,462	(Present-day Center City.)
4	Boston	Massachusetts	61,392	
5	New Orleans	Louisiana	46,082	
6	Charleston	South Carolina	30,289	
7	Northern Liberties	Pennsylvania	28,872	A neighborhood of Philadelphia annexed in 1854.
8	Cincinnati	Ohio	24,831	Listed as a town. First Midwestern city in top 10.
9	Albany	New York	24,209	
10	Southwark	Pennsylvania	20,581	A neighborhood of Philadelphia annexed in 1854. Last appearance in top 10.

The total population of these 10 cities was 599,927.

== 1840 ==
Rankings based on data drawn from the sixth United States census.

Rank	City	State	Population	Notes
1	New York	New York	312,710	First city in the US to surpass 300,000.
2	Baltimore	Maryland	102,313	Second city in the US, after New York, to surpass 100,000.
3	New Orleans	Louisiana	102,193	New Orleans' rapid growth shows the increasing importance of Mississippi River trade before the advent of the railroad.
4	Philadelphia	Pennsylvania	93,665	(Present-day Center City.)
5	Boston	Massachusetts	93,383	
6	Cincinnati	Ohio	46,338	Listed as a town.
7	Brooklyn	New York	36,233	At this time, Brooklyn was a city.
8	Northern Liberties	Pennsylvania	34,474	A neighborhood of Philadelphia annexed in 1854. Last appearance in top 10.
9	Albany	New York	33,721	
10	Charleston	South Carolina	29,261	Last appearance in top 10. First ever population drop for Charleston.

The total population of these 10 cities was 884,291.

== 1850 ==
By 1850, the United States was in the midst of the First Industrial Revolution. Rankings based on population data compiled in the seventh United States census.

Rank	City	State	Population	Notes
1	New York	New York	515,547	First city in the US to surpass 400,000 and 500,000.
2	Baltimore	Maryland	169,054	
3	Boston	Massachusetts	136,881	
4	Philadelphia	Pennsylvania	121,376	(Present-day Center City.)
5	New Orleans	Louisiana	116,375	
6	Cincinnati	Ohio	115,435	
7	Brooklyn	New York	96,838	
8	St. Louis	Missouri	77,860	First Top 10 appearance of any city west of the Mississippi River.
9	Spring Garden	Pennsylvania	58,894	Now a neighborhood of Philadelphia. Only appearance in the top 10. Last census where Spring Garden was an independent city.
10	Albany	New York	50,763	Last appearance in top 10.

The total population of these 10 cities was 1,459,023.

== 1860 ==
Rankings based on data drawn from the eighth United States census, the last national decennial census conducted before the outbreak of the American Civil War in 1861. This is the first census where the Northeast does not hold a supermajority of the top ten largest cities.

Rank	City	State	Population	Notes
1	New York	New York	813,669	First city in the US to surpass 600,000, 700,000, and 800,000.
2	Philadelphia	Pennsylvania	565,529	The large jump in population between the seventh and eighth censuses is due to the 1854 Act of Consolidation, which greatly expanded the City of Philadelphia to be coterminous with Philadelphia County, and abolished all other local governments in the county. The "Philadelphia" prior to 1854 is present-day Center City.
3	Brooklyn	New York	266,661	
4	Baltimore	Maryland	212,418	
5	Boston	Massachusetts	177,840	
6	New Orleans	Louisiana	168,675	
7	Cincinnati	Ohio	161,044	
8	St. Louis	Missouri	160,773	
9	Chicago	Illinois	112,172	First appearance in top 10. In the previous census, it was the 24th largest American city with a population of 29,963. At one point, Chicago would be the world's fastest growing city.
10	Buffalo	New York	81,129	First appearance in top 10. Would not re-appear until 1900.

The total population of these 10 cities was 2,719,910.

== 1870 ==
This was the ninth United States census. This is the first census where the Northeast does not hold a simple majority of the top ten largest cities (briefly returns to 6 in the 1910 census). This is also the first census in which every city in the top 10 has a population of over 100,000.

Rank	City	State	Population	Notes
1	New York	New York	942,292	First city in the US to surpass 900,000. Included present-day Manhattan only.
2	Philadelphia	Pennsylvania	674,022	
3	Brooklyn	New York	396,099	
4	St. Louis	Missouri	310,864	The 1870 St. Louis Census total may have been slightly boosted by fraud. (Note: Arenson, Adam (2011). The great heart of the republic: St. Louis and the cultural Civil War. Cambridge, Mass.: Harvard University Press. p. 191-192. ISBN 0674052889.)
5	Chicago	Illinois	298,977	Census was taken one year before the Great Chicago Fire, which burned down a large portion of the city.
6	Baltimore	Maryland	267,354	
7	Boston	Massachusetts	250,526	
8	Cincinnati	Ohio	216,239	
9	New Orleans	Louisiana	191,418	
10	San Francisco	California	149,473	First West Coast city in top 10. Its population boom began after 1848 with the Gold Rush and continued with silver discoveries such as the Comstock Lode in 1859. The first transcontinental railroad was completed in 1869.

The total population of these 10 cities was 3,697,264.

== 1880 ==
This was the tenth United States census.

Rank	City	State	Population	Notes
1	New York	New York	1,206,299	First city in the US to reach 1 million+ population milestone. Municipal boundaries encompassed present-day Manhattan and the West Bronx only.
2	Philadelphia	Pennsylvania	847,170	
3	Brooklyn	New York	566,663	
4	Chicago	Illinois	503,185	The Great Chicago Fire destroyed approximately one-third of the city in 1871, yet the city still experienced extreme growth by this census count.
5	Boston	Massachusetts	362,839	
6	St. Louis	Missouri	350,518	The city of St. Louis seceded from St. Louis County in 1876. The population of St. Louis City and St. Louis County during the Census was ~386,000.
7	Baltimore	Maryland	332,313	
8	Cincinnati	Ohio	255,139	
9	San Francisco	California	233,959	
10	New Orleans	Louisiana	216,090	Last appearance in top 10.

The total population of these 10 cities was 4,874,175.

== 1890 ==
The 1890 census was the eleventh. Four Midwest cities occupied the top ten spots, with two cities from Ohio in the top ten for the first time.

Rank	City	State	Population	Notes
1	New York	New York	1,515,301	This is the last census before New York was consolidated into its present-day Five Boroughs municipal arrangement (therefore the figure is that of New York County, which at the time consisted of Manhattan Island and the western part of what later would become The Bronx).
2	Chicago	Illinois	1,109,850	Third city in the US to reach 1 million. Chicago overtakes Philadelphia as the nation's second most populous city shortly after they both pass the 1 million mark.
3	Philadelphia	Pennsylvania	1,046,964	Second city in the US to reach 1 million.
4	Brooklyn	New York	806,343	This is the last census where the City of Brooklyn is counted as an independent city. Brooklyn would be politically absorbed into New York City in 1898 and have its population counted as a component of the latter city's figure from the Twelfth census onward.
5	St. Louis	Missouri	451,770	
6	Boston	Massachusetts	448,477	
7	Baltimore	Maryland	434,439	
8	San Francisco	California	298,997	
9	Cincinnati	Ohio	296,908	
10	Cleveland	Ohio	261,353	First appearance in top 10.

The total population of these 10 cities was 6,660,402.

== 1900 ==
The 1900 census was the twelfth.

Rank	City	State	Population	Notes
1	New York	New York	3,437,202	First city in the US to surpass 3 million residents. This is the first census after the consolidation of New York City and County with Brooklyn/Kings County, western Queens County, and Richmond County.
2	Chicago	Illinois	1,698,575	
3	Philadelphia	Pennsylvania	1,293,697	
4	St. Louis	Missouri	575,238	
5	Boston	Massachusetts	560,892	
6	Baltimore	Maryland	508,957	
7	Cleveland	Ohio	391,768	
8	Buffalo	New York	352,387	First appearance since 1860.
9	San Francisco	California	342,782	Last appearance in top 10. Last census before earthquake and fire.
10	Cincinnati	Ohio	325,902	Last appearance in the top 10.

The total population of these 10 cities was 9,487,400.

== 1910 ==
The 1910 census was the thirteenth.

Rank	City	State	Population	Notes
1	New York	New York	4,766,883	First and only city in the US to surpass 4 million residents. Manhattan reached its historical high of over 2.3 million while Brooklyn had 1,634,351. However, the other three less populated boroughs began to grow rapidly as a result of then-recent transportation improvements, including the expansion of the NYC subway system into the city's formerly rural hinterland and the opening of new East River and Harlem River crossings, which provided a demographic escape valve for Manhattan and Brooklyn's densely populated tenement districts.
2	Chicago	Illinois	2,185,283	Second city in the U.S. to reach 2 million.
3	Philadelphia	Pennsylvania	1,549,008	
4	St. Louis	Missouri	687,029	
5	Boston	Massachusetts	670,585	
6	Cleveland	Ohio	560,663	
7	Baltimore	Maryland	558,485	
8	Pittsburgh	Pennsylvania	533,905	First appearance in top 10.
9	Detroit	Michigan	465,766	First appearance in top 10.
10	Buffalo	New York	423,715	Last appearance in top 10.

The total population of these 10 cities was 12,401,322.

== 1920 ==
The 1920 census was the fourteenth. Only time three Midwestern cities occupy the top five.

Rank	City	State	Population	Notes
1	New York	New York	5,620,048	First and only city in the US to surpass 5 million residents. Brooklyn passes 2 million with 2,018,356 of this total.
2	Chicago	Illinois	2,701,705	
3	Philadelphia	Pennsylvania	1,823,779	
4	Detroit	Michigan	993,069	The rise of the automobile industry in the Detroit area propelled its growth substantially between 1910 and 1920, doubling its population in only 10 years.
5	Cleveland	Ohio	796,841	Only census where Cleveland makes the top 5.
6	St. Louis	Missouri	772,897	
7	Boston	Massachusetts	748,060	
8	Baltimore	Maryland	733,826	
9	Pittsburgh	Pennsylvania	588,343	
10	Los Angeles	California	576,673	First appearance in top 10.

The total population of these 10 cities was 15,355,250.

== 1930 ==
The 1930 census was the fifteenth.

Rank	City	State	Population	Notes
1	New York	New York	6,930,446	First and only city in the US to surpass 6 million residents. Brooklyn accounts for 2,560,401 of the total.
2	Chicago	Illinois	3,376,438	Second city in the U.S. to surpass 3 million.
3	Philadelphia	Pennsylvania	1,950,961	
4	Detroit	Michigan	1,568,662	Fourth city in the U.S. to surpass 1 million.
5	Los Angeles	California	1,238,048	Fifth city in the U.S. (and first in California) to surpass 1 million. First West Coast city to make the top 5.
6	Cleveland	Ohio	900,429	
7	St. Louis	Missouri	821,960	
8	Baltimore	Maryland	804,874	
9	Boston	Massachusetts	781,188	
10	Pittsburgh	Pennsylvania	669,817	

The total population of these 10 cities was 19,042,823.

== 1940 ==
Four of the ten cities here would have their first ever population drop in 1940. Though slight, they would presage a precipitous decline that started in 1950. The 1940 census was the sixteenth. This is also the first census in which the total population of the 10 largest cities combined increased by less than 10% from the last census, 10 years ago (<1% per year).

#	City	State	Population	Notes
1	New York	New York	7,454,995	First and only city in the US to surpass 7 million residents.
2	Chicago	Illinois	3,396,808	
3	Philadelphia	Pennsylvania	1,931,334	First ever population drop for Philadelphia.
4	Detroit	Michigan	1,623,452	
5	Los Angeles	California	1,504,277	
6	Cleveland	Ohio	878,336	First ever population drop for Cleveland.
7	Baltimore	Maryland	859,100	
8	St. Louis	Missouri	816,048	First ever population drop for St. Louis.
9	Boston	Massachusetts	770,816	First ever population drop for Boston.
10	Pittsburgh	Pennsylvania	671,659	Last appearance in top 10.

The total population of these 10 cities was 19,909,825.

== 1950 ==
1950 was a watershed year for many cities in the United States. Many cities in the country peaked in population, but started a slow decline caused by suburbanization associated with pollution, congestion, and increased crime rates in urban centers, while the improved infrastructure of the Eisenhower Interstate System more easily facilitated car commutes and white flight of the white middle class. The G.I. Bill made available low interest loans for returning World War II veterans seeking more commodious housing in the suburbs. Of the eighteen most populous cities in the 1950 census, fifteen have declined in population as of the 2020 census, with the exceptions of New York City, Los Angeles, and San Francisco. Although populations within city limits dropped in many American cities, the metropolitan populations of most cities continued to increase greatly. The 1950 census was the seventeenth.

Rank	City	State	Population	Notes
1	New York	New York	7,891,957	Brooklyn accounts for 2,738,175 of this total and Queens 1,550,849.
2	Chicago	Illinois	3,620,962	Population peaked this census.
3	Philadelphia	Pennsylvania	2,071,605	Population peaked this census. Third city in the U.S. to surpass 2 million.
4	Los Angeles	California	1,970,358	Los Angeles is one of the few cities to have nearly continuous growth since 1950.
5	Detroit	Michigan	1,849,568	Population peaked this census. To date, Detroit is the only city in the United States, other than San Jose, California, to have a population grow beyond 1 million and then fall below that figure.
6	Baltimore	Maryland	949,708	Population peaked this census.
7	Cleveland	Ohio	914,808	Population peaked this census.
8	St. Louis	Missouri	856,796	Population peaked this census.
9	Washington	District of Columbia	802,178	Population peaked this census. Re-appearance in the top 10 (last in 1820).
10	Boston	Massachusetts	801,444	Population peaked this census. Last appearance in top 10.

The total population of these 10 cities was 21,809,384.

== 1960 ==
The 1960 census was the eighteenth. This was the first census (see also 1980) to show a decline in the combined total population of top ten cities, with ▼826,495 (▼3.8%) fewer people than the 1950 Census' top ten cities.

Rank	City	State	Population	Notes
1	New York	New York	7,781,984	First ever population drop for New York City.
2	Chicago	Illinois	3,550,404	First ever population drop for Chicago.
3	Los Angeles	California	2,479,015	Los Angeles overtakes Philadelphia to become the nation's third-largest city. Fourth city in the U.S. (and first in California) to surpass 2 million.
4	Philadelphia	Pennsylvania	2,002,512	After 60 years as the nation's third-largest city, Philadelphia drops to the fourth spot on the list.
5	Detroit	Michigan	1,670,144	First ever population drop for Detroit.
6	Baltimore	Maryland	939,024	First ever population drop for Baltimore.
7	Houston	Texas	938,219	First appearance for a Texan city in the top 10.
8	Cleveland	Ohio	876,050	
9	Washington	District of Columbia	783,956	First ever population drop for Washington.
10	St. Louis	Missouri	750,026	Last appearance in the top 10.

The total population of these 10 cities was 20,982,889.

== 1970 ==
The 1970 census was the nineteenth.

Rank	City	State	Population	Notes
1	New York	New York	7,894,862	
2	Chicago	Illinois	3,366,957	
3	Los Angeles	California	2,816,061	
4	Philadelphia	Pennsylvania	1,948,609	
5	Detroit	Michigan	1,511,482	
6	Houston	Texas	1,232,802	Sixth city in the U.S. (and first in the South, or in Texas) to surpass 1 million.
7	Baltimore	Maryland	905,759	
8	Dallas	Texas	844,401	First appearance in the top 10.
9	Washington	District of Columbia	756,510	Last appearance in the top 10.
10	Cleveland	Ohio	750,903	Last appearance in the top 10. Cleveland is notably less dense in this census than in 1920.

The total population of these 10 cities was 22,028,346.

== 1980 ==
By 1980, the population trends of urban decline and suburbanization that started in the 1950s were at their peak. This was the second census (see also 1960) to show a decline in the combined total population of the top ten cities, with 1,142,003 (5.2%) fewer people than the 1970 Census' top ten cities, mostly due to the large drop in population of New York City. This is the first census in which half of the top ten cities are in the Sun Belt, specifically the West South Central and South Western area of the country. The 1980 census was the twentieth.

Rank	City	State	Population	Notes
1	New York	New York	7,071,639	New York City experienced the largest total population drop by a city up to this point in American history, recording 820,000 fewer people in 1980 than ten years before. The city government was crippled by severe financial strains and near bankruptcy as a result of its declining tax base during the 1970s, until being bailed out by the federal government later that decade.
2	Chicago	Illinois	3,005,072	
3	Los Angeles	California	2,966,850	
4	Philadelphia	Pennsylvania	1,688,210	
5	Houston	Texas	1,595,138	Houston becomes the first (and to date, the only) Texas city to reach the top 5.
6	Detroit	Michigan	1,203,339	
7	Dallas	Texas	904,078	
8	San Diego	California	875,538	First appearance in the top 10.
9	Phoenix	Arizona	789,704	First appearance in the top 10. First (and to date, the only) city in the Mountain West to reach the top 10.
10	Baltimore	Maryland	786,775	Last appearance in the top 10.

The total population of these 10 cities was 20,886,343.

== 1990 ==
The 1990 Census was the Twenty-first. Continued trends of western cities' growth and Northeastern cities' contraction now place a majority of the top ten cities in the western portion of the Sun Belt, a regional concentration not seen since Northeastern cities dominated the top of the first seven censuses.

Rank	City	State	Population	Notes
1	New York	New York	7,322,564	New York City gained population during the 1980s after heavy losses in the 1970s.
2	Los Angeles	California	3,485,398	Los Angeles becomes the nation's second largest city in 1982. Third U.S. city (and first on the American West Coast, or in California) to surpass 3 million.
3	Chicago	Illinois	2,783,726	After nearly 100 years as the nation's second largest city, Chicago is surpassed by Los Angeles in 1982 and becomes the third largest city.
4	Houston	Texas	1,630,553	Houston overtakes Philadelphia to become the nation's fourth largest city.
5	Philadelphia	Pennsylvania	1,585,577	
6	San Diego	California	1,110,549	Seventh city in the U.S. (and second in California) to surpass 1 million.
7	Detroit	Michigan	1,027,974	Last census to have a population of over 1 million.
8	Dallas	Texas	1,006,877	Eighth city in the U.S. (and second in the South, or in Texas) to surpass 1 million.
9	Phoenix	Arizona	992,551	
10	San Antonio	Texas	935,933	First appearance in top 10.

The total population of these 10 cities was 21,872,554.

== 2000 ==
The 2000 census was the 22nd in U.S. history.

Rank	City	State	Population	Notes
1	New York	New York	8,008,278	First and only city in the US to surpass 8 million residents.
2	Los Angeles	California	3,694,820	
3	Chicago	Illinois	2,896,016	Chicago experienced population gain during the 1990s.
4	Houston	Texas	1,953,631	
5	Philadelphia	Pennsylvania	1,517,550	
6	Phoenix	Arizona	1,321,045	Ninth city in the U.S. (and first and only in the Mountain West) to surpass 1 million, as well as the only Arizona city and only state capital to do so too.
7	San Diego	California	1,223,400	
8	Dallas	Texas	1,188,580	
9	San Antonio	Texas	1,144,646	10th city in the U.S. (and third in the South, or in Texas) to surpass 1 million.
10	Detroit	Michigan	951,270	First city ever to drop back under 1 million. Last appearance in top 10.

The total population of these 10 cities was 23,899,236.

== 2010 ==
Seven of the country's ten largest cities in 2010 were located in the Sun Belt region of the south and west, all of which have far lower population density than their earlier top-ranking counterparts. A different ranking is evident when considering U.S. metro area populations which count both city and suburban populations. The 2010 census was the twenty-third.

Rank	City	State	Population	Notes
1	New York	New York	8,175,133	
2	Los Angeles	California	3,792,621	
3	Chicago	Illinois	2,695,598	
4	Houston	Texas	2,099,451	Fifth city in the U.S. (and first in the South, or in Texas) to surpass 2 million.
5	Philadelphia	Pennsylvania	1,526,006	First population gain since 1950.
6	Phoenix	Arizona	1,445,632	Phoenix briefly experienced population decline during the recession but rebounded slowly.
7	San Antonio	Texas	1,327,407	San Antonio overtakes Dallas as Texas' second-largest city.
8	San Diego	California	1,307,402	
9	Dallas	Texas	1,197,816	
10	San Jose	California	945,942	First appearance in the top 10.

The total population of these 10 cities was 24,513,008.

== 2020 ==
2020 is the first census in which all ten of the largest cities have populations of over one million. It is also the first census since 1940 in which no cities entered or left the top ten, and the first census since 1950 in which all ten cities gained population. This was the twenty-fourth census.

Rank	City	State	Population	Notes
1	New York	New York	8,804,190	
2	Los Angeles	California	3,898,747	
3	Chicago	Illinois	2,746,388	
4	Houston	Texas	2,304,580	
5	Phoenix	Arizona	1,608,139	Phoenix overtakes Philadelphia as the nation's 5th largest city, and becomes the first city in the Mountain West to reach the top 5.
6	Philadelphia	Pennsylvania	1,603,797	For the first time, Philadelphia drops out of the top 5.
7	San Antonio	Texas	1,434,625	
8	San Diego	California	1,386,932	
9	Dallas	Texas	1,304,379	
10	San Jose	California	1,013,240	11th city in the U.S. (and third in California) to surpass 1 million.

The total population of these 10 cities was 26,105,017.

== Totals ==
Year	Total population	Change
1790	152,087	NA
1800	216,346	▲42.25%
1810	329,346	▲52.23%
1820	405,869	▲23.23%
1830	599,927	▲47.81%
1840	884,291	▲47.40%
1850	1,459,023	▲64.99%
1860	2,719,910	▲86.42%
1870	3,697,264	▲35.93%
1880	4,874,175	▲31.83%
1890	6,660,402	▲36.65%
1900	9,487,400	▲42.44%
1910	12,401,322	▲30.71%
1920	15,355,250	▲23.82%
1930	19,042,823	▲24.02%
1940	19,909,825	▲4.55%
1950	21,809,384	▲9.54%
1960	20,982,889	▼ -3.79%
1970	22,028,346	▲4.98%
1980	20,886,343	▼ -5.18%
1990	21,872,554	▲4.72%
2000	23,899,236	▲9.27%
2010	24,513,008	▲2.57%
2020	26,105,017	▲6.49%

== See also ==
- United States
  - Outline of the United States
  - Index of United States-related articles
  - United States Census Bureau
    - Demographics of the United States
      - Urbanization in the United States
      - List of U.S. states and territories by population
      - List of U.S. states and territories by historical population
      - List of U.S. cities by population
      - List of largest cities of U.S. states and territories by historical population
  - United States Office of Management and Budget
    - Statistical area (United States)
      - Combined statistical area (list)
      - Core-based statistical area (list)
        - Metropolitan statistical area (list)
        - Micropolitan statistical area (list)
