= List of largest cities in the Midwestern United States by population =

A map of the Midwestern United States as defined by the United States Census Bureau.

This is a list of the largest cities in the Midwestern United States (Illinois, Indiana, Iowa, Kansas, Michigan, Minnesota, Missouri Nebraska, North Dakota, Ohio, South Dakota, and Wisconsin) over 100,000 people, based on estimates for July 1, 2024, by the United States Census Bureau.

The Midwest Region has a collective population of 68,995,685 in 12 states, based on the 2020 United States census. Sizeable cities in this region include Chicago, Indianapolis, Detroit, Louisville, and Minneapolis, among others. The population figures here are for the incorporated areas of the listed cities, as opposed to metropolitan areas, urban areas, or counties.

== List ==
State capital
State's largest city
State capital and largest city

2024 rank	City	State	Population (2024 est.)	County	Image	Notes
1	Chicago	IL	2,721,308	Cook County, Illinois		Largest city in Illinois; Largest city in the Midwest
2	Columbus	OH	933,263	Franklin County, Ohio		Largest city and capital of Ohio
3	Indianapolis	IN	891,484	Marion County, Indiana		Largest city and capital of Indiana
4	Detroit	MI	645,705	Wayne County, Michigan		Largest city in Michigan
5	Louisville	KY	640,796	Jefferson County, Kentucky		Largest city in Kentucky
6	Milwaukee	WI	563,531	Milwaukee County, Wisconsin		Largest city in Wisconsin
7	Kansas City	MO	516,032	Jackson County, Missouri		Largest city in Missouri
8	Omaha	NE	489,265	Douglas County, Nebraska		Largest city in Nebraska
9	Minneapolis	MN	428,579	Hennepin County, Minnesota		Largest city in Minnesota
10	Wichita	KS	400,991	Sedgwick County, Kansas		Largest city in Kansas
11	Cleveland	OH	365,379	Cuyahoga County, Ohio		
12	Lexington	KY	329,437	Fayette County, Kentucky		
13	Cincinnati	OH	314,915	Hamilton County, Ohio		
14	Saint Paul	MN	307,465	Ramsey County, Minnesota		Capital of Minnesota
15	Lincoln	NE	300,619	Lancaster County, Nebraska		Capital of Nebraska
16	Madison	WI	285,300	Dane County, Wisconsin		Capital of Wisconsin
17	St. Louis	MO	279,695	Independent City		
18	Fort Wayne	IN	273,203	Allen County, Indiana		
19	Toledo	OH	265,638	Lucas County, Ohio		
20	Des Moines	IA	213,096	Polk County, Iowa		Largest city and capital of Iowa
21	Sioux Falls	SD	209,289	Lincoln County, South Dakota		Largest city in South Dakota
22	Overland Park	KS	202,893	Johnson County, Kansas		
23	Grand Rapids	MI	200,117	Kent County, Michigan		
24	Akron	OH	189,664	Summit County, Ohio		
25	Aurora	IL	180,710	Kane County, Illinois		
26	Springfield	MO	170,596	Greene County, Missouri		
27	Kansas City	KS	156,752	Wyandotte County, Kansas		
28	Naperville	IL	153,124	DuPage County, Illinois		
29	Joliet	IL	151,837	Will County, Illinois		
30	Olathe	KS	149,035	Johnson County, Kansas		
31	Rockford	IL	147,486	Winnebago County, Illinois		
32	Cedar Rapids	IA	137,904	Linn County, Iowa		
33	Warren	MI	137,686	Macomb County, Michigan		
34	Dayton	OH	136,346	Montgomery County, Ohio		
35	Fargo	ND	136,285	Cass County, North Dakota		Largest city in North Dakota
36	Sterling Heights	MI	134,342	Macomb County, Michigan		
37	Columbia	MO	130,900	Boone County, Missouri		
38	Topeka	KS	125,467	Shawnee County, Kansas		Capital of Kansas
39	Rochester	MN	123,624	Olmsted County, Minnesota		
40	Ann Arbor	MI	122,925	Washtenaw County, Michigan		
41	Independence	MO	121,629	Jackson County, Missouri		
42	Evansville	IN	115,395	Vanderburgh County, Indiana		
43	Elgin	IL	114,701	Kane County, Illinois		
44	Lansing	MI	114,336	Ingham County, Michigan		Capital of Michigan
45	Springfield	IL	112,949	Sangamon County, Illinois		Capital of Illinois
46	Peoria	IL	111,696	Peoria County, Illinois		
47	Lee's Summit	MO	106,419	Jackson County, Missouri		
48	Dearborn	MI	106,377	Wayne County, Michigan		
49	Green Bay	WI	106,311	Brown County, Wisconsin		
50	Fishers	IN	103,986	Hamilton County, Indiana		
51	South Bend	IN	103,713	St. Joseph County, Indiana		
52	Carmel	IN	103,606	Hamilton County, Indiana		
53	Clinton	MI	101,359	Macomb County, Michigan (Charter Township)		
54	Davenport	IA	100,938	Scott County, Iowa		

== Cities formerly over 100,000 people ==
The following cities are places that have reached 100,000 people in past censuses but have since decreased below 100,000, mostly due to Rust Belt decline. The 2024 population estimates of these cities are also listed.

- Livonia, MI (93,113)
- Duluth, MN (87,986)
- Flint, MN (79,735)
- Parma, OH (79,350)
- Hammond, IN (76,030)
- St. Joseph, MO (71,098)
- Canton, OH (69,211)
- Gary, IN (67,555)
- Youngstown, OH (59,123)

== Map ==
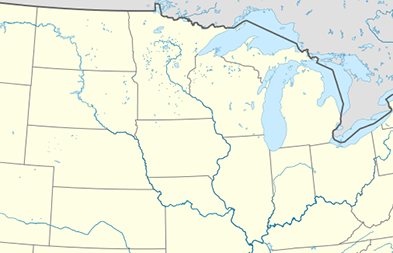
Top 20 most populous cities in the Midwestern United States.
