= Arco Iris, Panama =

District of the city of Colón in the Republic of Panama

Rainbow City, now known as the sector Arco Iris, in the corregimiento Cristóbal, is a section of the city of Colón in the Republic of Panama. It was originally built as segregated housing for Panama Canal employees and was developed into a proper town by the Canal Zone Government. During over a century of history, Rainbow City was home to some of Panama Canal's teachers, workers, and athletes.

== Early history ==
During the French canal construction era, in the 1880s, the area occupied by Rainbow City today showed up in maps as a little settlement called Guava Ridge.

By the time the United States acquired the rights to build the Canal in 1904, the area included a settlement at Folks River (called "Fox" River up to 1915), which consisted of "small, portable houses put up by the French and in bad condition," and "24 main buildings in three rows," between the railroad shops and the main line. There was also a settlement on the shores of Limón Bay, overlooking Telfer's Island. This area, which came to be known as Camp Bierd, included a few houses for families but mostly consisted of crowded one-story barracks for dock workers.

== Canal construction era ==
In 1907, there were 2,439 men, women and children in the Cristobal District's "silver" quarters. The segregated school, with an enrolment of 166, was the largest colored school in the Canal Zone.

Cristobal's constant activity, particularly in port and railroad traffic, provided employment to most of Silver City's men and guaranteed that the population of the segregated town continued to experience growth even as white settlements in the Canal Zone experienced sharp population drops as Canal construction drew to a close.

In 1915, soon after the Canal was inaugurated, a survey of housing needs throughout the Canal Zone was conducted, and urgent need for more quarters was clearly identified for Atlantic Side towns. At the time, the population of Fox River was 932 and Camp Bierd was 1,818. The survey found that 500 apartments were needed for married employees in Fox River and Camp Bierd and that the barracks in Camp Bierd were filled beyond their capacity. To meet the immediate silver quarters needs, the Canal acquired a huge structure of 140 rooms, known as the "Long Building" or Noah's Ark.

The first permanent town for "silver" workers was built in a landfill to the south and east of the Ark. The fill consisted of hard-packed dirt excavated from the U.S. Army's construction of Fort Davis, north of the town of Gatun. This first town, built between 1919 and 1921, initially consisted of thirty-nine 12-family houses and ten 32-room bachelor barracks. For some time, this new town and its streets remained unnamed, but was referred to in Canal Zone files as Silver Town, Cristobal Silver Townsite, and "The Folks River End of Manzanillo Island." Eventually, its residents took matters into their own hands and named it Silver City.

== Silver City, CZ ==
The first reference to Silver City with a capital C appears in July 1921, when it was used on official correspondence. Silver City's streets were initially numbered and lettered, but its residents eventually also named the streets on their own initiative, so it was only a matter of time before names like Alligator Street (now St. Kitts), Wall Street (now Jamaica Street) emerged. A 1955 article in the Panama Canal Review, reported that Wall Street was purportedly where more affluent Silver Citonians lived.

Silver City continued to grow and in 1933 it acquired its first suburb—Silver City Heights. Though the difference in elevation is hardly perceptible, the new settlement's name was also of local coinage. Most of the buildings in Silver City Heights were two-story 12-family quarters, designed primarily to accommodate the families still living in Camp Bierd. The remaining barracks were later used during the increased port activity related to the Third Locks Project and the Second World War, but after the war, many of Camp Bierd's buildings were demolished, with sparse housing remaining in old Navy barracks which came to be known by locals as the "Vatican City".

On the night of April 15, 1940, flames swept through the heart of Colón, driving hundreds of families from their homes. Many of these families were Canal employees. Within a few days, 100 tents went up in a row just south of Silver City Heights to shelter Colón's refugees. A few months later, 36 cantonment-type quarters were built to provide more permanent shelter. At first, each house had 12 apartments. In the early 1950s, these quarters were remodeled to house only four or six families each and to extend their useful life.

The area of Camp Coiner was adjacent to Silver City, just across Randolph Road. It was originally known as Camp Randolph, but acquired its name in 1942 when it was occupied by the main offices of the Construction District of the Panama Engineer Division. The name was in honor of Lt. Col. Richard T. Coiner, Corps of Engineers, who died in August 1933 while serving as Department Engineer in the Canal Zone. In 1945, at the end of the Second World War, the U.S. Army transferred Camp Coiner to the Canal Zone and the area became Silver City's second suburb. The Army buildings were replaced with more suitable buildings, including the first "experimental housing" for local rate workers.

The early 1950s brought about improvements which made of Silver City a more complete, better served town. In March 1951, a new swimming pool, bathhouse and luncheonette were built in a playground area east of the town's vocational school. The pool was 60 by 100 feet, built of reinforced concrete and lined with ceramic tiles. The luncheonette included a soda fountain, kitchen, merchandise and pastry cases and about ten tables, with a partial view of the pool.

In 1951, construction of an extension to Silver City was begun to increase housing for the town and to relocate the last remaining families residing in Camp Bierd. The large scale extension of 139 duplex-type houses was built in two phases. The houses were set at angles to take advantage of prevailing breezes and were painted different colors to make them more appealing given their identical designs. This coloring led locals to name the new area "Rainbow City."

== Rainbow City, CZ ==
In April 1952, Gov. F. K. Newcomer authorized the Panama Canal Review to conduct a poll of the residents of Silver City, including the area of Camp Coiner, to determine the name of their town. This was the only time in the history of the Canal Zone that residents of a community were given an opportunity to vote their preference for the name of their town. The poll was conducted as a house-to-house canvass by the Panama Canal Review in collaboration with the International Boy Scouts. Ballots were distributed to each of the approximately 1,280 households in town.

Silver City's residents were given six proposed names to vote on: Silver City, Rainbow City, Folks City, Manzanillo, Granada and Mindi. The majority voted for Rainbow City, the name given to the newest area of town for its colorfully painted houses. On May 1, 1952, the change of name to Rainbow City was made effective by Newcomer.

In February 1954, a new two-wing addition to Rainbow City Elementary School was inaugurated, relieving previous overcrowding. This addition was based on the same design as the new elementary school for the US-rate town of Margarita, which had also faced increased demand.

Rainbow City was the Canal Zone's largest civilian townsite. In the November 1954 census, Rainbow City's population was counted at 4,845, of which 55% were children. There were more children in Rainbow City than the combined total populations of the white townsites of Margarita and New Cristobal.

== Rainbow City / Arco Iris, RP ==
Rainbow City was one of the first Canal Zone areas to revert to the Republic of Panama in accordance with the 1977 Panama Canal Treaties. Even before the 1979 reversion, many of Rainbow City's residents began migrating to the United States, particularly to New York City. Many others also moved to Panama City as economic conditions in Colón worsened considerably and job opportunities with the Panama Canal grew more limited.

After the 1979 reversion, the township's name was changed to Arco Iris, the Spanish translation of "Rainbow", and a name which the area retains to this day.
