= List of U.S. states and territories by population =

Resident population of each U.S. state, the District of Columbia, and Puerto Rico in 2024 according to the U.S. Census Bureau

The states and territories included in the United States Census Bureau's statistics for the United States population, ethnicity, and most other categories include the 50 states and Washington, D.C. Separate statistics are maintained for the five permanently inhabited territories of the United States: Puerto Rico, Guam, the U.S. Virgin Islands, American Samoa, and the Northern Mariana Islands.

As of April 1, 2020, the date of the 2020 United States census, the nine most populous U.S. states contain slightly more than half of the total population. The 25 least populous states contain less than one-sixth of the total population. California, the most populous state, contains more people than the 21 least populous states combined, and Wyoming, the least populous state, has a population less than any of the 31 most populous U.S. cities. The population of Wyoming currently as of 2025 is 588,753.

== Method ==
The United States Census counts the persons residing in the United States including citizens, non-citizen permanent residents, and non-citizen long-term visitors. Civilian and military federal employees serving abroad and their dependents are counted in their home state.

== Electoral apportionment ==
Every 10 years, the U.S. Census Bureau is charged with making an actual count of all residents by state and territory. The accuracy of this count is then tested after the fact, and sometimes statistically significant undercounts or overcounts occur. For example, for the 2020 decennial census, 14 states had significant miscounts ranging from 1.5% to 6.6%. While these adjustments may be reflected in government programs over the following decade, the 10-year representative apportionments discussed below are not changed to reflect the miscount.

=== House of Representatives ===
Based on this decennial census, each state is allocated a portion of the 435 fixed seats in the United States House of Representatives (until the early 20th century, the apportionment process generally increased the size of the House based on the results of the census until the size of the House was capped by the Reapportionment Act of 1929), with each state guaranteed at least one Representative. The allocation is based on each state's proportion of the combined population of the fifty states (not including the District of Columbia, Guam, American Samoa, the Northern Mariana Islands, Puerto Rico, or the U.S. Virgin Islands).

=== Electoral College ===
The Electoral College, every four years, elects the President and Vice President of the United States based on the popular vote in each state and the District of Columbia. Each state's number of votes in the Electoral College is equal to its number of members in the Senate plus members in the House of Representatives.

The Twenty-third Amendment to the United States Constitution additionally grants the District of Columbia (D.C.), which is not a state, as many Electoral College votes as it would have if it were a state, while having no more votes than the least populous state (Wyoming). Since the U.S. Constitution guarantees every state at least one member of the U.S. House of Representatives and two members of the U.S. Senate, every state has at least three Electoral College votes. Thus, the Electoral College has 538 members (100 senators, plus 435 representatives due to the limit imposed by the Reapportionment Act of 1929, plus 3 members for the District of Columbia). Territories of the United States are not included in the Electoral College: people in those territories cannot vote directly for the President of the United States, although they may participate in the partisan nominating primaries and caucuses.

== State and territory rankings ==
U.S. states and territories by population
	State or territory	Census population (Note: Resident population only; does not include overseas population. In 2022, the Census Bureau announced the following undercounts (missed residents) in the 2020 census: Arkansas (−5.04%), Florida (−3.48%), Illinois (−1.97%), Mississippi (−4.11%), Tennessee (−4.78%) and Texas (−1.92%). These were the overcounts: Delaware (+5.45%), Hawaii (+6.79%), Massachusetts (+2.24%), Minnesota (+3.84%), New York (+3.44%), Ohio (+1.49%), Rhode Island (+5.05%) and Utah (+2.59%).)		House seats (Note: Effective from 2022 onward.)		Pop. per elec. vote (2020) (Note: Effective from the 2022 elections onward. Each state has a number of votes in the Electoral College equal to its number of senators (two) and representatives in the Congress, while D.C. is granted three electoral votes. The Electoral College is used to elect the President and Vice President of the United States.)	Pop. per seat (2020)	% US (2020)	% EC (2020)
	State or territory	July 1, 2025 (est.)	April 1, 2020	Seats	%	Pop. per elec. vote (2020)	Pop. per seat (2020)	% US (2020)	% EC (2020)
1	California	39,355,309	39,538,223	52	11.95%	732,189	760,350	11.800%	10.04%
2	Texas	31,709,821	29,145,505	38	8.74%	728,638	766,987	8.698%	7.43%
3	Florida	23,462,518	21,538,187	28	6.44%	717,940	769,221	6.428%	5.58%
4	New York	20,002,427	20,201,249	26	5.98%	721,473	776,971	6.029%	5.20%
5	Pennsylvania	13,059,432	13,002,700	17	3.91%	684,353	764,865	3.881%	3.53%
6	Illinois	12,719,141	12,812,508	17	3.91%	674,343	753,677	3.824%	3.53%
7	Ohio	11,900,510	11,799,448	15	3.45%	694,085	786,630	3.521%	3.16%
8	Georgia	11,302,748	10,711,908	14	3.22%	669,494	765,136	3.197%	2.97%
9	North Carolina	11,197,968	10,439,388	14	3.22%	652,462	745,671	3.116%	2.97%
10	Michigan	10,127,884	10,077,331	13	2.99%	671,822	775,179	3.008%	2.79%
11	New Jersey	9,548,215	9,288,994	12	2.76%	663,500	774,083	2.772%	2.60%
12	Virginia	8,880,107	8,631,393	11	2.53%	663,953	784,672	2.576%	2.42%
13	Washington	8,001,020	7,705,281	10	2.30%	642,107	770,528	2.300%	2.23%
14	Arizona	7,623,818	7,151,502	9	2.07%	650,137	794,611	2.134%	2.04%
15	Tennessee	7,315,076	6,910,840	9	2.07%	628,258	767,871	2.062%	2.04%
16	Massachusetts	7,154,084	7,029,917	9	2.07%	639,083	781,102	2.098%	2.04%
17	Indiana	6,973,333	6,785,528	9	2.07%	616,866	753,948	2.025%	2.04%
18	Missouri	6,270,541	6,154,913	8	1.84%	615,491	769,364	1.837%	1.86%
19	Maryland	6,265,347	6,177,224	8	1.84%	617,722	772,153	1.844%	1.86%
20	Colorado	6,012,561	5,773,714	8	1.84%	577,371	721,714	1.723%	1.86%
21	Wisconsin	5,972,787	5,893,718	8	1.84%	589,372	736,715	1.759%	1.86%
22	Minnesota	5,830,405	5,706,494	8	1.84%	570,649	713,312	1.703%	1.86%
23	South Carolina	5,570,274	5,118,425	7	1.61%	568,714	731,204	1.528%	1.67%
24	Alabama	5,193,088	5,024,279	7	1.61%	558,253	717,754	1.499%	1.67%
25	Louisiana	4,618,789	4,657,757	6	1.38%	582,220	776,293	1.390%	1.49%
26	Kentucky	4,606,864	4,505,836	6	1.38%	563,230	750,973	1.345%	1.49%
27	Oregon	4,273,586	4,237,256	6	1.38%	529,657	706,209	1.265%	1.49%
28	Oklahoma	4,123,288	3,959,353	5	1.15%	565,622	791,871	1.182%	1.30%
29	Connecticut	3,688,496	3,605,944	5	1.15%	515,135	721,189	1.076%	1.30%
30	Utah	3,538,904	3,271,616	4	0.92%	545,269	817,904	0.976%	1.12%
31	Nevada	3,282,188	3,104,614	4	0.92%	517,436	776,154	0.927%	1.12%
32	Iowa	3,238,387	3,190,369	4	0.92%	531,728	797,592	0.952%	1.12%
–	Puerto Rico	3,184,835	3,285,874	1* (Note: All territories plus D.C. have one House representative called a Resident commissioner (Puerto Rico) or a Delegate (D.C. and other territories), which can debate and vote in committees, but are restricted from voting on the House floor. Unlike other territories, D.C. is allowed to vote in presidential elections under the 23rd Amendment.)	—	—	—	0.981%	—
33	Arkansas	3,114,791	3,011,524	4	0.92%	501,921	752,881	0.899%	1.12%
34	Kansas	2,977,220	2,937,880	4	0.92%	489,647	734,470	0.877%	1.12%
35	Mississippi	2,954,160	2,961,279	4	0.92%	493,547	740,320	0.884%	1.12%
36	New Mexico	2,125,498	2,117,522	3	0.69%	423,504	705,841	0.632%	0.93%
37	Idaho	2,029,733	1,839,106	2	0.46%	459,777	919,553	0.549%	0.74%
38	Nebraska	2,018,006	1,961,504	3	0.69%	392,301	653,835	0.585%	0.93%
39	West Virginia	1,766,147	1,793,716	2	0.46%	448,429	896,858	0.535%	0.74%
40	Hawaii	1,432,820	1,455,271	2	0.46%	363,818	727,636	0.434%	0.74%
41	New Hampshire	1,415,342	1,377,529	2	0.46%	344,382	688,765	0.411%	0.74%
42	Maine	1,414,874	1,362,359	2	0.46%	340,590	681,180	0.407%	0.74%
43	Montana	1,144,694	1,084,225	2	0.46%	271,056	542,113	0.324%	0.74%
44	Rhode Island	1,114,521	1,097,379	2	0.46%	274,345	548,690	0.328%	0.74%
45	Delaware	1,059,952	989,948	1	0.23%	329,983	989,948	0.295%	0.56%
46	South Dakota	935,094	886,667	1	0.23%	295,556	886,667	0.265%	0.56%
47	North Dakota	799,358	779,094	1	0.23%	259,698	779,094	0.233%	0.56%
48	Alaska	737,270	733,391	1	0.23%	244,464	733,391	0.219%	0.56%
–	District of Columbia	693,645	689,545	1*	—	229,848	—	0.206%	0.56%
49	Vermont	644,663	643,077	1	0.23%	214,359	643,077	0.192%	0.56%
50	Wyoming	588,753	576,851	1	0.23%	192,284	576,851	0.172%	0.56%
–	Guam	N/A	153,836	1*	—	—	—	0.046%	—
–	U.S. Virgin Islands	N/A	87,146	1*	—	—	—	0.026%	—
–	American Samoa	N/A	49,710	1*	—	—	—	0.015%	—
–	Northern Mariana Islands	N/A	47,329	1*	—	—	—	0.014%	—
	Contiguous United States	339,614,767	329,260,619	432 (+1*)	99.31%	623,600	756,921	98.265%	98.70%
	The 50 states	341,091,212	330,759,736	435	100%	618,242	760,367	98.713%	99.44%
	The 50 states and D.C.	341,784,857	331,449,281	435 (+1*)	100%	616,077	—	98.918%	100%
	Total US and territories	N/A	335,073,176	435 (+6*)	100%	—	—	100%	—

* — non-voting member of the House of Representatives.

== Summary of population by region ==
Legend
Division totals – 9 divisions for 50 states and District of Columbia
Region totals – 4 regions (2 or 3 divisions each)
Individual territories
Total U.S. territories
50 states + District of Columbia
Divisions & regions as defined by U.S. Census Bureau
Last col. shows larger region which contains entity in col. 1

Column header abbreviations: # = Rank, Geo. = Geographic

Population of states, territories, divisions and region
State/federal district/territory/ division/region	#	2020 pop.	#	2010 pop.	#	2000 pop.	#	2010– 2020 change	Geo. sort
Massachusetts	15	7,029,917	14	6,547,629	13	6,349,097	21	7.4%	NEng
Connecticut	29	3,605,944	29	3,574,097	29	3,405,565	47	0.9%	NEng
New Hampshire	41	1,377,529	42	1,316,470	41	1,235,786	30	4.6%	NEng
Maine	42	1,362,359	41	1,328,361	40	1,274,923	42	2.6%	NEng
Rhode Island	43	1,097,379	43	1,052,567	43	1,048,319	31	4.3%	NEng
Vermont	49	643,077	49	625,741	49	608,827	40	2.8%	NEng
New England	9	15,116,205	9	14,444,865	9	13,922,517	7	4.6%	NEast
New York	4	20,201,249	3	19,378,102	3	18,976,457	32	4.2%	MAtl
Pennsylvania	5	13,002,700	6	12,702,379	6	12,281,054	43	2.4%	MAtl
New Jersey	11	9,288,994	11	8,791,894	9	8,414,350	25	5.7%	MAtl
Mid-Atlantic	4	42,492,943	4	40,872,375	4	39,671,861	8	4.0%	NEast
Northeast	4	57,609,148	4	55,317,240	4	53,594,378	3	4.1%	USA
Florida	3	21,538,187	4	18,801,310	4	15,982,378	8	14.6%	SAtl
Georgia	8	10,711,908	9	9,687,653	10	8,186,453	12	10.6%	SAtl
North Carolina	9	10,439,388	10	9,535,483	11	8,049,313	15	9.5%	SAtl
Virginia	12	8,631,393	12	8,001,024	12	7,078,515	18	7.9%	SAtl
Maryland	18	6,177,224	19	5,773,552	19	5,296,486	22	7.0%	SAtl
South Carolina	23	5,118,425	24	4,625,364	26	4,012,012	10	10.7%	SAtl
West Virginia	39	1,793,716	37	1,852,994	37	1,808,344	50	−3.2%	SAtl
Delaware	45	989,948	45	897,934	45	783,600	13	10.2%	SAtl
District of Columbia	–	689,545	–	601,723	–	572,059	–	14.6%	SAtl
South Atlantic	1	66,089,734	1	59,777,037	1	51,769,160	3	10.6%	South
Tennessee	16	6,910,840	17	6,346,105	16	5,689,283	17	8.9%	ESC
Alabama	24	5,024,279	23	4,779,736	23	4,447,100	27	5.1%	ESC
Kentucky	26	4,505,836	26	4,339,367	25	4,041,769	33	3.8%	ESC
Mississippi	34	2,961,279	31	2,967,297	31	2,844,658	49	−0.2%	ESC
East South Central	8	19,402,234	8	18,432,505	8	17,022,810	6	5.3%	South
Texas	2	29,145,505	2	25,145,561	2	20,851,820	3	15.9%	WSC
Louisiana	25	4,657,757	25	4,533,372	22	4,468,976	41	2.7%	WSC
Oklahoma	28	3,959,353	28	3,751,351	27	3,450,654	26	5.5%	WSC
Arkansas	33	3,011,524	32	2,915,918	33	2,673,400	35	3.3%	WSC
West South Central	5	40,774,139	5	36,346,202	5	31,444,850	2	12.2%	South
South	1	126,266,107	1	114,555,744	1	100,236,820	1	10.2%	USA
Illinois	6	12,812,508	5	12,830,632	5	12,419,293	48	−0.1%	ENC
Ohio	7	11,799,448	7	11,536,504	7	11,353,140	45	2.3%	ENC
Michigan	10	10,077,331	8	9,883,640	8	9,938,444	46	2.0%	ENC
Indiana	17	6,785,528	15	6,483,802	14	6,080,485	29	4.7%	ENC
Wisconsin	20	5,893,718	20	5,686,986	18	5,363,675	34	3.6%	ENC
East North Central	3	47,368,533	3	46,421,564	2	45,155,037	9	2.0%	MWest
Missouri	19	6,154,913	18	5,988,927	17	5,595,211	39	2.8%	WNC
Minnesota	22	5,706,494	21	5,303,925	21	4,919,479	19	7.6%	WNC
Iowa	31	3,190,369	30	3,046,355	30	2,926,324	28	4.7%	WNC
Kansas	35	2,937,880	33	2,853,118	32	2,688,418	37	3.0%	WNC
Nebraska	37	1,961,504	38	1,826,341	38	1,711,263	20	7.4%	WNC
South Dakota	46	886,667	46	814,180	46	754,844	16	8.9%	WNC
North Dakota	47	779,094	48	672,591	47	642,200	4	15.8%	WNC
West North Central	7	21,616,921	7	20,505,437	6	19,237,739	5	5.4%	MWest
Midwest	3	68,985,454	3	66,927,001	2	64,392,776	4	3.1%	USA
Arizona	14	7,151,502	16	6,392,017	20	5,130,632	9	11.9%	Mtn
Colorado	21	5,773,714	22	5,029,196	24	4,301,261	6	14.8%	Mtn
Utah	30	3,271,616	34	2,763,885	34	2,233,169	1	18.4%	Mtn
Nevada	32	3,104,614	35	2,700,551	35	1,998,257	5	15.0%	Mtn
New Mexico	36	2,117,522	36	2,059,179	36	1,819,046	38	2.8%	Mtn
Idaho	38	1,839,106	39	1,567,582	39	1,293,953	2	17.3%	Mtn
Montana	44	1,084,225	44	989,415	44	902,195	14	9.6%	Mtn
Wyoming	50	576,851	50	563,626	50	493,782	44	2.3%	Mtn
Mountain	6	24,919,150	6	22,065,451	7	18,172,295	1	12.9%	West
California	1	39,538,223	1	37,253,956	1	33,871,648	24	6.1%	Pac
Washington	13	7,705,281	13	6,724,540	15	5,894,121	7	14.6%	Pac
Oregon	27	4,237,256	27	3,831,074	28	3,421,399	11	10.6%	Pac
Hawaii	40	1,455,271	40	1,360,301	42	1,211,537	23	7.0%	Pac
Alaska	48	733,391	47	710,231	48	626,932	36	3.3%	Pac
Pacific	2	53,669,422	2	49,880,102	3	45,025,637	4	7.6%	West
West	2	78,588,572	2	71,945,553	3	63,197,932	2	9.2%	USA
50 states and District of Columbia	–	331,449,281	–	308,745,538	–	281,421,906	–	7.4%	NAmer
Puerto Rico	1	3,285,874	1	3,725,789	1	3,808,610	3	−11.8%	I.A.
Guam	2	153,836	2	159,358	2	154,805	1	−3.5%	I.A.
U.S. Virgin Islands	3	87,146	3	106,405	3	108,612	2	−18.1%	I.A.
American Samoa	4	49,710	4	55,519	5	57,291	4	−7.7%	I.A.
Northern Mariana Islands	5	47,329	5	53,883	4	69,221	5	−14.8%	I.A.
(United States Minor Outlying Islands) U.S. Minor Outlying Islands	6	(Note: Not enumerated in 2020.)	6	(Note: Not enumerated in 2010.)	6	316	6	—	I.A.
Island Areas (Territories)	–	3,623,895	–	4,100,954	–	4,198,855	–	−11.6%	USA
State/federal district/territory/ division/region	#	2020 pop.	#	2010 pop.	#	2000 pop.	#	2010– 2020 change	Geo. sort

== See also ==
- Demographics of the United States
- List of U.S. states and territories by area
- List of U.S. states and territories by net migration
- List of U.S. states and territories by race/ethnicity
- List of U.S. states and territories by African-American population
- List of U.S. states and territories by historical population (tables of state populations since 1790)
- List of states and territories of the United States by population density
- List of U.S. states and territories by religiosity
- List of U.S. states by vehicles per capita
- List of United States cities by population
