= List of U.S. states and territories by population density =

Map of states shaded by population density (2020)

This is a list of the 50 states, the 5 territories, and the District of Columbia of the United States of America by population density, population size, and land area. It also includes a sortable table of density by states, territories, divisions, and regions by population rank and land area, and a sortable table for density by states, divisions, regions, and territories in square miles and square kilometers.

The population density of the United States is lower than that of many other countries because of the United States' large land area. Large swathes of land are sparsely populated in parts of the US, such as the east-to-west stretch extending from Minneapolis to the outskirts of Seattle, or the north-to-south expanse from northern Montana to southern New Mexico, excluding Denver and Albuquerque. For comparison, the population density of the U.S. is 1/15 that of South Korea and the Netherlands and 1/12 that of India. On the other hand, it is over 8 times higher than that of Canada and over 9.5 times higher than that of Australia.

== States and territories by population density ==
Population density is defined as the population divided by land area. Data are from the US Census unless otherwise specified. Population data are for the year 2023 and area data are for the year 2010. Some population estimates for territories are from the United Nations Commission on Population and Development.

States and territories by density, population and area
Location	Density		Population	Land area	
Location	/mi^{2}	/km^{2}	Population	mi^{2}	km^{2}
District of Columbia	11,131	4,297	678,972	61	158
New Jersey	1,263	488	9,290,842	7,354	19,047
Rhode Island	1,060	409	1,095,962	1,034	2,678
Puerto Rico	936	361	3,205,691	3,424	8,868
Massachusetts	898	347	7,001,399	7,800	20,202
Guam	824	319	172,952	210	543
Connecticut	747	288	3,617,176	4,842	12,542
U.S. Virgin Islands	737	284	98,750	134	348
Maryland	637	246	6,180,253	9,707	25,142
American Samoa	578	222	43,915	76	198
Delaware	529	204	1,031,890	1,949	5,047
Florida	422	163	22,610,726	53,625	138,887
New York	415	160	19,571,216	47,126	122,057
Pennsylvania	290	112	12,961,683	44,743	115,883
Ohio	288	111	11,785,935	40,861	105,829
Northern Mariana Islands	274	106	49,796	182	472
California	250	97	38,965,193	155,779	403,466
Illinois	226	87	12,549,689	55,519	143,793
Hawaii	223	86	1,435,138	6,423	16,635
North Carolina	223	86	10,835,491	48,618	125,920
Virginia	221	85	8,715,698	39,490	102,279
Georgia	192	74	11,029,227	57,513	148,959
Indiana	192	74	6,862,199	35,826	92,789
South Carolina	179	69	5,373,555	30,061	77,857
Michigan	178	69	10,037,261	56,539	146,435
Tennessee	173	67	7,126,489	41,235	106,798
New Hampshire	157	60	1,402,054	8,953	23,187
Washington	118	45	7,812,880	66,456	172,119
Texas	117	45	30,503,301	261,232	676,587
Kentucky	115	44	4,526,154	39,486	102,269
Wisconsin	109	42	5,910,955	54,158	140,268
Louisiana	106	41	4,573,749	43,204	111,898
Alabama	101	39	5,108,468	50,645	131,171
Missouri	90	35	6,196,156	68,742	178,040
West Virginia	74	28	1,770,071	24,038	62,259
Minnesota	72	28	5,737,915	79,627	206,232
Vermont	70	27	647,464	9,217	23,871
Arizona	65	25	7,431,344	113,594	294,207
Mississippi	63	24	2,939,690	46,923	121,531
Oklahoma	59	23	4,053,824	68,595	177,660
Arkansas	59	23	3,067,732	52,035	134,771
Iowa	57	22	3,207,004	55,857	144,669
Colorado	57	22	5,877,610	103,642	268,431
Maine	45	17	1,395,722	30,843	79,883
Oregon	44	17	4,233,358	95,988	248,608
Utah	42	16	3,417,735	82,170	212,818
Kansas	36	14	2,940,546	81,759	211,754
Nevada	29	11	3,194,176	109,781	284,332
Nebraska	26	10	1,978,379	76,824	198,974
Idaho	24	9.2	1,964,726	82,643	214,045
New Mexico	17	6.7	2,114,371	121,298	314,161
South Dakota	12	4.7	919,318	75,811	196,350
North Dakota	11	4.4	783,926	69,001	178,711
Montana	7.8	3.0	1,132,812	145,546	376,962
Wyoming	6.0	2.3	584,057	97,093	251,470
Alaska	1.3	0.50	733,406	570,641	1,477,953
Contiguous US	113	43	332,746,351	2,954,843	7,653,006
50 States	95	37	334,235,923	3,531,846	9,147,436
50 States and DC	95	37	334,914,895	3,531,907	9,147,594
United States	96	37	338,486,000	3,531,905	9,147,593

== Gallery ==
Gallery of U.S. states
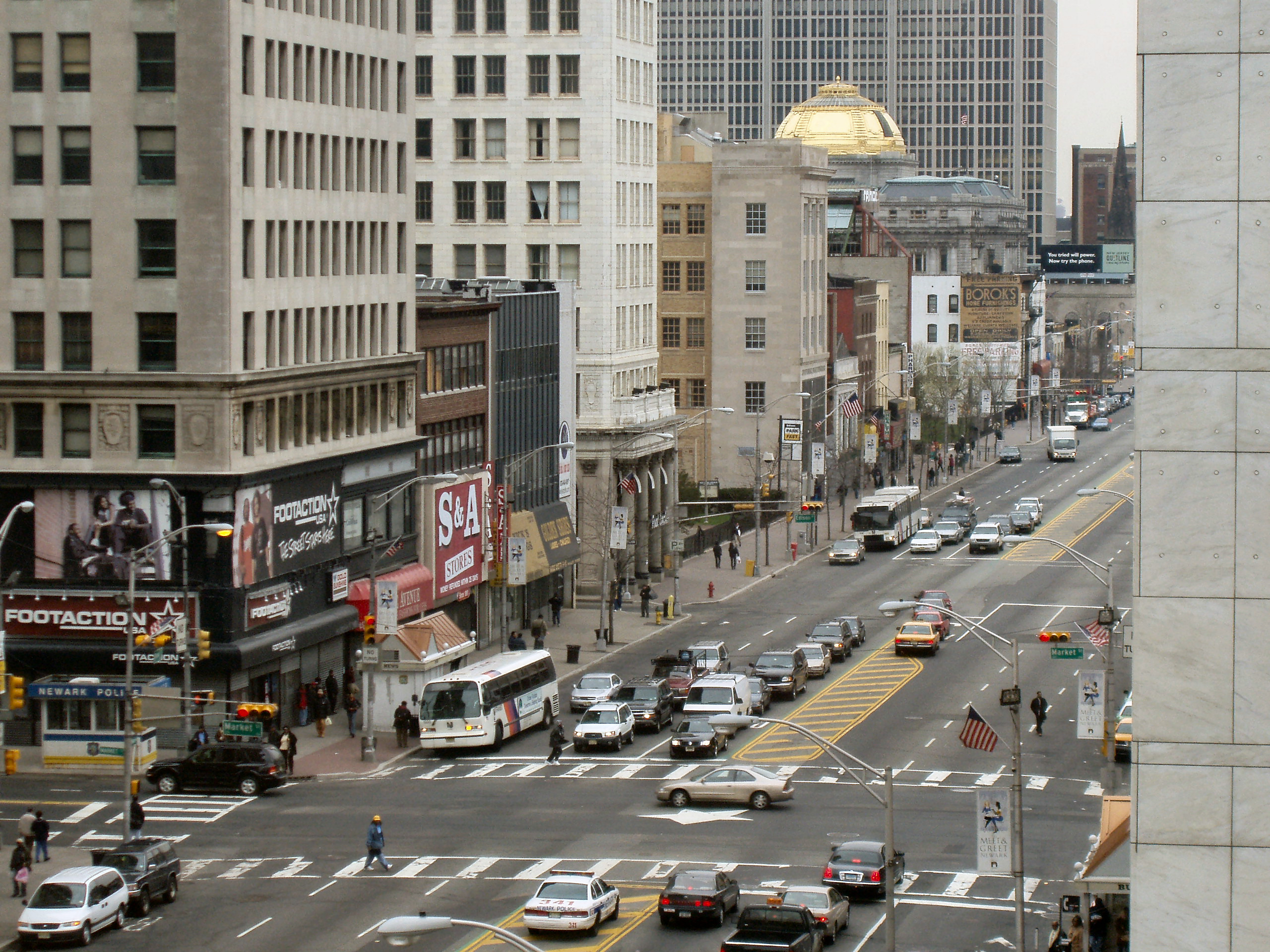
New Jersey is the most densely populated state.

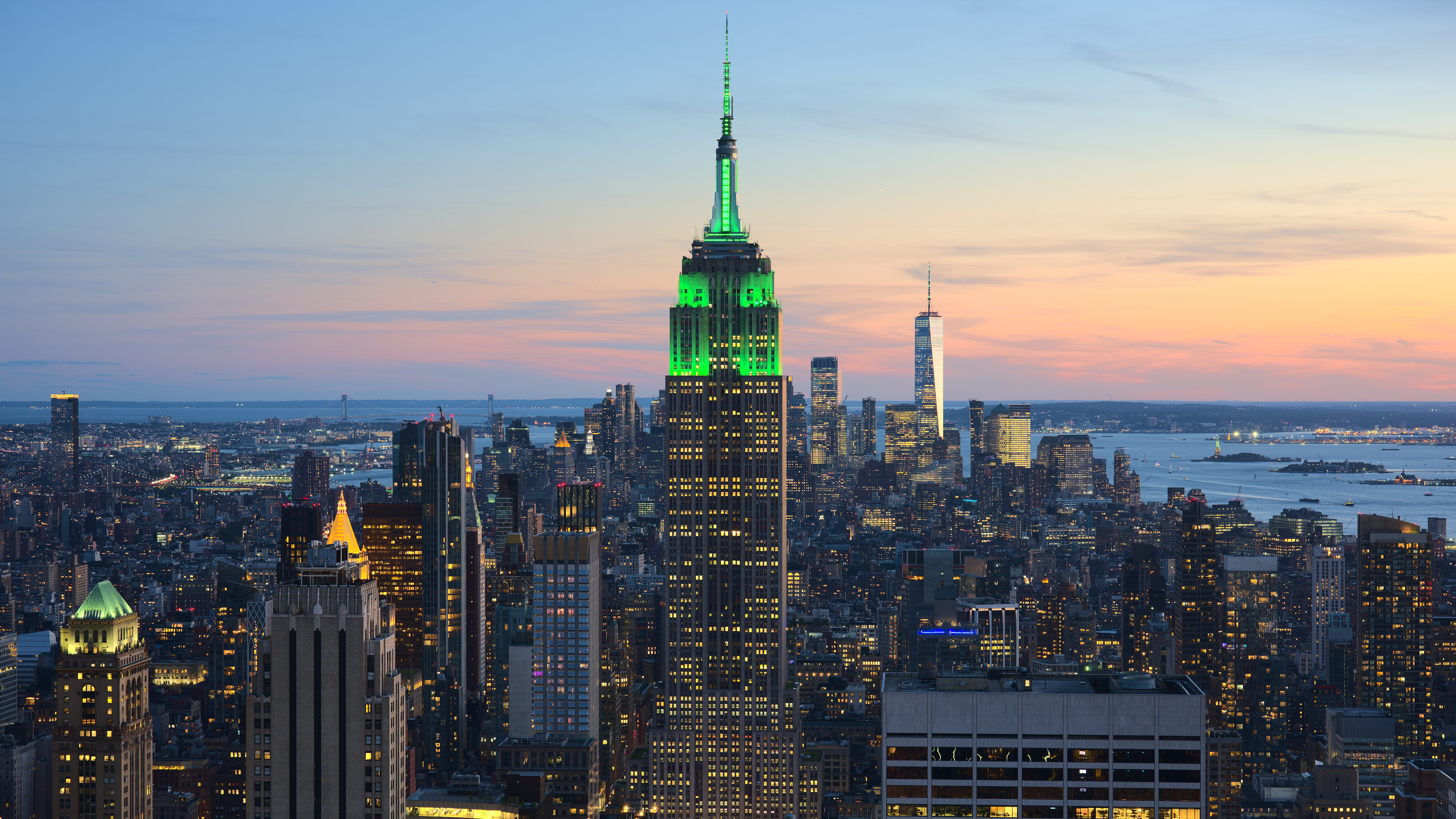
New York is home to the most populous city in the country, and ranks 8th among the states in density.

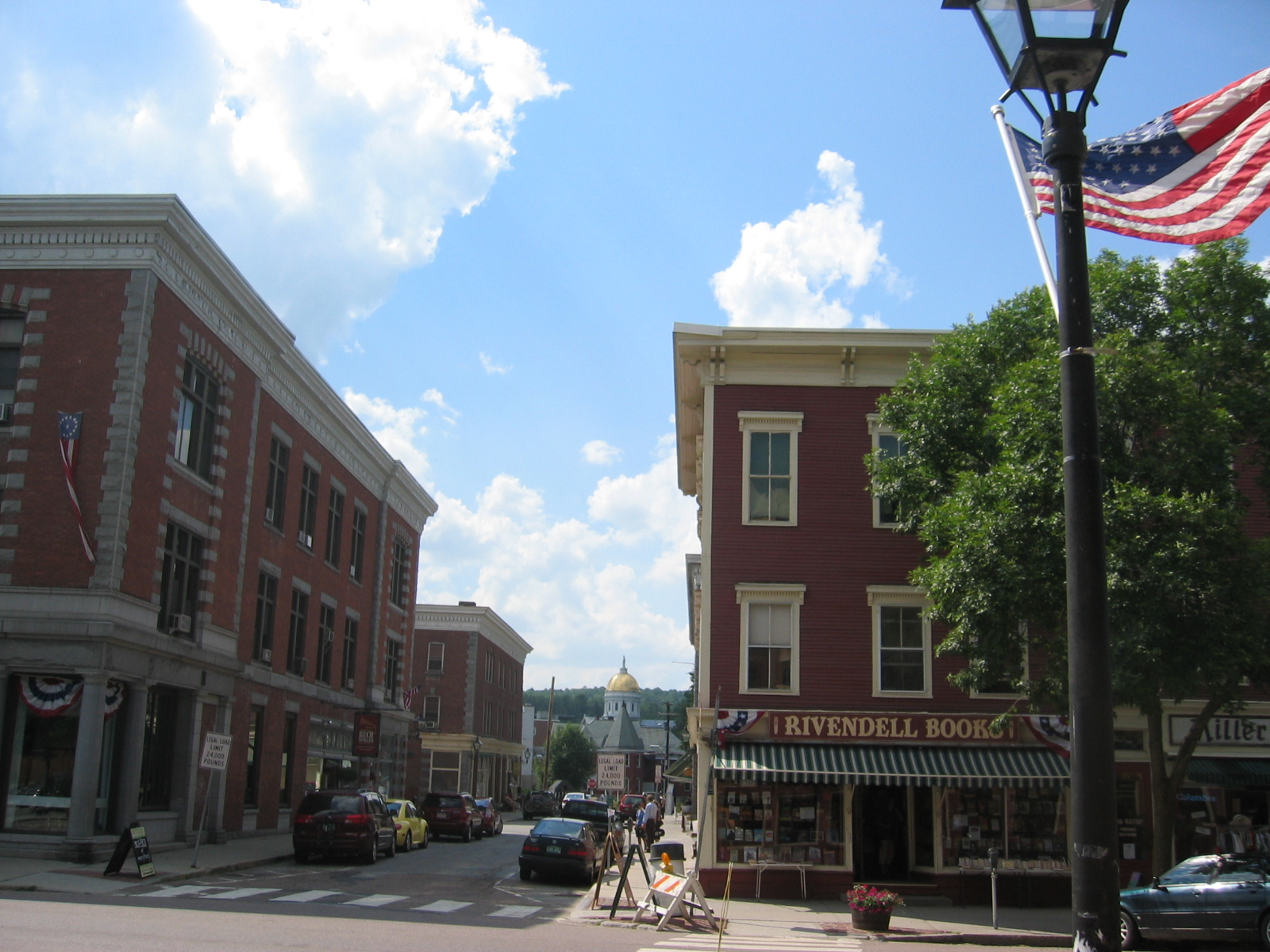
Despite a small population, Vermont has a fairly average population density because of its small area.

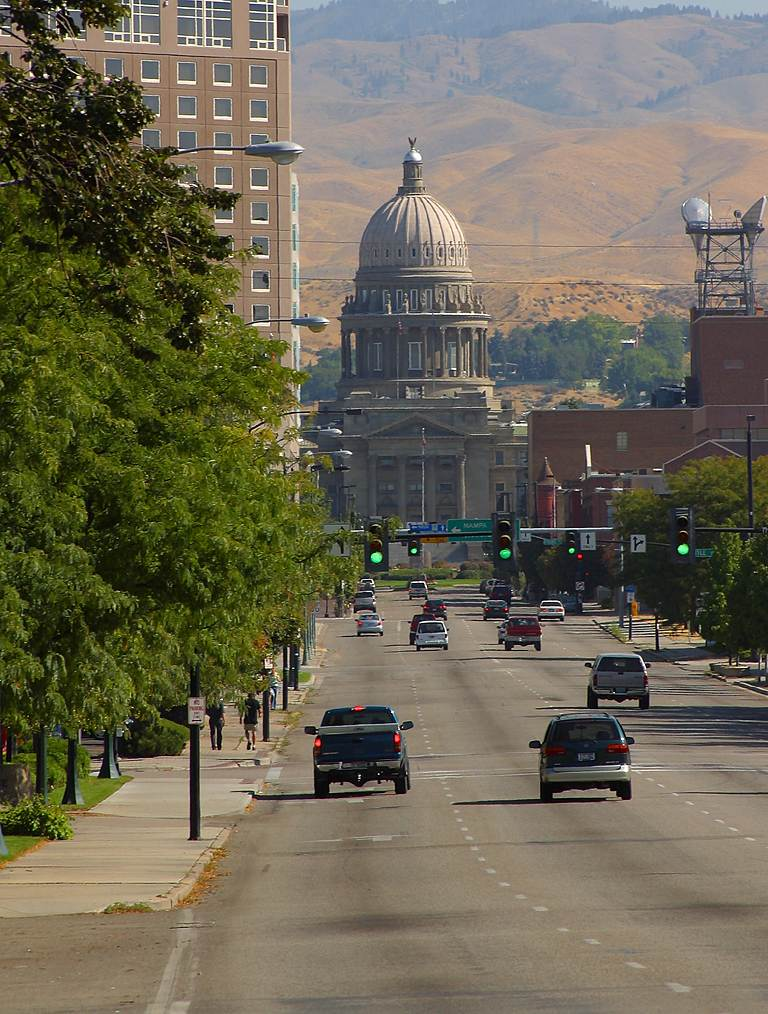
Idaho's population has increased rapidly in recent decades, but its population density is lower than other states.

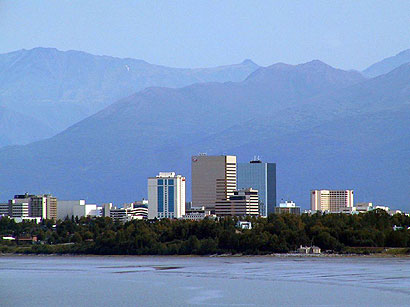
About half of the population of Alaska lives in the Anchorage metropolitan area.

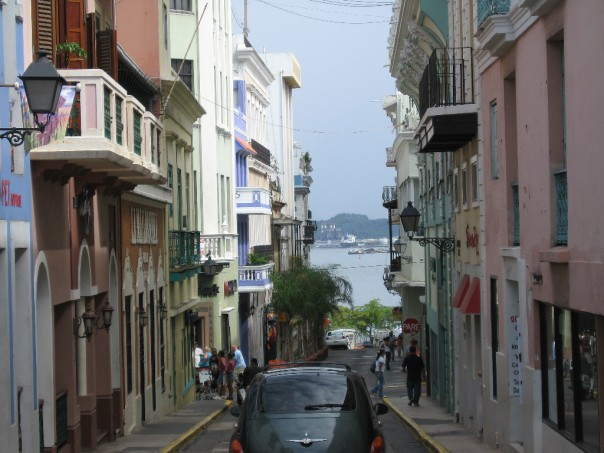
Puerto Rico is the fourth most densely populated of states and possessions of the U.S.

== See also ==
- List of U.S. states and territories by area
- Demographics of the United States
  - List of U.S. states by population
  - List of United States cities by population density
  - List of U.S. states by historical population
  - List of U.S. states by African-American population
  - List of U.S. states by fertility rate
