= List of countries and territories by motor vehicles per capita =

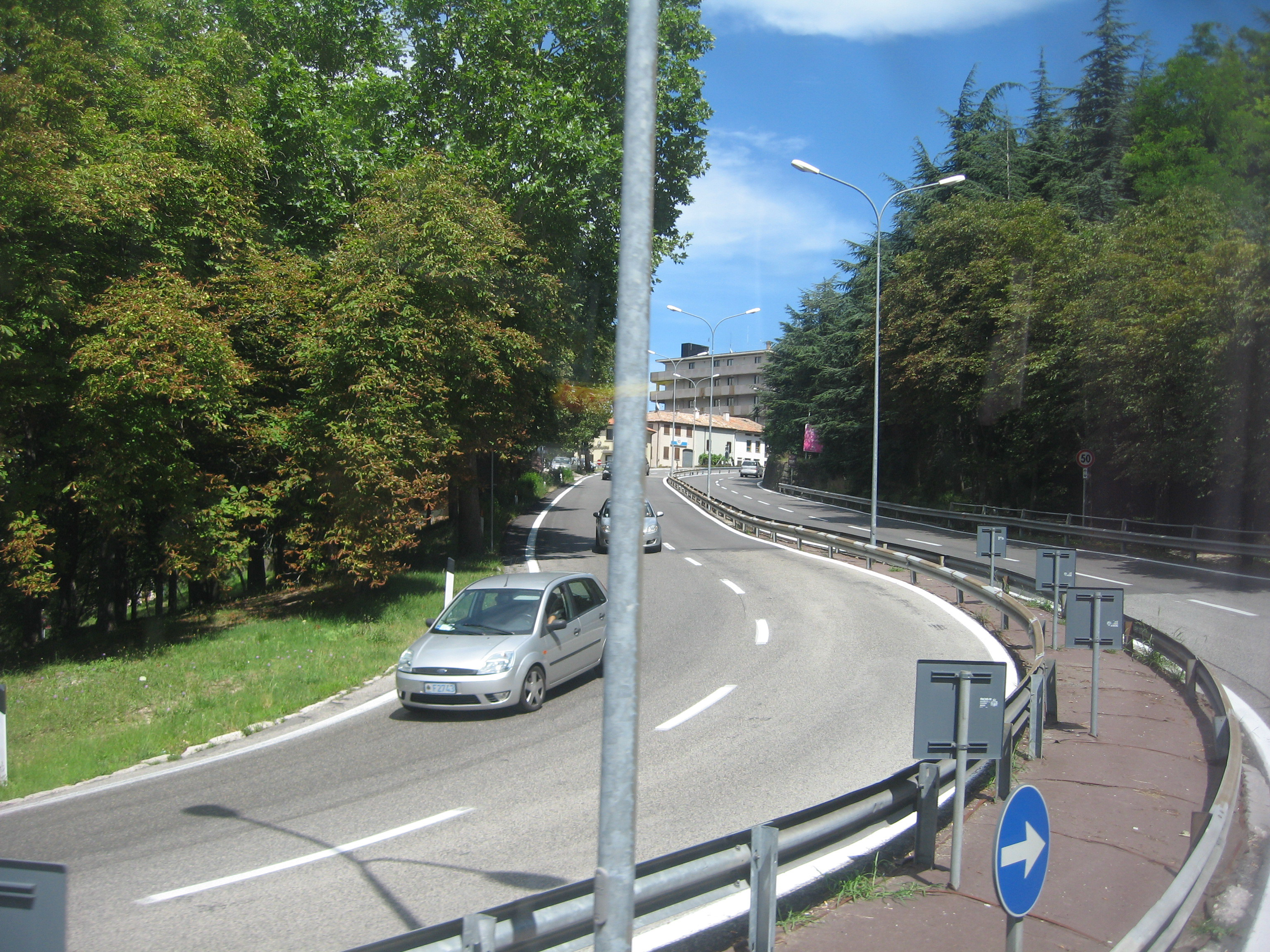
Microstates such as San Marino, Andorra and Liechtenstein have high official rates of car ownership.

Countries and territories listed by the number of road motor vehicles per 1,000 inhabitants are as follows.

Population figures are from the United Nations Statistics Division unless otherwise specified.

Region	Vehicles per 1,000 people	Road motor vehicles	Population	Year	Ref
San Marino	1,606	53,940	33,581	2024	
Guernsey (UK)	1,389	88,532	63,726	2022	
Jersey (UK)	1,234	127,911	103,675	2023	
Andorra	1,214	98,183	80,856	2023	
Malaysia	1,102	38,700,000	35,126,298	2025	
Brunei	1,040	475,000	455,370	2022	
Taiwan	999	23,353,315	23,374,742	2025	
New Zealand	881	4,700,000	5,334,200	2023	
Luxembourg	818	550,580	673,036	2024	
United States	800	272,191,948	340,239,935	2024	
Guam (US)	790	133,375	168,803	2023	
Australia	781	21,264,995	27,219,194	2024	
Liechtenstein	767	31,340	39,870	2024	
Italy	753	44,888,074	59,619,115	2024	
Finland	752	4,221,852	5,617,311	2024	
Canada	750	30,478,530	40,638,040	2024	
Estonia	740	998,852	1,350,092	2024	
Japan	720	89,147,263	123,821,223	2024	
Portugal	691	7,198,871	10,417,073	2024	
Poland	671	25,757,062	38,385,739	2024	
France	667	44,444,965	66,667,448	2024	
Czech Republic	661	7,082,522	10,673,213	2024	
Cyprus	661	880,036	1,331,370	2024	
Bahamas	650	260,000	397,539	2022	
Lithuania	643	1,811,748	2,816,920	2024	
Spain	642	30,724,166	47,828,383	2024	
Iceland	639	306,563	393,396	2024	
Norway	630	3,469,692	5,519,167	2024	
Germany	627	52,714,433	84,086,227	2024	
Denmark	609	3,625,171	5,948,136	2024	
Switzerland	603	5,301,789	8,792,182	2024	
Antigua and Barbuda	598	54,891	91,846	2020	
Slovenia	587	1,228,051	2,115,228	2024	
United Kingdom	584	40,389,651	69,157,291	2024	
Trinidad and Tobago	582	831,803	1,429,189	2015	
Malta	576	438,567	532,956	2024	
Austria	569	5,185,006	9,104,772	2024	
Greece	555	5,777,241	10,412,480	2024	
Saint Kitts and Nevis	543	25,374	46,758	2023	
Ireland	536	2,737,924	5,110,016	2024	
Chile	532	10,703,022	20,112,271	2023	
Faroe Islands (Denmark)	522	28,562	54,714	2023	
Kuwait	521	2,522,933	4,838,782	2023	
South Korea	520	26,929,401	51,748,529	2023	
Costa Rica	514	2,600,000	5,059,988	2021	
Belgium	513	6,977,664	11,641,820	2024	
Netherlands	513	10,062,194	17,904,421	2024	
Croatia	513	2,070,123	3,907,027	2024	
Dominican Republic	513	5,810,888	11,331,266	2023	
Qatar	512	1,330,487	2,599,372	2016	
Slovakia	502	3,286,249	5,450,626	2024	
Argentina	499	23,008,383	46,121,783	2023	
Bulgaria	484	3,006,215	6,447,710	2024	
Bahrain	476	747,350	1,569,666	2023	
Sweden	470	5,682,251	10,487,338	2024	
Syria	466	9,810,000	21,049,429	2020	
Libya	463	3,260,000	7,045,399	2020	
Hungary	447	4,763,466	9,684,306	2024	
Romania	444	9,148,003	19,166,773	2024	
Brazil	443	95,467,023	215,348,697	2023	
Barbados	425	120,000	282,318	2022	
Latvia	424	871,153	1,881,063	2024	
Nauru	424	5,000	11,801	2022	
Israel	423	4,220,410	9,986,892	2024	
Montenegro	417	242,599	616,695	2024	
Georgia	414	1,680,400	3,807,492	2024	
Laos	412	3,116,550	7,559,008	2022	
Mexico	405	53,517,228	132,123,623	2025	
Suriname	394	241,391	612,317	2020	
Serbia	392	2,573,843	6,567,783	2025	
Thailand	391	27,407,882	70,163,786	2016	
Turkey	390	33,612,656	86,092,168	2025	
United Arab Emirates	376	3,391,125	9,030,873	2016	
Sri Lanka	366	8,352,213	22,834,965	2022	
Russia	355	51,436,224	145,022,111	2024	
Moldova	354	982,349	3,039,985	2024	
Macao	353	251,867	713,912	2023	
Mongolia	347	1,192,520	3,431,933	2023	
Belarus	338	3,153,223	9,316,778	2016	
China	333	472,032,031	1,416,096,094	2025	
Albania	328	867,765	2,811,655	2024	
Oman	323	1,704,873	5,281,538	2024	
Bosnia and Herzegovina	321	978,229	3,473,003	2024	
Panama	320	1,288,573	4,029,087	2016	
North Macedonia	318	483,482	1,837,114	2024	
Armenia	303	900,692	2,973,841	2024	
Ecuador	300	5,479,022	18,263,407	2022	
Lebanon	295	1,866,407	6,323,060	2016	
Botswana	292	653,274	2,234,776	2016	
Colombia	280	13,477,996	48,131,078	2017	
Dominica	271	18,311	67,573	2020	
Kazakhstan	250	5,085,400	20,330,104	2023	
Maldives	250	131,000	524,107	2022	
Liberia	248	1,085,075	4,373,044	2012	
Ukraine	237	10,500,000	44,298,640	2021	
Grenada	237	27,266	115,130	2016	
Kosovo	232	460,105	1,700,031	2024	
Saudi Arabia	224	6,895,799	30,717,809	2016	
Seychelles	210	23,076	109,821	2016	
South Africa	208	13,304,703	64,007,187	2024	
Saint Lucia	203	35,681	175,646	2016	
Jamaica	203	575,041	2,839,144	2022	
Kyrgyzstan	200	1,300,000	6,494,035	2019	
Guatemala	200	3,250,194	16,268,760	2016	
Belize	189	56,094	296,100	2007	
Algeria	187	8,669,438	46,237,059	2024	
Iran	182	15,963,000	87,723,443	2020	
Peru	182	5,604,789	30,866,494	2016	
Honduras	180	1,694,504	9,412,380	2016	
Philippines	179	20,465,515	113,964,339	2024	
Tunisia	175	2,015,601	11,528,674	2016	
Jordan	173	2,000,000	11,552,876	2024	
Singapore	172	996,732	5,789,090	2023	
Guyana	171	128,000	749,257	2010	
Azerbaijan	169	1,738,940	10,318,207	2023	
São Tomé and Príncipe	165	34,050	206,971	2017	
El Salvador	163	1,008,080	6,200,800	2016	
Bhutan	162	126,501	780,915	2022	
Tonga	158	16,717	105,567	2018	
Bolivia	153	1,711,005	11,180,020	2016	
Venezuela	149	4,235,000	28,444,078	2020	
Namibia	148	418,292	2,506,853	2017	
Fiji	142	130,000	914,963	2020	
Myanmar	132	7,138,410	54,133,798	2022	
Cape Verde	127	64,955	512,554	2016	
Greenland (Denmark)	126	7,054	55,923	2023	
Samoa	124	25,235	203,499	2016	
Hong Kong	124	925,171	7,465,915	2022	
Pakistan	121	30,000,000	247,504,496	2023	
Morocco	113	4,120,000	36,584,208	2020	
Burkina Faso	112	2,106,292	18,777,487	2015	
Iraq	112	4,715,000	42,116,605	2020	
Indonesia	100	23,050,000	281,190,067	2025	
Zimbabwe	91	1,467,955	16,069,056	2022	
Uzbekistan	87	3,051,734	34,938,956	2022	
Egypt	87	9,950,000	114,535,772	2023	
Nepal	84	2,339,169	27,823,629	2015	
Gambia	78	200,000	2,576,010	2021	
Chad	74	1,124,000	15,114,655	2016	
Ghana	70	2,066,943	29,356,742	2016	
Kenya	62	2,979,910	48,139,687	2016	
Nigeria	59	13,500,000	218,529,287	2021	
Palestine	59	268,365	4,521,565	2015	
Cuba	56	633,369	11,265,612	2016	
Afghanistan	55	2,342,543	42,647,492	2024	
Tajikistan	50	439,972	8,865,631	2016	
Comoros	47	34,898	741,741	2016	
Zambia	45	853,909	19,059,395	2020	
Vietnam	43	4,180,480	98,079,191	2020	
Uganda	41	1,594,962	38,799,152	2016	
Sierra Leone	41	300,000	7,379,299	2017	
Tanzania	40	2,163,623	53,824,013	2016	
Benin	40	469,761	11,697,842	2016	
India	38	50,000,000	1,328,024,498	2024	
Djibouti	35	40,000	1,137,096	2022	
Ivory Coast	35	905,537	25,989,405	2016	
Bangladesh	34	5,982,765	173,562,364	2024	
Guinea-Bissau	34	62,239	1,831,894	2016	
Cameroon	32	758,145	23,454,162	2016	
Senegal	32	468,051	14,593,331	2015	
Kiribati	31	3,706	120,275	2017	
Sudan	30	1,252,740	41,259,892	2016	
Mozambique	26	698,864	27,337,105	2016	
Eritrea	23	72,405	3,124,698	2016	
Guinea	22	259,731	12,073,030	2016	
Cambodia	21	370,000	17,423,881	2023	
Niger	21	436,420	20,685,754	2016	
Solomon Islands	21	11,000	532,968	2010	
Rwanda	20	264,524	13,065,837	2020	
Mali	19	344,345	18,593,022	2015	
Papua New Guinea	11	100,993	8,961,718	2016	
Ethiopia	10	1,200,110	118,917,672	2020	
Burundi	9.7	111,236	11,506,762	2017	
Madagascar	9.3	236,979	25,426,703	2015	
Togo	8.2	64,118	7,858,289	2016	
Central African Republic	8.1	37,475	4,623,182	2014	
Somalia	4.5	59,457	13,339,491	2014	
North Korea	1.1	30,000	26,498,823	2024	

== See also ==
- Automotive industry
- Car ownership
- List of countries by motor vehicle production
- List of U.S. states by vehicles per capita
- Peak car
