= List of states by population density =

List of states by population density may refer to:

- List of U.S. states and territories by population density
- List of countries and dependencies by population density
