= List of U.S. metropolitan areas with large African-American populations =

List of American metropolitan areas with significant Black populations

The following is a list of the 100 largest metropolitan areas in the United States with large African American populations. As a result of slavery, more than half of African Americans live in the South. The data is sourced from the 2010 and 2020 United States Censuses.

== By 2020 Census population ==
Rank	City	Metropolitan Area Population 2020 United States Census	African-American Population Size, 100,000 or more (2020 United States Census)	African-American Population Size (2010 Census)	% Change (2010–2020)	Percentage African-American (2020)
1	New York, New York (NY-NJ-PA) MSA	20,140,470	3,237,789	3,352,616	−3.42%	16.1
2	Atlanta, Georgia MSA	6,089,815	2,084,212	1,707,913	+22.03%	34.2
3	Chicago, Illinois (IL-IN-WI) MSA	9,618,502	1,576,952	1,645,993	−4.19%	16.4
4	Washington, District of Columbia (DC-MD-VA-WV) MSA	6,385,162	1,562,340	1,438,436	+8.61%	24.5
5	Philadelphia, Pennsylvania (PA-NJ-DE-MD) MSA	6,245,051	1,273,120	1,241,780	+2.52%	20.4
6	Houston, Texas MSA	7,122,240	1,267,934	1,023,065	+23.93%	18
7	Dallas-Fort Worth, Texas MSA	7,637,387	1,220,934	961,800	+26.94%	16.0
8	Miami, Florida MSA	6,138,333	1,194,334	1,206,470	−1.01%	19.5
9	Detroit, Michigan MSA	4,392,041	961,076	980,451	−1.98%	21.9
10	Los Angeles, California MSA	13,200,998	848,206	907,618	−6.55%	6.4
11	Baltimore, Maryland MSA	2,844,510	811,018	778,879	+4.13%	28.5
12	Memphis, Tennessee (TN-AR-MS) MSA	1,337,779	612,104	601,043	+1.84%	45.8
13	Charlotte, North Carolina (NC-SC) MSA	2,660,329	581,927	421,105	+38.19%	21.9
14	Norfolk-Virginia Beach-Newport News, Virginia (VA-NC) MSA	1,799,674	544,740	522,409	+4.27%	30.3
15	St. Louis, Missouri (MO-IL) MSA	2,820,253	506,762	516,446	−1.88%	18.0
16	New Orleans, Louisiana MSA	1,271,845	423,909	397,095	+6.75%	33.3
17	Orlando, Florida MSA	2,673,376	410,855	344,820	+19.15%	15.4
18	Cleveland-Lorain-Elyria, Ohio MSA	2,088,251	410,206	416,528	−1.52%	19.6
19	Tampa-St. Petersburg-Clearwater, Florida MSA	3,175,275	375,855	329,334	+14.13%	11.8
20	Richmond-Petersburg, Virginia MSA	1,314,434	364,714	375,427	−2.85%	27.7
21	Boston, Massachusetts (MA-NH) NECMA	4,941,632	364,054	331,292	+9.89%	7.4
22	San Juan-Caguas-Guaynabo, Puerto Rico MSA	2,081,265	N/A	344,956	N/A	16.6
23	Jacksonville, Florida MSA	1,605,848	341,206	292,881	+16.50%	21.2
24	Riverside-San Bernardino, California MSA	4,599,839	341,035	322,405	+5.78%	7.4
25	Minneapolis-Saint Paul MSA	3,690,261	337,652	243,414	+38.72%	9.1
26	San Francisco-Oakland, California MSA	4,749,008	335,135	363,905	−7.91%	7.1
27	Columbus, Ohio MSA	2,138,926	334,842	273,560	+22.40%	15.7
28	Birmingham, Alabama MSA	1,115,289	328,242	318,373	+3.10%	29.4
29	Indianapolis, Indiana MSA	2,111,040	317,192	263,376	+20.43%	15.0
30	Baton Rouge, Louisiana MSA	870,569	302,477	285,911	+5.79%	34.7
31	Las Vegas, Nevada MSA	2,265,461	286,684	204,379	+40.27%	12.7
32	Nashville-Murfreesboro-Franklin, Tennessee MSA	1,989,519	284,784	242,264	+17.55%	14.3
33	Jackson, Mississippi MSA	591,978	282,692	257,021	+9.99%	47.8
34	Phoenix-Mesa-Glendale, Arizona MSA	4,845,832	282,437	207,734	+35.96%	5.8
35	Cincinnati, Ohio (OH-KY-IN) MSA	2,256,884	273,322	255,905	+6.81%	12.1
36	Columbia, South Carolina MSA	829,470	269,093	255,104	+5.48%	32.4
37	Kansas City, Missouri (MO-KS) MSA	2,192,035	262,220	254,509	+3.03%	12.0
38	Raleigh-Cary, North Carolina MSA	1,413,982	258,213	228,268	+13.12%	18.3
39	Milwaukee-Waukesha, Wisconsin MSA	1,574,731	255,992	261,010	−1.92%	16.3
40	Seattle, Washington MSA	4,018,762	246,767	191,967	+28.55%	6.1
41	Augusta, Georgia (GA-SC) MSA	611,000	212,570	196,695	+8.07%	34.8
42	Greensboro-High Point, North Carolina MSA	776,566	207,385	184,730	+12.26%	26.7
43	Pittsburgh, Pennsylvania MSA	2,370,930	199,469	196,755	+1.38%	8.4
44	Louisville, Kentucky MSA (KY-IN) MSA	1,285,439	189,663	176,107	+7.70%	14.8
45	Charleston-North Charleston, South Carolina MSA	799,636	183,724	184,019	−0.16%	23.0
46	San Antonio-New Braunfels, Texas MSA	2,558,143	181,016	141,468	+27.96%	7.1
47	Little Rock, Arkansas MSA	748,031	173,297	155,081	+11.75%	23.2
48	Fayetteville, North Carolina MSA	520,378	171,793	132,833	+29.33%	34.3
49	Sacramento, California MSA	2,397,382	167,386	158,426	+5.66%	7.0
50	Montgomery, Alabama MSA	386,047	167,315	159,330	+5.01%	43.3
51	Denver-Aurora, Colorado MSA	2,963,821	166,100	143,128	+16.05%	5.6
52	Durham-Chapel Hill, North Carolina MSA	649,903	162,744	136,543	+19.19%	25.0
53	Austin-Round Rock-San Marcos, Texas MSA	2,283,371	160,079	127,397	+25.65%	7.0
54	San Diego-Carlsbad-San Marcos, California MSA	3,298,634	155,813	158,213	−1.52%	4.7
55	Shreveport, Louisiana MSA	393,406	155,018	155,174	−0.10%	39.4
56	Buffalo-Niagara Falls-Cheektowaga, New York MSA	1,166,902	151,535	138,782	+9.19%	13.0
57	Mobile, Alabama MSA	430,197	149,572	142,992	+4.60%	34.8
58	Oklahoma City, Oklahoma MSA	1,425,695	146,494	130,597	+12.17%	10.3
59	Greenville-Anderson, South Carolina MSA	928,195	143,173	106,284	+34.71%	15.4
60	Hartford, Connecticut MSA	1,213,531	141,209	131,929	+7.03%	11.6
61	Columbus, Georgia (GA-AL) MSA	328,883	136,849	119,023	+14.98%	41.6
62	Dayton-Kettering, Ohio MSA	814,049	127,807	125,815	+1.58%	15.7
63	Rochester, New York MSA	1,090,135	127,406	122,611	+3.91%	11.7
64	Savannah, Georgia MSA	404,798	124,644	117,726	+5.88%	30.8
65	Tallahassee, Florida MSA	384,298	121,168	119,320	+1.55%	31.5
66	New Haven-Milford, Connecticut MSA	864,835	118,933	109,850	+8.27%	13.8
67	Lafayette, Louisiana MSA	478,384	117,267	73,112	+60.39%	24.5
68	Winston-Salem, North Carolina MSA	675,966	116,597	96,928	+20.29%	17.2
69	Bridgeport-Stamford-Norwalk, Connecticut MSA	957,419	106,756	99,317	+7.49%	11.2
70	Lakeland-Winter Haven, Florida MSA	725,046	105,533	88,833	+18.80%	14.6
71	Huntsville, Alabama MSA	491,723	105,373	90,805	+16.04%	21.4
72	Macon, Georgia MSA	233,802	104,157	100,934	+3.19%	44.5

== See also ==
- African American neighborhoods
- List of African American neighborhoods
- List of U.S. cities with large African-American populations
- List of U.S. states by African-American population
- List of West Indian communities in the United States
