= List of majority-Black counties in the United States =

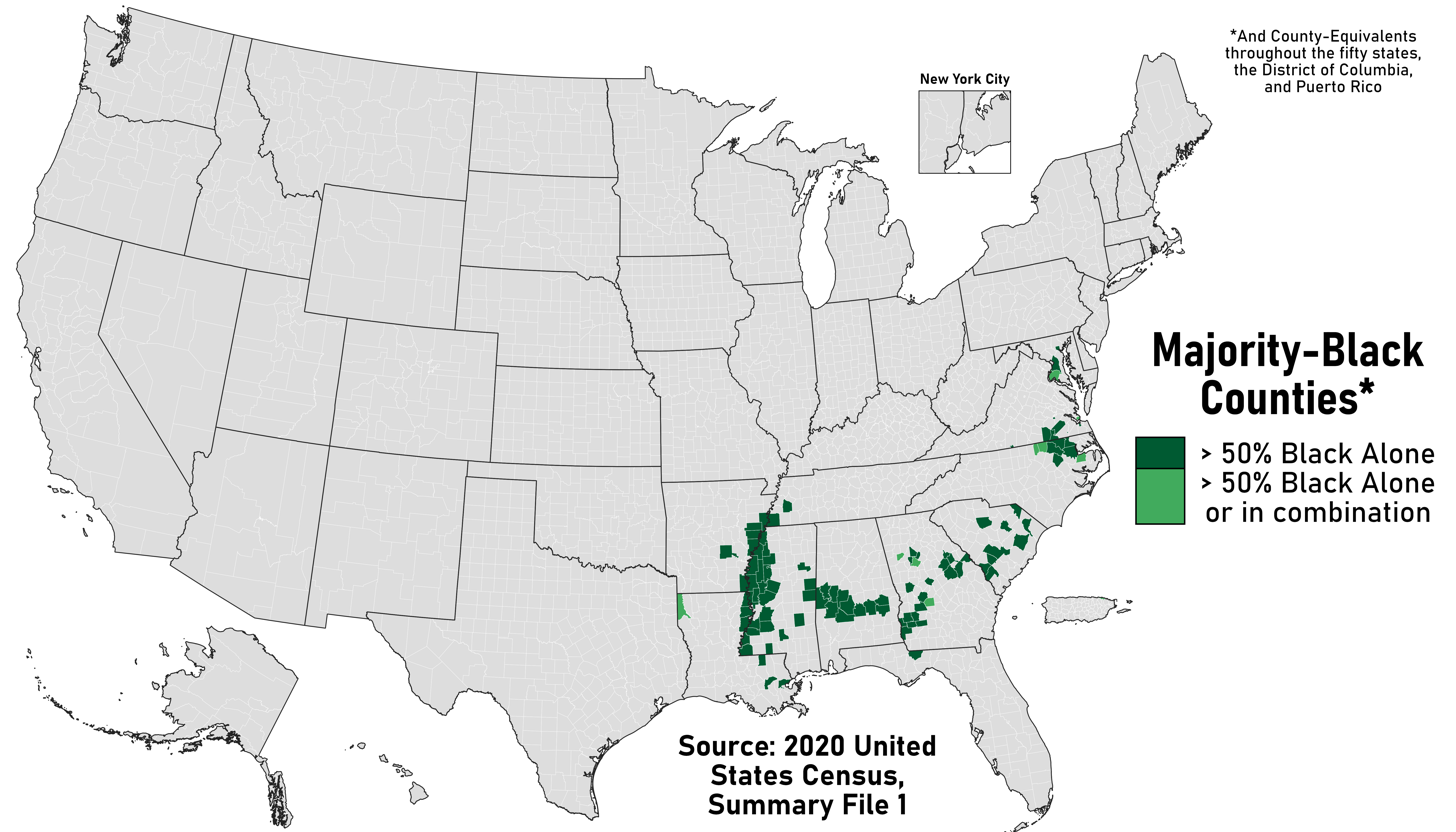
Majority-black Counties in the U.S. as of the 2020 United States Census

This list of majority-black counties in the United States covers the counties and county-equivalents in the 50 U.S. states, the District of Columbia, and the territory of United States Virgin Islands, Puerto Rico and the population in each county that is Black or African American.

The data source for the list is the 2020 United States Census.

At the time of the 2020 Census, there were 47.5 million Americans who were black (either alone or in combination), making up 14.2% of the U.S. population. State by state, the highest number of Black Americans could be found in Texas (3.96 million), Florida (3.70 million), Georgia (3.54 million), New York state (3.53 million), and California (2.83 million). Meanwhile, the highest proportions of African Americans were in the District of Columbia (44.17%), Mississippi (37.94%), Louisiana (33.13%), Georgia (33.03%), and Maryland (32.01%).

Throughout the country, there are 104 county-equivalents where over 50% of the population identified as black (either alone or in combination). Of these, 25 were in Mississippi, 22 were in Georgia, and 11 were in Alabama. Moreover, there were nine counties in both South Carolina and Virginia with black majorities. North Carolina had eight majority-black counties, Louisiana had seven, Arkansas had six, Maryland had three, Tennessee had two, and Florida and Puerto Rico each had one majority-Black county.

In 2020, the most populated counties which had a black majority were Prince George's County, Maryland (population 967K), Shelby County, Tennessee (population 930K), DeKalb County, Georgia (population 764K), Baltimore, Maryland (population 586K), and Orleans Parish, Louisiana (population 384K).

== List ==
The list below displays each majority-black county (or county-equivalent) in the fifty U.S. states, the District of Columbia, and Puerto Rico. It includes the county's total population, the number of black people in the county, and the percentage of people in the county who are black as of the 2020 Census. The table is initially sorted by the black proportion of each county but is sortable by any of its columns, as can be found by clicking the table headers.

Counties in Puerto Rico are shaded in yellow. Counties where people who are black alone do not make a majority while people who are either black Alone or in combination with another race do make a majority are italicized.

County	State	Black %	Black alone %	Population	Black population	Black alone population
Claiborne	Mississippi	88.60%	87.45%	9,135	8,094	7,989
Jefferson	Mississippi	86.72%	85.28%	7,260	6,296	6,191
Holmes	Mississippi	85.23%	83.86%	17,000	14,489	14,256
Greene	Alabama	82.20%	80.80%	7,730	6,354	6,246
Macon	Alabama	80.85%	79.05%	19,532	15,792	15,441
Humphreys	Mississippi	80.39%	78.48%	7,785	6,258	6,110
Tunica	Mississippi	78.36%	77.27%	9,782	7,665	7,559
Coahoma	Mississippi	77.56%	76.12%	21,390	16,590	16,281
Petersburg	Virginia	77.19%	74.16%	33,458	25,826	24,811
Leflore	Mississippi	75.10%	73.73%	28,339	21,283	20,895
Quitman	Mississippi	75.08%	73.61%	6,176	4,637	4,546
Sumter	Alabama	73.85%	72.88%	12,345	9,117	8,997
Clayton	Georgia	72.70%	69.89%	297,595	216,351	207,981
Washington	Mississippi	72.57%	71.33%	44,922	32,601	32,042
Sharkey	Mississippi	72.34%	70.76%	3,800	2,749	2,689
Bullock	Alabama	72.34%	71.41%	10,357	7,492	7,396
Noxubee	Mississippi	72.19%	70.27%	10,285	7,425	7,227
Allendale	South Carolina	71.76%	70.36%	8,039	5,769	5,656
Wilcox	Alabama	71.68%	70.59%	10,600	7,598	7,483
Dougherty	Georgia	71.64%	69.92%	85,790	61,457	59,988
Dallas	Alabama	71.49%	69.94%	38,462	27,497	26,899
Lowndes	Alabama	71.15%	69.75%	10,311	7,336	7,192
Perry	Alabama	71.08%	69.75%	8,511	6,050	5,936
Sunflower	Mississippi	71.03%	69.94%	25,971	18,448	18,164
Hinds	Mississippi	70.86%	69.43%	227,742	161,374	158,112
East Carroll	Louisiana	70.68%	69.55%	7,459	5,272	5,188
Hancock	Georgia	70.19%	69.01%	8,735	6,131	6,028
Wilkinson	Mississippi	69.08%	67.39%	8,587	5,932	5,787
Emporia	Virginia	66.04%	63.39%	5,766	3,808	3,655
Calhoun	Georgia	65.12%	64.26%	5,573	3,629	3,581
Williamsburg	South Carolina	64.68%	63.39%	31,026	20,068	19,666
Loíza	Puerto Rico	64.65%	31.79%	23,693	15,318	7,533
Bolivar	Mississippi	63.81%	62.50%	30,985	19,770	19,365
Phillips	Arkansas	63.74%	62.43%	16,568	10,560	10,343
Madison	Louisiana	63.52%	62.13%	10,017	6,363	6,224
Prince George's	Maryland	63.03%	59.83%	967,201	609,663	578,703
Kemper	Mississippi	62.36%	61.14%	8,988	5,605	5,495
Lee	South Carolina	62.32%	61.00%	16,531	10,302	10,084
Terrell	Georgia	62.13%	60.59%	9,185	5,707	5,565
Orangeburg	South Carolina	62.07%	60.61%	84,223	52,275	51,046
Bertie	North Carolina	61.54%	59.77%	17,934	11,036	10,720
Randolph	Georgia	61.43%	60.34%	6,425	3,947	3,877
Rockdale	Georgia	61.13%	58.15%	93,570	57,204	54,409
Yazoo	Mississippi	60.77%	59.57%	26,743	16,252	15,931
Baltimore City	Maryland	60.42%	57.79%	585,708	353,890	338,478
Macon	Georgia	60.39%	59.29%	12,082	7,296	7,164
Jefferson Davis	Mississippi	60.15%	58.68%	11,321	6,810	6,643
Warren	Georgia	59.98%	58.54%	5,215	3,128	3,053
Bamberg	South Carolina	59.61%	58.32%	13,311	7,935	7,763
Greensville	Virginia	59.49%	58.44%	11,391	6,776	6,657
Tallahatchie	Mississippi	59.42%	58.62%	12,715	7,555	7,454
St. John the Baptist	Louisiana	59.32%	57.22%	42,477	25,196	24,305
Hertford	North Carolina	59.31%	57.50%	21,552	12,783	12,393
Franklin	Virginia	59.03%	56.71%	8,180	4,829	4,639
Clay	Mississippi	58.97%	57.97%	18,636	10,989	10,803
Montgomery	Alabama	58.54%	56.98%	228,954	134,029	130,467
Adams	Mississippi	58.20%	56.83%	29,538	17,192	16,785
Richmond	Georgia	58.07%	55.27%	206,607	119,970	114,201
Marion	South Carolina	57.92%	56.21%	29,183	16,902	16,403
Edgecombe	North Carolina	57.82%	56.09%	48,900	28,274	27,429
Issaquena	Mississippi	57.77%	56.58%	1,338	773	757
Hale	Alabama	57.71%	56.39%	14,785	8,533	8,337
Jefferson	Arkansas	57.62%	56.25%	67,260	38,756	37,835
Clay	Georgia	57.37%	56.07%	2,848	1,634	1,597
Northampton	North Carolina	57.21%	55.46%	17,471	9,995	9,689
Orleans	Louisiana	57.02%	54.24%	383,997	218,969	208,273
Portsmouth	Virginia	56.75%	53.33%	97,915	55,570	52,214
Bibb	Georgia	56.48%	54.58%	157,346	88,865	85,885
Taliaferro	Georgia	56.19%	53.43%	1,559	876	833
Lee	Arkansas	56.13%	54.22%	8,600	4,827	4,663
Brunswick	Virginia	55.89%	54.31%	15,849	8,858	8,607
Tensas	Louisiana	55.75%	54.26%	4,147	2,312	2,250
St. Francis	Arkansas	55.54%	54.40%	23,090	12,825	12,561
Fairfield	South Carolina	55.49%	53.71%	20,948	11,625	11,251
Crittenden	Arkansas	55.44%	53.79%	48,163	26,700	25,905
St. Helena	Louisiana	55.23%	53.67%	10,920	6,031	5,861
Sussex	Virginia	55.10%	53.38%	10,829	5,967	5,781
Washington	Georgia	54.88%	53.65%	19,988	10,969	10,724
Talbot	Georgia	54.86%	53.71%	5,733	3,145	3,079
Gadsden	Florida	54.80%	53.47%	43,826	24,018	23,435
Pike	Mississippi	54.73%	53.47%	40,324	22,068	21,562
Chicot	Arkansas	54.31%	53.07%	10,208	5,544	5,417
Marengo	Alabama	53.82%	52.72%	19,323	10,400	10,188
Hampton	Virginia	53.65%	49.52%	137,148	73,579	67,915
Charles	Maryland	53.59%	49.24%	166,617	89,295	82,035
Danville	Virginia	53.38%	51.37%	42,590	22,734	21,879
DeKalb	Georgia	53.30%	50.89%	764,382	407,451	388,963
Shelby	Tennessee	53.00%	51.34%	929,744	492,757	477,321
Halifax	North Carolina	52.98%	51.10%	48,622	25,759	24,846
Hampton	South Carolina	52.78%	51.68%	18,561	9,796	9,592
Sumter	Georgia	52.49%	51.05%	29,616	15,546	15,120
Early	Georgia	52.40%	51.24%	10,854	5,688	5,562
Jefferson	Georgia	52.25%	50.77%	15,709	8,208	7,976
Marlboro	South Carolina	52.22%	50.22%	26,667	13,926	13,391
Henry	Georgia	52.02%	49.07%	240,712	125,211	118,124
Copiah	Mississippi	51.98%	50.56%	28,368	14,747	14,342
Jasper	Mississippi	51.97%	50.96%	16,367	8,506	8,341
Haywood	Tennessee	51.84%	50.56%	17,864	9,260	9,032
Vance	North Carolina	51.71%	49.88%	42,578	22,017	21,237
Douglas	Georgia	51.48%	48.44%	144,237	74,260	69,870
Warren	North Carolina	51.10%	48.89%	18,642	9,526	9,114
Dooly	Georgia	50.43%	49.62%	11,208	5,652	5,561
Washington	North Carolina	50.36%	48.85%	11,003	5,541	5,375
Caddo	Louisiana	50.16%	48.48%	237,848	119,304	115,298
Saint Thomas	United States Virgin Islands	?	80%	42,261	?	33,808
Saint Croix	United States Virgin Islands	?	76.3%	50,601	?	38,608
Saint John	United States Virgin Islands	?	?	3,881	?	?

African American Majority Counties Median Income (US Dollars)

1. Charles, Maryland 107,808
2. Prince George's, Maryland 91,124
3. Henry, Georgia 73,491
4. DeKalb, Georgia 69,423
5. Douglas, Georgia 67,731
6. Rockdale, Georgia 64,230
7. St John the Baptist, Louisiana 60,743
8. Hampton, Virginia 59,380
9. Lee, South Carolina 57,191
10. Sussex, Virginia 56,968
11. Shelby, Tennessee 55,015
12. Baltimore, Maryland 54,124
13. Portsmouth, Virginia 54,020
14. Greensville, Virginia 53,063
15. Montgomery, Alabama 52,511
16. Clayton, Georgia 51,945
17. Brunswick, Virginia 49,597
18. Franklin, Virginia 49,424
19. Copiah, Mississippi 46,530
20. Crittenden, Arkansas 46,452
21. Richmond, Georgia 46,237
22. Hinds, Mississippi 46,179
23. Orleans, Louisiana 45,594
24. Vance, North Carolina 45,243
25. Petersburg, Virginia 44,890
26. Bamberg, South Carolina 44,408
27. Bibb, Georgia 43,862
28. Jefferson, Arkansas 43,720
29. Hertford, North Carolina 43,523
30. Caddo, Louisiana 43,153
31. Gadsden, Florida 42,661
32. Jefferson, Georgia 42,238
33. Dougherty, Georgia 42,225
34. Edgecombe, North Carolina 41,974
35. Fairfield, South Carolina 41,755
36. Tunica, Mississippi 41,176
37. St Helena, Louisiana 40,857
38. Talbot, Georgia 40,719
39. Williamsburg, South Carolina 40,124
40. Yazoo, Mississippi 40,037
41. Jasper, Mississippi 39,992
42. Haywood, Tennessee 39,952
43. Northampton, North Carolina 39,764
44. Taliaferro, Georgia 39,670
45. Early, Georgia 39,665
46. Dooly, Georgia 39,641
47. Warren, North Carolina 39,588
48. Calhoun, Georgia 39,578
49. Washington, Georgia 39,350
50. Macon, Alabama 39,303
51. Noxubee, Mississippi 38,999
52. Sharkey, Mississippi 38,977
53. Danville, Virginia 38,904
54. Terrell, Georgia 38,879
55. Washington, North Carolina 38,843
56. Hampton, South Carolina 38,298
57. Orangeburg, South Carolina 38,052
58. Halifax, North Carolina 37,832
59. Kemper, Mississippi 37,667
60. Bertie, North Carolina 37,571
61. Warren, Georgia 37,309
62. Madison, Louisiana 36,875
63. Sumter, Georgia 36,687
64. Wilcox, Alabama 36,385
65. Pike, Mississippi 36,308
66. Emporia, Virginia 36,111
67. Clay, Georgia 35,893
68. Clay, Mississippi 35,638
69. Marengo, Alabama 35,379
70. St Francis, Arkansas 34,981
71. Dallas, Alabama 34,957
72. Jefferson Davis, Mississippi 34,771
73. Marion, South Carolina 34,465
74. Washington, Mississippi 34,399
75. Adams, Mississippi 33,860
76. Chicot, Arkansas 33,770
77. Bolivar, Mississippi 33,729
78. Hancock, Georgia 33,496
79. Macon, Georgia 33,163
80. Tensas, Louisiana 32,962
81. Sunflower, Mississippi 32,608
82. Hale, Alabama 32,294
83. Phillips, Arkansas 32,235
84. Marlboro, South Carolina 32,136
85. Lowndes, Alabama 31,961
86. Allendale, South Carolina 31,800
87. Tallahatchie, Mississippi 31,484
88. Wilkinson, Mississippi 31,412
89. Coahoma, Mississippi 31,312
90. Claiborne, Mississippi 31,305
91. Humphreys, Mississippi 30,327
92. Leflore, Mississippi 30,182
93. Jefferson, Mississippi 29,205
94. Lee, Arkansas 29,082
95. Bullock, Alabama 29,063
96. Randolph, Georgia 28,870
97. Greene, Alabama 28,826
98. Sumter, Alabama 27,099
99. Perry, Alabama 27,057
100. Quitman, Mississippi 25,783
101. East Carroll, Louisiana 25,049
102. Holmes, Mississippi 24,958
103. Loiza, Puerto Rico 19,541
104. Issaquena, Mississippi 17,109

Source: United States Census Bureau, 2023 https://www.census.gov/

== See also ==
- African Americans
  - List of U.S. states and territories by African-American population
  - List of U.S. cities with large Black populations
- List of majority-Hispanic or Latino counties in the United States
