= List of U.S. states and territories by fertility rate =

This is a list of U.S. states, federal district, and territories by total fertility rate.

Total Fertility Rate by U.S. state in 2021 according to the Center for Disease Control & Prevention

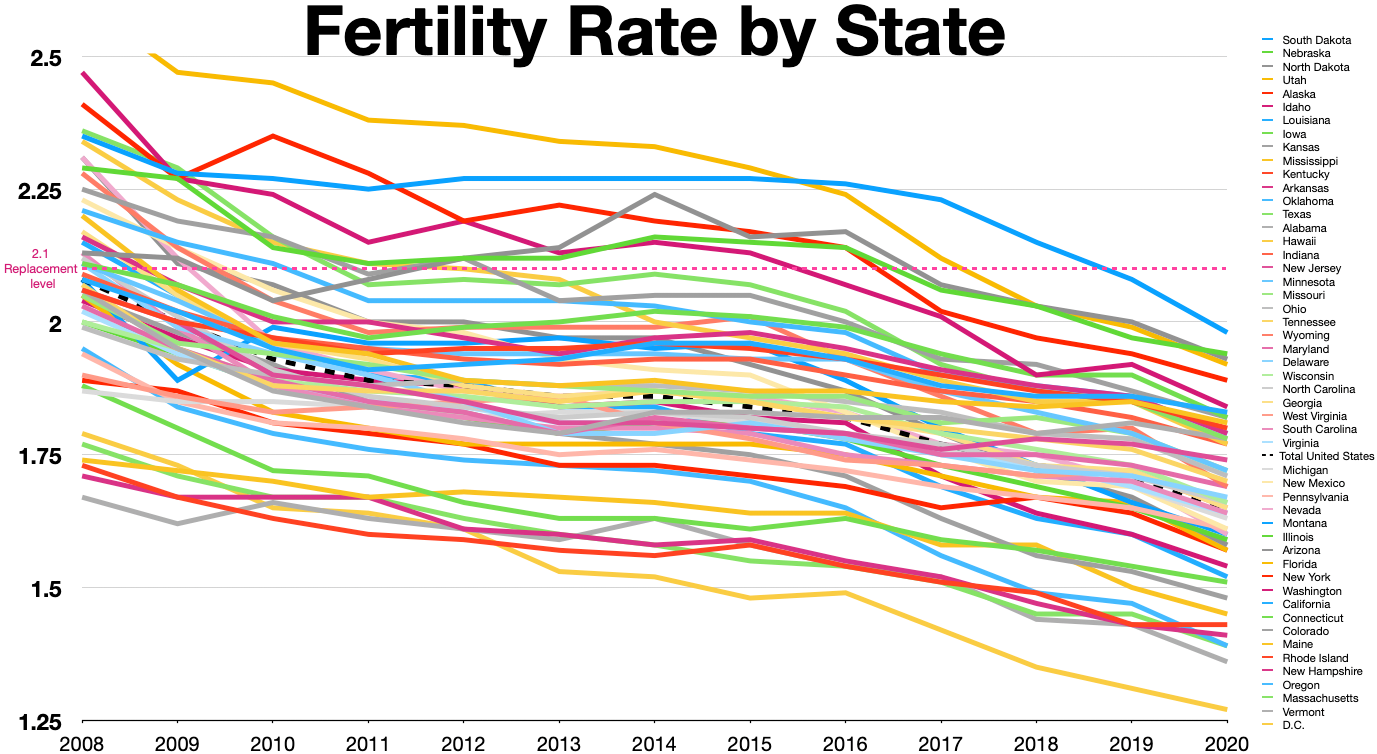
Fertility Rate by State 2008–2020

== 2019–2024 ==
State federal district or territory	TFR 2019	TFR 2020	TFR 2021	TFR 2022	TFR 2023	TFR 2024
American Samoa	--	--	--	--	--	2.29
Guam	2.74	2.64	2.36	2.26	2.11	2.10
Northern Mariana Is.	2.64	2.41	2.20	1.73	2.13	2.06
South Dakota	2.08	1.98	2.07	2.01	2.00	2.04
Nebraska	1.97	1.94	1.95	1.94	1.91	1.92
Idaho	1.92	1.84	1.85	1.81	1.79	1.82
North Dakota	2.00	1.93	1.94	1.84	1.85	1.81
Alaska	1.94	1.89	1.89	1.89	1.83	1.80
Iowa	1.90	1.82	1.85	1.84	1.81	1.80
Kentucky	1.85	1.80	1.81	1.82	1.80	1.80
Utah	1.99	1.92	1.92	1.85	1.80	1.80
Indiana	1.82	1.77	1.79	1.78	1.76	1.77
Kansas	1.87	1.82	1.84	1.83	1.81	1.77
Louisiana	1.86	1.83	1.87	1.85	1.83	1.77
Texas	1.85	1.78	1.81	1.84	1.81	1.77
Arkansas	1.86	1.79	1.84	1.79	1.77	1.76
Oklahoma	1.86	1.79	1.83	1.80	1.77	1.76
Mississippi	1.85	1.81	1.82	1.79	1.79	1.74
Alabama	1.81	1.78	1.77	1.74	1.73	1.72
Tennessee	1.76	1.70	1.75	1.73	1.73	1.72
Wyoming	1.80	1.69	1.75	1.69	1.68	1.70
Hawaii	1.85	1.77	1.73	1.74	1.68	1.68
Minnesota	1.79	1.72	1.75	1.75	1.69	1.67
Missouri	1.79	1.72	1.73	1.71	1.67	1.67
South Carolina	1.70	1.64	1.71	1.70	1.67	1.67
North Carolina	1.71	1.66	1.73	1.71	1.66	1.66
Ohio	1.78	1.71	1.72	1.70	1.68	1.65
Georgia	1.72	1.65	1.67	1.67	1.64	1.64
New Jersey	1.77	1.74	1.72	1.75	1.70	1.64
West Virginia	1.72	1.65	1.65	1.62	1.60	1.63
Delaware	1.71	1.67	1.68	1.71	1.63	1.61
Virginia	1.69	1.64	1.66	1.65	1.60	1.60
Wisconsin	1.73	1.66	1.69	1.65	1.63	1.60
Maryland	1.73	1.69	1.66	1.69	1.61	1.59
Montana	1.66	1.60	1.62	1.58	1.55	1.59
Arizona	1.67	1.58	1.64	1.62	1.60	1.57
New Mexico	1.69	1.61	1.58	1.59	1.55	1.56
Florida	1.66	1.57	1.62	1.64	1.60	1.55
Pennsylvania	1.65	1.61	1.61	1.58	1.55	1.53
Michigan	1.69	1.63	1.64	1.60	1.56	1.52
New York	1.64	1.57	1.56	1.56	1.53	1.51
Colorado	1.53	1.48	1.52	1.49	1.45	1.49
Connecticut	1.54	1.51	1.58	1.55	1.52	1.48
Nevada	1.70	1.60	1.61	1.56	1.50	1.48
Washington	1.60	1.54	1.56	1.53	1.47	1.48
Illinois	1.65	1.59	1.57	1.54	1.50	1.47
California	1.60	1.52	1.54	1.54	1.48	1.46
Maine	1.50	1.45	1.48	1.47	1.40	1.38
Massachusetts	1.45	1.39	1.43	1.44	1.40	1.38
U.S. Virgin Islands	--	1.39	1.46	1.43	1.40	1.37
Oregon	1.47	1.39	1.43	1.39	1.35	1.36
New Hampshire	1.43	1.41	1.48	1.41	1.38	1.35
Rhode Island	1.43	1.43	1.42	1.40	1.37	1.33
Vermont	1.43	1.36	1.37	1.35	1.30	1.27
District of Columbia	1.31	1.27	1.34	1.24	1.20	1.11
Puerto Rico	0.98	0.92	0.91	0.91	0.90	0.87
Total United States	1.71	1.64	1.66	1.66	1.62	1.60

== 2008–2018 ==
State federal district or territory	TFR 2008	TFR 2009	TFR 2010	TFR 2011	TFR 2012	TFR 2013	TFR 2014	TFR 2015	TFR 2016	TFR 2017	TFR 2018
Guam	2.73	2.66	3.00	2.88	3.15	2.87	2.96	2.93	3.07	2.97	2.85
American Samoa	2.91	2.86	3.11	3.10	2.85	2.61	2.60	2.55	2.69	2.59	--
South Dakota	2.35	2.28	2.27	2.25	2.27	2.27	2.27	2.27	2.26	2.23	2.15
Northern Mariana Is.	2.30	2.26	2.19	2.17	1.83	1.58	1.24	1.07	1.50	1.33	2.10
Nebraska	2.29	2.27	2.14	2.11	2.12	2.12	2.16	2.15	2.14	2.06	2.03
North Dakota	2.13	2.12	2.04	2.08	2.12	2.14	2.24	2.16	2.17	2.07	2.03
Utah	2.60	2.47	2.45	2.38	2.37	2.34	2.33	2.29	2.24	2.12	2.03
Alaska	2.41	2.27	2.35	2.28	2.19	2.22	2.19	2.17	2.14	2.02	1.97
Kansas	2.25	2.19	2.16	2.09	2.12	2.04	2.05	2.05	2.00	1.93	1.92
Idaho	2.47	2.27	2.24	2.15	2.19	2.13	2.15	2.13	2.07	2.01	1.90
Iowa	2.11	2.07	2.01	1.97	1.99	2.00	2.02	2.01	1.99	1.94	1.90
Arkansas	2.16	2.07	2.00	2.00	1.97	1.94	1.97	1.98	1.95	1.91	1.88
Oklahoma	2.21	2.15	2.11	2.04	2.04	2.04	2.03	2.00	1.98	1.90	1.88
Kentucky	2.06	2.00	1.97	1.94	1.95	1.95	1.96	1.95	1.93	1.90	1.87
Texas	2.36	2.29	2.16	2.07	2.08	2.07	2.09	2.07	2.02	1.92	1.87
Louisiana	2.08	2.02	1.95	1.91	1.92	1.93	1.96	1.96	1.93	1.88	1.86
Hawaii	2.34	2.23	2.15	2.11	2.10	2.08	2.00	1.97	1.94	1.89	1.85
Indiana	2.09	2.02	1.97	1.95	1.93	1.92	1.93	1.93	1.90	1.87	1.85
Mississippi	2.20	2.06	1.96	1.94	1.89	1.88	1.89	1.87	1.87	1.85	1.84
Minnesota	2.11	2.04	1.96	1.95	1.94	1.94	1.94	1.93	1.93	1.87	1.83
Missouri	2.05	1.96	1.94	1.92	1.89	1.88	1.87	1.86	1.86	1.81	1.82
Alabama	2.06	1.95	1.87	1.84	1.81	1.79	1.83	1.83	1.82	1.82	1.79
Ohio	1.99	1.93	1.90	1.88	1.89	1.88	1.88	1.87	1.85	1.83	1.79
U.S. Virgin Islands	2.53	2.38	2.49	2.34	2.26	2.23	2.23	2.22	1.79	--	--
Wyoming	2.28	2.14	2.04	1.98	1.99	1.99	1.99	2.01	1.93	1.86	1.79
New Jersey	2.06	2.00	1.90	1.88	1.85	1.81	1.81	1.80	1.79	1.76	1.78
Tennessee	2.07	1.95	1.88	1.87	1.87	1.85	1.87	1.85	1.82	1.80	1.78
Wisconsin	2.00	1.95	1.89	1.87	1.86	1.84	1.85	1.85	1.84	1.79	1.76
Maryland	2.03	1.95	1.89	1.85	1.83	1.79	1.82	1.80	1.79	1.75	1.75
Nevada	2.31	2.12	1.96	1.91	1.87	1.86	1.87	1.86	1.83	1.77	1.75
Georgia	2.17	2.05	1.96	1.93	1.88	1.86	1.87	1.85	1.82	1.79	1.73
Michigan	1.87	1.85	1.85	1.84	1.82	1.83	1.83	1.81	1.79	1.76	1.73
Montana	2.08	1.89	1.99	1.96	1.96	1.97	1.95	1.96	1.89	1.80	1.73
North Carolina	2.12	2.01	1.91	1.86	1.84	1.82	1.83	1.82	1.79	1.77	1.73
Virginia	2.02	1.94	1.88	1.85	1.84	1.81	1.81	1.80	1.79	1.75	1.73
Arizona	2.31	2.11	2.07	2.00	2.00	1.97	1.97	1.92	1.87	1.79	1.72
Delaware	2.11	1.99	1.94	1.90	1.85	1.79	1.79	1.81	1.78	1.75	1.72
South Carolina	2.13	1.99	1.88	1.84	1.82	1.80	1.80	1.79	1.75	1.73	1.71
West Virginia	1.90	1.86	1.83	1.84	1.85	1.86	1.81	1.78	1.74	1.73	1.71
New Mexico	2.23	2.14	2.06	2.00	1.98	1.93	1.91	1.90	1.83	1.76	1.70
Illinois	2.00	1.94	1.88	1.84	1.82	1.79	1.81	1.81	1.78	1.73	1.69
Florida	2.05	1.92	1.83	1.80	1.77	1.77	1.77	1.77	1.75	1.71	1.67
New York	1.89	1.87	1.81	1.79	1.77	1.73	1.73	1.71	1.69	1.65	1.67
Pennsylvania	1.94	1.85	1.81	1.80	1.78	1.75	1.76	1.74	1.72	1.69	1.67
Washington	2.04	1.97	1.91	1.89	1.88	1.84	1.85	1.82	1.81	1.71	1.64
California	2.15	2.05	1.95	1.90	1.89	1.84	1.84	1.79	1.77	1.69	1.63
Maine	1.74	1.72	1.70	1.67	1.68	1.67	1.66	1.64	1.64	1.58	1.58
Connecticut	1.88	1.80	1.72	1.71	1.66	1.63	1.63	1.61	1.63	1.59	1.57
Colorado	2.05	1.98	1.92	1.85	1.83	1.79	1.77	1.75	1.71	1.63	1.56
Oregon	1.95	1.84	1.79	1.76	1.74	1.73	1.72	1.70	1.65	1.56	1.49
Rhode Island	1.73	1.67	1.63	1.60	1.59	1.57	1.56	1.58	1.54	1.51	1.49
New Hampshire	1.71	1.67	1.67	1.67	1.61	1.60	1.58	1.59	1.55	1.52	1.47
Massachusetts	1.77	1.71	1.67	1.67	1.63	1.60	1.58	1.55	1.54	1.51	1.45
Vermont	1.67	1.62	1.66	1.63	1.61	1.59	1.63	1.58	1.54	1.52	1.44
District of Columbia	1.79	1.73	1.65	1.64	1.61	1.53	1.52	1.48	1.49	1.42	1.35
Puerto Rico	1.62	1.59	1.62	1.60	1.54	1.47	1.43	1.34	1.24	1.10	1.04
Total United States	2.08	2.00	1.93	1.89	1.88	1.86	1.86	1.84	1.82	1.77	1.73

Wake Island has fewer than 300 occupants, mainly related to activities of the United States Air Force, none of whom is considered a permanent resident. All other insular areas under the sovereignty of the United States are uninhabited.

== See also ==
- List of U.S. states and territories by population
- Demographics of the United States
- List of U.S. states and territories by birth and death rates
