= List of U.S. cities with large Black populations =

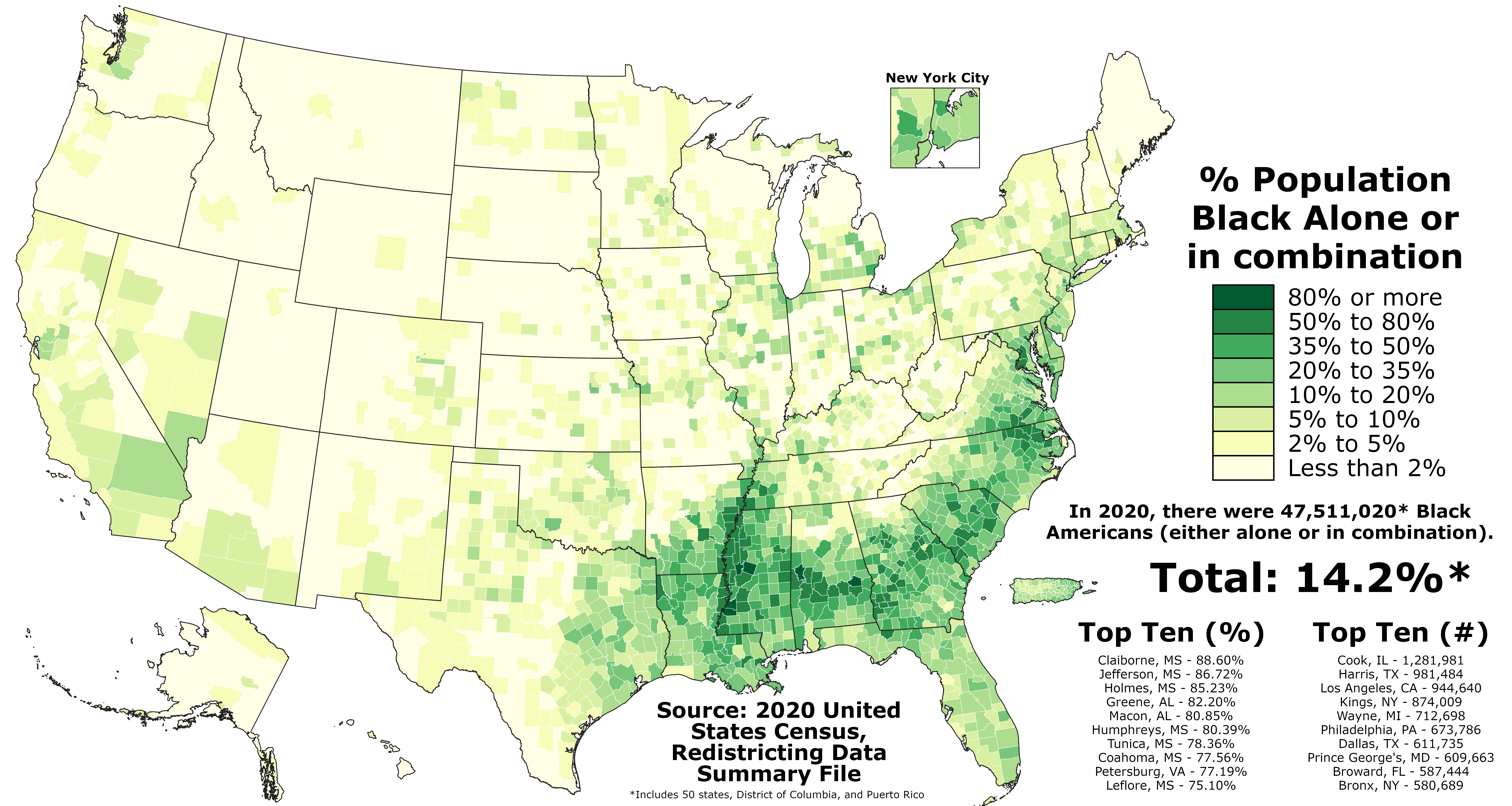
Proportion of Black Americans in each county of the fifty states, the District of Columbia, and Puerto Rico as of the 2020 United States census

This list of U.S. cities by Black population covers all incorporated cities and census-designated places with a population over 100,000 and a proportion of Black residents over 30% in the 50 U.S. states, the District of Columbia, and the territory of Puerto Rico and the population in each city that is Black or African American.

The data source for the list is the 2020 United States census.

At the time of the 2020 census, there were 47.5 million Americans who were Black (either alone or in combination), making up 14.2% of the U.S. population. State by state, the highest number of Black Americans could be found in Texas (3.96 million), Florida (3.70 million), Georgia (3.54 million), New York (3.53 million), and California (2.83 million). Meanwhile, the highest proportions of African Americans were in the District of Columbia (44.17%), Mississippi (37.94%), Louisiana (33.13%), Georgia (33.03%), and Maryland (32.01%).

Throughout the country, there are 342 cities with a population over 100,000. 19 of them had Black (alone or in combination) majorities, and in 46 more cities, between 30% and 50% of the population identified as black. Out of the 19 majority-Black cities, four were in Georgia and Louisiana, and Alabama had three each.

In 2020, the largest cities that had a Black majority were Detroit, Michigan (population 639K); Memphis, Tennessee (population 633K); Baltimore, Maryland (population 586K); New Orleans, Louisiana (population 384K); and Cleveland, Ohio (population 373K); and the city with the largest Black population was New York.

== List ==
The list below displays each city (or city-equivalent) in the fifty states, the District of Columbia, and Puerto Rico with a population over 100,000 and a Black proportion over 30% as of the 2020 census. It includes the city's total population, the number of Black people in the city, and the percentage of people in the city who are Black as of the 2020 census. The table is initially sorted by the Black proportion of each city but is sortable by any of its columns, as can be found by clicking the table headers.

Cities where people who are Black alone are not at least 30% of the population, while people who are either Black alone, or, in combination with another race, do form at least 30% of the population, are italicized. (Note: The United States Census Bureau uses the term race alone for people who answered the question on race by indicating only one race. The census uses the term race in combination for people who reported belonging to more than one race group.)

Note that New York City has the largest population of Black residents among American cities. As of the 2020 US census, New York City had 8.8 million residents, of which 22.1% identified as Black, equating to a total of 1,943,645 who identified as Black or African American. This figure is more than double the next largest city population, which is the Black population in the city of Chicago.

City	State	Black %	Black alone %	Population	Black population	Black alone population
South Fulton	Georgia	93.26%	90.53%	107,436	100,190	97,259
Jackson	Mississippi	80.45%	78.86%	153,701	123,656	121,215
Detroit	Michigan	80.38%	77.69%	639,111	513,697	496,534
Birmingham	Alabama	69.82%	68.40%	200,733	140,156	137,296
Miami Gardens	Florida	66.97%	63.50%	111,640	74,761	70,886
Memphis	Tennessee	63.34%	61.57%	633,104	401,033	389,779
Montgomery	Alabama	61.91%	60.29%	200,603	124,187	120,950
Baltimore	Maryland	60.42%	57.79%	585,708	353,890	338,478
Augusta	Georgia	58.61%	55.81%	202,081	118,441	112,773
Shreveport	Louisiana	57.82%	56.02%	187,593	108,474	105,088
New Orleans	Louisiana	57.02%	54.24%	383,997	218,969	208,273
Macon	Georgia	56.48%	54.58%	157,346	88,865	85,885
Baton Rouge	Louisiana	55.43%	53.84%	227,470	126,097	122,461
Hampton	Virginia	53.65%	49.52%	137,148	73,579	67,915
Newark	New Jersey	53.22%	49.45%	311,549	165,802	154,048
Mobile	Alabama	53.04%	51.35%	187,041	99,198	96,039
Cleveland	Ohio	51.59%	48.37%	372,624	192,239	180,224
Brockton	Massachusetts	51.42%	34.98%	105,643	54,320	36,951
Savannah	Georgia	51.41%	49.14%	147,780	75,979	72,618
Atlanta	Georgia	49.51%	47.22%	498,715	246,906	235,513
Columbus	Georgia	49.40%	46.47%	206,922	102,212	96,163
Beaumont	Texas	49.15%	47.32%	115,282	56,666	54,549
Fayetteville	North Carolina	47.58%	42.99%	208,501	99,208	89,645
Miramar	Florida	46.43%	42.39%	134,721	62,553	57,109
Newport News	Virginia	46.35%	42.25%	186,247	86,330	78,687
St. Louis	Missouri	45.45%	43.04%	301,578	137,059	129,814
Greensboro	North Carolina	44.83%	41.99%	299,035	134,071	125,574
Rochester	New York	44.55%	40.10%	211,328	94,142	84,752
Washington	District of Columbia	44.17%	41.45%	689,545	304,539	285,810
Dayton	Ohio	43.90%	40.67%	137,644	60,432	55,981
Norfolk	Virginia	43.55%	40.16%	238,005	103,657	95,594
Killeen	Texas	43.47%	37.27%	153,095	66,556	57,055
Cincinnati	Ohio	43.35%	40.55%	309,317	134,092	125,443
North Charleston	South Carolina	42.99%	40.64%	114,852	49,371	46,673
Richmond	Virginia	42.91%	40.45%	226,610	97,240	91,653
Little Rock	Arkansas	42.35%	40.64%	202,591	85,790	82,340
Hartford	Connecticut	42.32%	38.19%	121,054	51,236	46,231
Inglewood	California	42.24%	38.70%	107,762	45,523	41,708
Philadelphia	Pennsylvania	42.01%	39.31%	1,603,797	673,785	630,462
Milwaukee	Wisconsin	41.50%	38.59%	577,222	239,542	222,746
Columbia	South Carolina	40.36%	38.50%	136,632	55,140	52,598
Buffalo	New York	40.16%	36.87%	278,349	111,796	102,636
Bridgeport	Connecticut	38.59%	35.07%	148,654	57,372	52,138
Durham	North Carolina	38.59%	36.24%	283,506	109,411	102,742
Tallahassee	Florida	37.22%	35.02%	196,169	73,007	68,691
New Haven	Connecticut	35.82%	32.20%	134,023	48,001	43,160
Charlotte	North Carolina	35.39%	33.05%	874,579	309,487	289,062
Syracuse	New York	35.37%	30.67%	148,620	52,573	45,588
Winston-Salem	North Carolina	34.98%	32.52%	249,545	87,286	81,148
Akron	Ohio	34.94%	31.41%	190,469	66,555	59,821
High Point	North Carolina	34.35%	32.10%	114,059	39,183	36,610
West Palm Beach	Florida	34.13%	31.65%	117,415	40,075	37,160
Jacksonville	Florida	33.20%	30.57%	949,611	315,281	290,279
Toledo	Ohio	32.67%	28.76%	270,871	88,503	77,897
Lafayette	Louisiana	32.42%	30.70%	121,374	39,354	37,259
Columbus	Ohio	31.77%	28.65%	905,748	287,735	259,483
Chesapeake	Virginia	31.68%	28.97%	249,422	79,013	72,268
Huntsville	Alabama	31.45%	29.34%	215,006	67,626	63,085
Columbia	Maryland	31.25%	27.65%	104,681	32,718	28,941
Peoria	Illinois	31.13%	27.86%	113,150	35,228	31,527
Chattanooga	Tennessee	30.89%	29.09%	181,099	55,950	52,690
Chicago	Illinois	30.79%	29.17%	2,746,388	845,638	801,195
Roanoke	Virginia	30.76%	27.47%	100,011	30,764	27,470
Pompano Beach	Florida	30.71%	28.55%	112,046	34,410	31,994
Indianapolis	Indiana	30.55%	27.95%	887,642	271,214	248,067

== New Great Migration ==
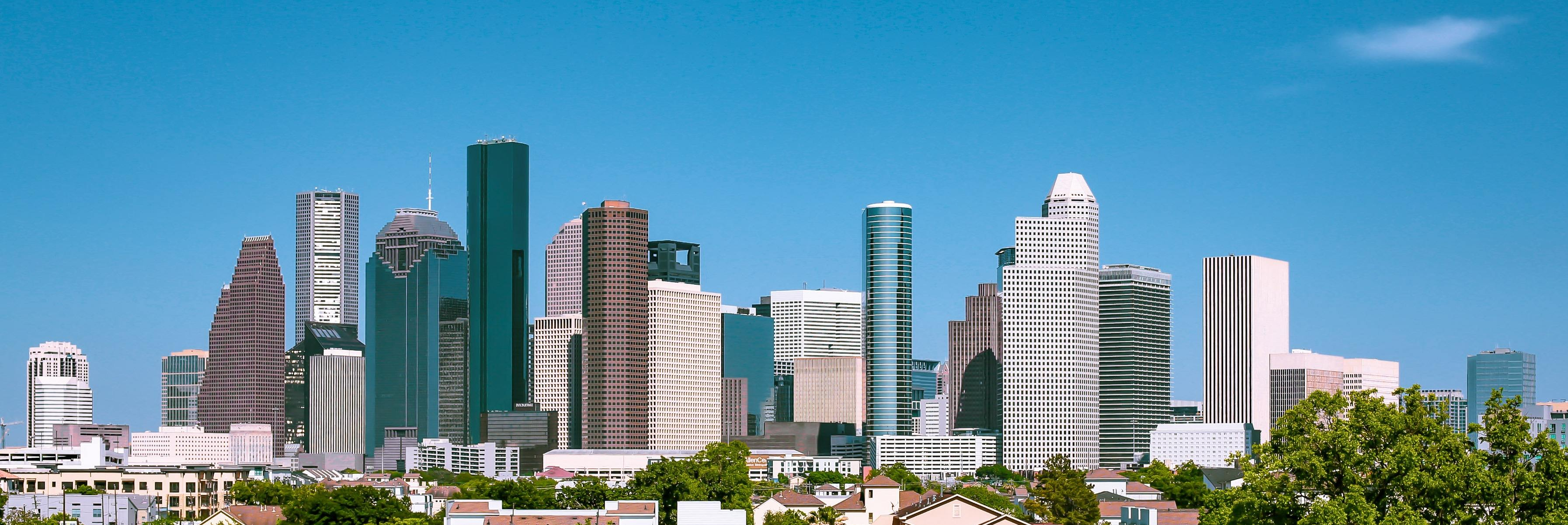
Houston has one of the fastest growing black populations in the United States.

The New Great Migration is the demographic change from 1970 to the present, which is a reversal of the previous 60-year trend of black migration within the United States.

Since 1970, deindustrialization of cities in the Northeastern and Midwestern United States, growth of jobs in the "New South" with lower costs of living, desire to reunite with family, cultural ties, the perception of lessening discrimination and religious connections have all acted to attract African Americans to the Southern United States in substantial numbers. Between 1965 and 1970 around 287,000 African Americans left the Southern United States, while from 1975 to 1980, it is estimated 109,000 African Americans migrated to the Southern United States, showing the reversal of the original Great Migration. Between 1975 and 1980, several Southern states saw net African American migration gains. In 2014, African American millennials moved in the highest numbers to Texas, Georgia, Florida, and North Carolina. African American populations have continued to drop throughout much of the Northeast, especially from the state of New York and from northern New Jersey, as they rise in the South. In Massachusetts, even though the black population saw a net increase between 2010 and 2020, the Greater Boston area lost approximately 8,800 black residents and Massachusetts lost an average of 11,700 black residents per year from 2015 to 2020, with approximately half moving to Southern states and Georgia and Florida being the most popular destinations.

African Americans are also moving to the suburbs.

Fort Worth, San Antonio, Columbus, Houston, Jacksonville and Charlotte saw the largest growth in the black population.

== See also ==
- African Americans
  - List of U.S. states by African-American population
  - List of U.S. counties with African-American majority populations
  - List of U.S. metropolitan areas with large African-American populations
  - List of U.S. communities with African American majority populations
  - List of African American neighborhoods
  - African Americans in Atlanta
  - African Americans in New York City
  - History of African Americans
    - History of African Americans in Baltimore
    - History of African Americans in Boston
    - History of African Americans in Chicago
    - History of African Americans in Dallas-Ft. Worth
    - History of African Americans in Detroit
    - History of African Americans in Houston
    - History of African Americans in Jacksonville
    - History of African Americans in Los Angeles
    - History of African Americans in Philadelphia
    - History of African Americans in San Antonio
    - History of African Americans in Austin
- List of U.S. cities with large Hispanic populations
- Demographics of the United States
- Lists of U.S. cities with large ethnic population
