= List of U.S. states and territories by birth and death rates =

This article includes a list of U.S. states sorted by birth and death rate, expressed per 1,000 inhabitants, for 2021, using the most recent data available from the U.S. National Center for Health Statistics.

== 2021 list ==
Birth rates per 1,000 people in 2021 13+ 12–12.9 11–11.9 10–10.9 9–9.9 8–8.9

Death rates per 1,000 people in 2021 13+ 12–12.9 11–11.9 10–10.9 9–9.9 8–8.9 6–6.9

List of U.S. states and territories by birth and death rates in 2021
2021 rank	State	Birth rate (per 1,000 people)	Death rate (per 1,000 people)	Rate of natural increase (per 1,000 people)
1	Guam	15.5	7.6	7.9
2	American Samoa	-	-	-
3	Utah	14.0	6.8	7.2
4	Northern Marianas	11.0	5.1	5.9
5	Alaska	12.8	8.5	4.3
6	District of Columbia	12.9	8.7	4.2
7	North Dakota	13.0	9.4	3.6
8	Texas	12.7	9.1	3.6
9	Nebraska	12.5	9.6	2.9
10	Colorado	10.8	8.3	2.5
11	South Dakota	12.7	10.3	2.4
12	Minnesota	11.3	9.0	2.3
13	California	10.7	8.5	2.2
14	Idaho	11.8	9.7	2.1
15	New Jersey	11.0	9.1	1.9
16	Washington	10.8	8.9	1.9
17	Hawaii	10.8	8.9	1.9
18	Maryland	11.1	9.4	1.7
19	New York	10.6	9.1	1.5
20	Virginia	11.1	9.9	1.2
21	Georgia	11.5	10.4	1.1
22	Kansas	11.8	10.9	0.9
23	Massachusetts	9.9	9.0	0.9
24	Iowa	11.5	10.7	0.8
25	Illinois	10.4	9.9	0.5
26	Connecticut	9.9	9.5	0.4
27	Indiana	11.7	11.5	0.2
28	North Carolina	11.4	11.2	0.2
29	Nevada	10.7	10.5	0.2
30	Wisconsin	10.5	10.3	0.2
31	Louisiana	12.4	12.4	−0.0
32	Arizona	10.7	11.2	−0.5
33	Wyoming	10.8	11.4	−0.6
34	Oklahoma	12.1	12.8	−0.7
35	Missouri	11.3	12.0	−0.7
36	Rhode Island	9.6	10.3	−0.7
37	Delaware	10.4	11.3	−0.9
38	Oregon	9.6	10.6	−1.0
39	New Hampshire	9.1	10.2	−1.1
40	Arkansas	11.9	13.2	−1.3
41	Michigan	10.4	11.7	−1.3
42	Montana	10.2	11.5	−1.3
43	Tennessee	11.7	13.1	−1.4
44	Ohio	11.0	12.5	−1.5
45	South Carolina	11.0	12.6	−1.6
46	Kentucky	11.6	13.4	−1.8
47	Pennsylvania	10.2	12.0	−1.8
48	New Mexico	10.1	12.0	−1.9
49	Mississippi	11.9	13.9	−2.0
50	Florida	9.9	12.0	−2.1
51	Alabama	11.5	13.7	−2.2
52	Vermont	8.3	10.7	−2.4
53	Maine	8.7	12.6	−3.9
54	Puerto Rico	5.9	10.1	−4.2
55	West Virginia	9.6	16.5	−6.9
—	United States	11.0	10.5	0.5

== See also ==
- List of U.S. states and territories by fertility rate
