= List of U.S. states and territories by African-American population =

Proportion of African Americans in each U.S. state, the District of Columbia, and Puerto Rico as of the 2020 United States Census

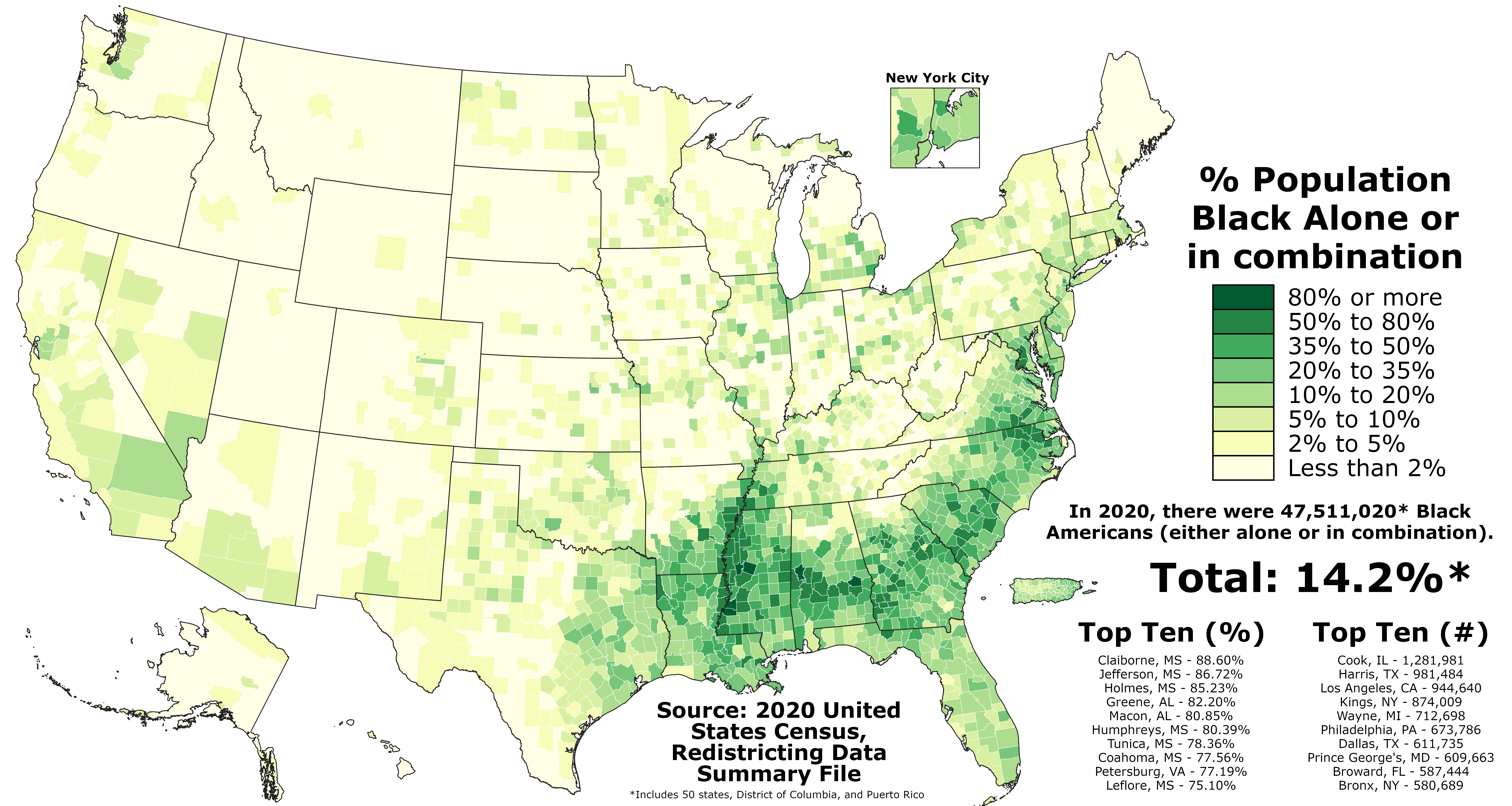
Proportion of black Americans in each county of the fifty states, the District of Columbia and Puerto Rico as of the 2020 United States Census

The following is a list of U.S. states, territories and the District of Columbia ranked by the proportion of African Americans of full or partial descent, including those of Hispanic origin, in the population. Considering only those who marked "black" and no other race in combination, as in the first table, the percentage was 12.4% in 2020, down from 12.6% in 2010. While those who selected black and any other race in combination was 14.2%.

== 2020 census (single race) ==
Rank	State or territory	% Black or African American alone or in combination	Black or African American alone or in combination Population (2020)
1	(United States Virgin Islands) Virgin Islands (U.S.)	76.0%	80,908
2	District of Columbia	41.41%	285,810
3	Mississippi	37.94%	1,084,481
4	Louisiana	33.13%	1,464,023
5	(Georgia (U.S. state)) Georgia	33.03%	3,320,513
6	Maryland	32.01%	1,820,472
7	Alabama	29.80%	1,296,162
8	South Carolina	27.09%	1,280,531
9	North Carolina	23.50%	2,140,217
10	Delaware	22.11%	218,899
11	Virginia	21.60%	1,607,581
12	Tennessee	19.80%	1,092,948
13	Puerto Rico	17.46%	328,711
14	Florida	17.11%	3,246,381
15	Arkansas	17.10%	453,783
16	(New York (state)) New York	16.89%	2,986,172
17	Illinois	16.19%	1,808,271
18	Michigan	15.76%	1,376,579
19	New Jersey	15.19%	1,219,770
−	United States of America	14.20%	47,511,020
20	Ohio	12.58%	1,478,781
21	Texas	12.21%	3,552,997
22	Missouri	11.40%	699,840
23	Pennsylvania	11.30%	1,423,169
24	Connecticut	10.88%	388,675
25	Nevada	10.80%	304,739
26	Indiana	10.60%	648,513
27	Kentucky	8.09%	362,417
28	Oklahoma	7.39%	289,961
29	Massachusetts	7.09%	494,029
30	Minnesota	7.08%	398,434
31	Wisconsin	6.40%	376,256
32	California	6.30%	2,237,044
33	Kansas	5.79%	168,809
34	Rhode Island	5.78%	62,168
35	Nebraska	5.77%	96,535
36	Arizona	5.76%	339,150
37	Colorado	5.19%	234,828
38	Iowa	5.14%	131,972
39	(Washington (state)) Washington	5.09%	407,565
40	North Dakota	3.9%	26,783
41	West Virginia	3.76%	65,813
42	Alaska	3.70%	21,898
43	New Mexico	2.28%	55,904
44	Oregon	2.26%	182,655
45	South Dakota	2.24%	17,842
46	Maine	1.90%	25,752
47	Hawaii	1.60%	23,417
48	New Hampshire	1.50%	20,127
49	Vermont	1.40%	9,034
50	Utah	1.20%	40,058
51	Guam	1.0%	1,540
52	Idaho	0.99%	15,726
53	Wyoming	0.91%	5,232
54	Montana	0.50%	5,484
55	Northern Mariana Islands	0.1%	55
56	American Samoa	0.02%	13

== African-American proportion of state and territory populations (1790–2020) ==
From 1787 to 1868, enslaved African Americans were counted in the U.S. census under the Three-fifths Compromise. The compromise was an agreement reached during the 1787 United States Constitutional Convention over the counting of slaves in determining a state's total population. This count would determine the number of seats for each state in the U.S. House of Representatives and, should direct taxation be imposed by Congress (which was never done under Article I, section 2, clause 3 of the Constitution), how much each state would pay in taxes. The compromise counted three-fifths of each state's slave population toward that state's total population for the purpose of apportioning the U.S. House of Representatives. Even though slaves were denied voting rights, this gave Southern states more U.S. representatives and more presidential electoral votes than if slaves had not been counted. Free blacks and indentured servants were not affected by the proviso, and each was counted as one full person for representation.

African-American % of Population (1790–1990) Black or African American alone or in combination (2000–2020) by U.S. state and territory
State/Territory	1790	1800	1810	1820	1830	1840	1850	1860	1870	1880	1890	1900	1910	1920	1930	1940	1950	1960	1970	1980	1990	2000	2010	2020
United States of America	19.3%	18.9%	19.0%	18.4%	18.1%	16.8%	15.7%	14.1%	12.7%	13.1%	11.9%	11.6%	10.7%	9.9%	9.7%	9.8%	10.0%	10.5%	11.1%	11.7%	12.1%	12.9%	13.6%	14.2%
Alabama		41.4%	29.0%	33.2%	38.5%	43.3%	44.7%	45.4%	47.7%	47.5%	44.8%	45.2%	42.5%	38.4%	35.7%	34.7%	32.0%	30.0%	26.2%	25.6%	25.3%	26.0%	26.3%	26.8%
Alaska												0.3%	0.3%	0.2%	0.2%	0.2%		3.0%	3.0%	3.4%	4.1%	4.3%	4.7%	4.8%
American Samoa																					0.02%	0.04%	0.02%	
Arizona								0.3%	0.3%	0.4%	1.5%	1.5%	1.0%	2.4%	2.5%	3.0%	3.5%	3.3%	3.0%	2.8%	3.0%	3.6%	5.0%	6.2%
Arkansas			13.0%	11.7%	15.5%	20.9%	22.7%	25.6%	25.2%	26.3%	27.4%	28.0%	28.1%	27.0%	25.8%	24.8%	22.3%	21.8%	18.3%	16.3%	15.9%	16.0%	16.1%	16.5%
California							1.0%	1.1%	0.8%	0.7%	0.9%	0.7%	0.9%	1.1%	1.4%	1.8%	4.4%	5.6%	7.0%	7.7%	7.4%	7.4%	7.2%	7.1%
Colorado								0.1%	1.1%	1.3%	1.5%	1.6%	1.4%	1.2%	1.1%	1.1%	1.5%	2.3%	3.0%	3.5%	4.0%	4.4%	5.0%	5.5%
Connecticut	2.3%	2.5%	2.6%	2.9%	2.7%	2.6%	2.1%	1.9%	1.8%	1.9%	1.6%	1.7%	1.4%	1.5%	1.8%	1.9%	2.7%	4.2%	6.0%	7.0%	8.3%	10.0%	11.3%	13.0%
Delaware	21.6%	22.4%	23.8%	24.0%	24.9%	25.0%	22.2%	19.3%	18.2%	18.0%	16.8%	16.6%	15.4%	13.6%	13.7%	13.5%	13.7%	13.6%	14.3%	16.1%	16.9%	20.1%	22.9%	24.7%
(Washington, D.C.) District of Columbia		30.4%	33.1%	31.2%	30.1%	29.1%	26.6%	19.1%	33.0%	33.6%	32.8%	31.1%	28.5%	25.1%	27.1%	28.2%	35.0%	53.9%	71.1%	70.3%	65.8%	61.3%	52.2%	44.2%
Florida					47.1%	48.7%	46.0%	44.6%	48.8%	47.0%	42.5%	43.7%	41.0%	34.0%	29.4%	27.1%	21.8%	17.8%	15.3%	13.8%	13.6%	15.5%	17.0%	17.2%
(Georgia (U.S. state)) Georgia	35.9%	37.1%	42.5%	44.4%	42.6%	41.0%	42.4%	44.0%	46.0%	47.0%	46.7%	46.7%	45.1%	41.7%	36.8%	34.7%	30.9%	28.5%	25.9%	26.8%	27.0%	29.2%	31.5%	33.0%
Guam																					2.37%	1.02%	0.96%	
Hawaii												0.2%	0.4%	0.1%	0.2%	0.1%	0.5%	0.8%	1.0%	1.8%	2.5%	2.8%	2.9%	3.2%
Idaho									0.4%	0.2%	0.2%	0.2%	0.2%	0.2%	0.2%	0.1%	0.2%	0.2%	0.3%	0.3%	0.3%	0.6%	1.0%	1.5%
Illinois		7.4%	6.4%	2.5%	1.5%	0.8%	0.6%	0.4%	1.1%	1.5%	1.5%	1.8%	1.9%	2.8%	4.3%	4.9%	7.4%	10.3%	12.8%	14.7%	14.8%	15.6%	15.4%	15.5%
Indiana		4.4%	2.6%	1.0%	1.1%	1.0%	1.1%	0.8%	1.5%	2.0%	2.1%	2.3%	2.2%	2.8%	3.5%	3.6%	4.4%	5.8%	6.9%	7.6%	7.8%	8.8%	10.1%	11.2%
Iowa						0.4%	0.2%	0.2%	0.5%	0.6%	0.6%	0.6%	0.7%	0.8%	0.7%	0.7%	0.8%	0.9%	1.2%	1.4%	1.7%	2.5%	3.7%	5.4%
Kansas								0.6%	4.7%	4.3%	3.5%	3.5%	3.2%	3.3%	3.5%	3.6%	3.8%	4.2%	4.8%	5.3%	5.8%	6.3%	7.1%	7.6%
Kentucky	17.0%	18.6%	20.2%	22.9%	24.7%	24.3%	22.5%	20.4%	16.8%	16.5%	14.4%	13.3%	11.4%	9.8%	8.6%	7.5%	6.9%	7.1%	7.2%	7.1%	7.1%	7.7%	8.7%	9.7%
Louisiana			55.2%	51.8%	58.5%	55.0%	50.7%	49.5%	50.1%	51.5%	50.0%	47.1%	43.1%	38.9%	36.9%	35.9%	32.9%	31.9%	29.8%	29.4%	30.8%	32.9%	32.8%	33.1%
Maine	0.6%	0.5%	0.4%	0.3%	0.3%	0.3%	0.2%	0.2%	0.3%	0.2%	0.2%	0.2%	0.2%	0.2%	0.1%	0.2%	0.1%	0.3%	0.3%	0.3%	0.4%	0.7%	1.6%	2.7%
Maryland	34.7%	36.7%	38.2%	36.1%	34.9%	32.3%	28.3%	24.9%	22.5%	22.5%	20.7%	19.8%	17.9%	16.9%	16.9%	16.6%	16.5%	16.7%	17.8%	22.7%	24.9%	28.8%	30.9%	32.0%
Massachusetts	1.4%	1.5%	1.4%	1.3%	1.2%	1.2%	0.9%	0.8%	1.0%	1.0%	1.0%	1.1%	1.1%	1.2%	1.2%	1.3%	1.6%	2.2%	3.1%	3.9%	5.0%	6.3%	7.8%	9.5%
Michigan		3.7%	3.0%	2.1%	0.8%	0.3%	0.6%	0.9%	1.0%	0.9%	0.7%	0.7%	0.6%	1.6%	3.5%	4.0%	6.9%	9.2%	11.2%	12.9%	13.9%	14.8%	15.2%	15.3%
Minnesota							0.6%	0.2%	0.2%	0.2%	0.3%	0.3%	0.3%	0.4%	0.4%	0.4%	0.5%	0.7%	0.9%	1.3%	2.2%	4.1%	6.2%	8.5%
Mississippi		41.5%	47.0%	44.1%	48.4%	52.3%	51.2%	55.3%	53.7%	57.5%	57.6%	58.5%	56.2%	52.2%	50.2%	49.2%	45.3%	42.0%	36.8%	35.2%	35.6%	36.6%	37.6%	37.9%
Missouri			17.6%	15.9%	18.3%	15.6%	13.2%	10.0%	6.9%	6.7%	5.6%	5.2%	4.8%	5.2%	6.2%	6.5%	7.5%	9.0%	10.3%	10.5%	10.7%	11.7%	12.5%	13.0%
Montana									0.9%	0.9%	1.0%	0.6%	0.2%	0.3%	0.2%	0.2%	0.2%	0.2%	0.3%	0.2%	0.3%	0.5%	0.8%	1.2%
Nebraska								0.3%	0.6%	0.5%	0.8%	0.6%	0.6%	1.0%	1.0%	1.1%	1.5%	2.1%	2.7%	3.1%	3.6%	4.4%	5.4%	6.4%
Nevada								0.7%	0.8%	0.8%	0.5%	0.3%	0.6%	0.4%	0.6%	0.6%	2.7%	4.7%	5.7%	6.4%	6.6%	7.5%	9.4%	12.1%
New Hampshire	0.6%	0.5%	0.5%	0.3%	0.2%	0.2%	0.2%	0.2%	0.2%	0.2%	0.2%	0.2%	0.1%	0.1%	0.2%	0.1%	0.1%	0.3%	0.3%	0.4%	0.6%	1.0%	1.7%	2.4%
New Jersey	7.7%	8.0%	7.6%	7.2%	6.4%	5.8%	4.9%	3.8%	3.4%	3.4%	3.3%	3.7%	3.5%	3.7%	5.2%	5.5%	6.6%	8.5%	10.7%	12.6%	13.4%	14.4%	14.8%	15.2%
New Mexico							0.0%	0.1%	0.2%	0.8%	1.2%	0.8%	0.5%	1.6%	0.7%	0.9%	1.2%	1.8%	1.9%	1.8%	2.0%	2.3%	2.8%	3.2%
(New York (state)) New York	7.6%	5.3%	4.2%	2.9%	2.3%	2.1%	1.6%	1.3%	1.2%	1.3%	1.2%	1.4%	1.5%	1.9%	3.3%	4.2%	6.2%	8.4%	11.9%	13.7%	15.9%	17.0%	17.2%	17.5%
North Carolina	26.8%	29.4%	32.2%	34.4%	35.9%	35.6%	36.4%	36.4%	36.6%	38.0%	34.7%	33.0%	31.6%	29.8%	29.0%	27.5%	25.8%	24.5%	22.2%	22.4%	22.0%	22.1%	22.6%	22.5%
North Dakota									1.0%	0.3%	0.2%	0.1%	0.1%	0.1%	0.1%	0.0%	0.0%	0.1%	0.4%	0.4%	0.6%	0.8%	1.6%	4.4%
Northern Mariana Islands																					0.06%	0.06%	0.1%	
Ohio		0.5%	0.8%	0.8%	1.0%	1.1%	1.3%	1.6%	2.4%	2.5%	2.4%	2.3%	2.3%	3.2%	4.7%	4.9%	6.5%	8.1%	9.1%	10.0%	10.6%	12.1%	13.4%	14.4%
Oklahoma											8.4%	7.0%	8.3%	7.4%	7.2%	7.2%	6.5%	6.6%	6.7%	6.8%	7.4%	8.3%	8.7%	9.7%
Oregon							0.5%	0.2%	0.4%	0.3%	0.4%	0.3%	0.2%	0.3%	0.2%	0.2%	0.8%	1.0%	1.3%	1.4%	1.6%	2.1%	2.6%	3.2%
Pennsylvania	2.4%	2.7%	2.9%	2.9%	2.8%	2.8%	2.3%	2.0%	1.9%	2.0%	2.0%	2.5%	2.5%	3.3%	4.5%	4.7%	6.1%	7.5%	8.6%	8.8%	9.2%	10.5%	11.9%	12.7%
Puerto Rico																						10.9%	14.8%	17.5%
Rhode Island	6.3%	5.3%	4.8%	4.3%	3.7%	3.0%	2.5%	2.3%	2.3%	2.3%	2.1%	2.1%	1.8%	1.7%	1.4%	1.5%	1.8%	2.1%	2.7%	2.9%	3.9%	5.5%	7.4%	9.1%
South Carolina	43.7%	43.2%	48.4%	52.8%	55.6%	56.4%	58.9%	58.6%	58.9%	60.7%	59.8%	58.4%	55.2%	51.4%	45.6%	42.9%	38.8%	34.8%	30.5%	30.4%	29.8%	29.9%	28.8%	26.8%
South Dakota								0.0%	0.6%	0.3%	0.2%	0.1%	0.1%	0.1%	0.1%	0.1%	0.1%	0.2%	0.2%	0.3%	0.5%	0.9%	1.8%	3.0%
Tennessee	10.6%	13.2%	17.5%	19.6%	21.4%	22.7%	24.5%	25.5%	25.6%	26.1%	24.4%	23.8%	21.7%	19.3%	18.3%	17.4%	16.1%	16.5%	15.8%	15.8%	16.0%	16.8%	17.4%	17.3%
Texas							27.5%	30.3%	31.0%	24.7%	21.8%	20.4%	17.7%	15.9%	14.7%	14.4%	12.7%	12.4%	12.5%	12.0%	11.9%	12.0%	12.6%	13.6%
Utah							0.4%	0.1%	0.1%	0.2%	0.3%	0.2%	0.3%	0.3%	0.2%	0.2%	0.4%	0.5%	0.6%	0.6%	0.7%	1.1%	1.6%	2.1%
Vermont	0.3%	0.4%	0.3%	0.4%	0.3%	0.3%	0.2%	0.2%	0.3%	0.3%	0.3%	0.2%	0.5%	0.2%	0.2%	0.1%	0.1%	0.1%	0.2%	0.2%	0.3%	0.7%	1.5%	2.2%
(United States Virgin Islands) Virgin Islands (U.S.)														N/A^{[a]}	N/A^{[b]}	N/A^{[c]}	N/A^{[d]}	N/A^{[e]}	N/A^{[f]}	N/A^{[g]}	76.62%	76.19%	76.03%	71.04% ^{[h]}
Virginia	43.4%	44.6%	47.1%	47.8%	47.9%	46.9%	45.0%	43.3%	41.9%	41.8%	38.4%	35.6%	32.6%	29.9%	26.8%	24.7%	22.1%	20.6%	18.5%	18.9%	18.8%	20.4%	20.7%	20.9%
(Washington (state)) Washington								0.3%	0.9%	0.4%	0.4%	0.5%	0.5%	0.5%	0.4%	0.4%	1.3%	1.7%	2.1%	2.6%	3.1%	4.4%	4.8%	5.8%
West Virginia	9.5%	9.8%	11.5%	12.1%	11.2%	9.6%	7.8%	5.6%	4.1%	4.2%	4.3%	4.5%	5.3%	5.9%	6.6%	6.2%	5.7%	4.8%	3.9%	3.3%	3.1%	3.5%	4.2%	5.0%
Wisconsin				1.2%	1.8%	0.6%	0.2%	0.2%	0.2%	0.2%	0.1%	0.1%	0.1%	0.2%	0.4%	0.4%	0.8%	1.9%	2.9%	3.9%	5.0%	6.1%	7.1%	7.7%
Wyoming									2.0%	1.4%	1.5%	1.0%	1.5%	0.7%	0.6%	0.4%	0.9%	0.7%	0.8%	0.7%	0.8%	1.0%	1.3%	1.7%

aIt is a % of 26,051; The 1920 census has the population but not the percentage of Black people in the Virgin Islands but based on the percentage values known the percentage had to be higher than 76.6%

bIt is a % of 22,012; The 1930 census has the population but not the percentage of Black people in the Virgin Islands but based on the percentage values known the percentage had to be higher than 76.6%

cIt is a % of 24,880; The 1940 census has the population but not the percentage of Black people in the Virgin Islands but based on the percentage values known the percentage had to be higher than 76.6%

dIt is a % of 26,665; The 1950 census has the population but not the percentage of Black people in the Virgin Islands but based on the percentage values known the percentage had to be higher than 76.6%

eIt is a % of 32,099; The 1960 census has the population but not the percentage of Black people in the Virgin Islands but based on the percentage values known the percentage had to be higher than 76.6%

fIt is a % of 63,200; The 1970 census has the population but not the percentage of Black people in the Virgin Islands but based on the percentage values known the percentage had to be higher than 76.6%

gIt is a % of 95,591; The 1980 census has the population but not the percentage of Black people in the Virgin Islands but based on the percentage values known the percentage had to be higher than 76.6%

h % is from 62,183

=== Free blacks as a percentage out of the total black population by U.S. region and U.S. state between 1790 and 1860 ===
In 1865, all enslaved blacks (African Americans) in the United States were emancipated as a result of the Thirteenth Amendment. However, some U.S. states had previously emancipated some or all of their black population. The table below shows the percentage of free blacks as a percentage of the total black population in various U.S. regions and U.S. states between 1790 and 1860 (the blank areas on the chart below mean that there is no data for those specific regions or states in those specific years).

Free blacks as a percentage of the total black (African-American) population by U.S. region and U.S. state between 1790 and 1860
State/territory	1790	1800	1810	1820	1830	1840	1850	1860
United States	7.9%	10.8%	13.5%	13.2%	13.7%	13.4%	11.9%	11.0%
Northeast	40.1%	56.2%	73.5%	83.7%	97.8%	99.5%	99.8%	100.0%
Midwest		78.7%	52.4%	38.0%	37.7%	34.4%	35.5%	37.6%
South	4.7%	6.7%	8.5%	8.2%	8.4%	8.1%	7.0%	6.3%
West							97.9%	99.4%
Alabama		4.4%	2.2%	1.3%	1.3%	0.8%	0.7%	0.6%
Alaska								
Arizona								100.0%
Arkansas			1.4%	3.5%	3.0%	2.3%	1.3%	0.1%
California							100.0%	100.0%
Colorado								100.0%
Connecticut	50.4%	84.9%	95.4%	98.8%	99.7%	99.8%	100.0%	100.0%
Delaware	30.5%	57.3%	75.9%	74.2%	82.8%	86.7%	88.8%	91.7%
District of Columbia		16.2%	30.7%	37.9%	50.5%	66.2%	73.2%	77.8%
Florida					5.2%	3.1%	2.3%	1.5%
Georgia	1.3%	1.7%	1.7%	1.2%	1.1%	1.0%	0.8%	0.8%
Hawaii								
Idaho								
Illinois		41.5%	78.5%	33.3%	68.7%	91.6%	100.0%	100.0%
Indiana		75.7%	62.4%	86.6%	99.9%	100.0%	100.0%	100.0%
Iowa						91.5%	100.0%	100.0%
Kansas								99.7%
Kentucky	0.9%	1.8%	2.1%	2.1%	2.9%	3.9%	4.5%	4.5%
Louisiana			18.0%	13.2%	13.2%	13.1%	6.7%	5.3%
Maine	100.0%	100.0%	100.0%	100.0%	99.8%	100.0%	100.0%	100.0%
Maryland	7.2%	15.6%	23.3%	27.0%	33.9%	40.9%	45.3%	49.1%
Massachusetts	100.0%	100.0%	100.0%	100.0%	100.0%	100.0%	100.0%	100.0%
Michigan		100.0%	83.3%	100.0%	99.6%	100.0%	100.0%	100.0%
Minnesota							100.0%	100.0%
Mississippi		5.0%	1.2%	1.4%	0.8%	0.7%	0.3%	0.2%
Missouri			17.4%	3.3%	2.2%	2.6%	2.9%	3.0%
Montana								
Nebraska								81.7%
Nevada								100.0%
New Hampshire	79.9%	100.0%	100.0%	100.0%	99.5%	99.8%	100.0%	100.0%
New Jersey	19.5%	26.2%	42.0%	62.2%	89.0%	96.9%	99.0%	99.9%
New Mexico							100.0%	100.0%
New York	17.9%	33.3%	62.8%	74.4%	99.8%	100.0%	100.0%	100.0%
North Carolina	4.7%	5.0%	5.7%	6.7%	7.4%	8.5%	8.7%	8.4%
North Dakota								
Ohio		100.0%	100.0%	100.0%	99.9%	100.0%	100.0%	100.0%
Oklahoma								
Oregon							100.0%	100.0%
Pennsylvania	63.6%	89.5%	96.6%	99.3%	98.9%	99.9%	100.0%	100.0%
Rhode Island	78.2%	89.7%	97.1%	98.7%	99.5%	99.8%	100.0%	100.0%
South Carolina	1.7%	2.1%	2.3%	2.6%	2.4%	2.5%	2.3%	2.4%
South Dakota								N/A^{[a]}
Tennessee	9.6%	2.2%	2.9%	3.3%	3.1%	2.9%	2.6%	2.6%
Texas							0.7%	0.2%
Utah							48.0%	50.8%
Vermont	100.0%	100.0%	100.0%	100.0%	100.0%	100.0%	100.0%	100.0%
Virginia	4.1%	5.6%	7.3%	8.2%	9.3%	10.1%	10.2%	10.5%
Washington							100.0%	100.0%
West Virginia	11.6%	6.8%	10.5%	8.5%	10.9%	14.1%	13.1%	13.1%
Wisconsin				100.0%	51.6%	94.4%	100.0%	100.0%
Wyoming								

a No blacks, whether free or enslaved, were reported as living in South Dakota in 1860.

== See also ==
- African-American neighborhoods
- List of African-American neighborhoods
- List of U.S. cities with large African-American populations
- List of U.S. counties with African-American majority populations
- List of U.S. metropolitan areas with large African-American populations
- Black Southerners
