= List of U.S. states by vehicles per capita =

This is a list of U.S. states by vehicles per capita. Vehicle data are from the Bureau of Transportation Statistics and population data are from the US Census.

Data are for the year 2021.

| State | Vehicles | Vehicles / person | Miles / vehicle | Mpg |
|---|---|---|---|---|
| United States | 282,366,285 | 0.850 | 11,121 | 24.4 |
| Montana | 2,140,014 | 1.934 | 6,300 | 26.7 |
| South Dakota | 1,433,044 | 1.599 | 6,974 | 21.4 |
| Wyoming | 870,969 | 1.503 | 12,741 | 37.7 |
| Iowa | 3,839,312 | 1.201 | 8,605 | 22.5 |
| North Dakota | 925,186 | 1.189 | 10,004 | 24.1 |
| Arkansas | 3,555,142 | 1.174 | 10,809 | 27.1 |
| Alabama | 5,463,966 | 1.082 | 14,562 | 25.9 |
| Idaho | 1,976,199 | 1.038 | 9,770 | 25.4 |
| Washington | 7,966,147 | 1.029 | 7,255 | 23.9 |
| New Hampshire | 1,417,949 | 1.022 | 9,260 | 21.2 |
| Maine | 1,387,656 | 1.006 | 10,493 | 24.3 |
| Nebraska | 1,933,528 | 0.984 | 10,970 | 24.9 |
| Wisconsin | 5,769,058 | 0.981 | 11,264 | 27.7 |
| South Carolina | 5,091,679 | 0.980 | 11,291 | 22.4 |
| Kentucky | 4,408,730 | 0.978 | 10,913 | 23.2 |
| Minnesota | 5,511,960 | 0.964 | 10,372 | 26.0 |
| Tennessee | 6,712,722 | 0.964 | 12,304 | 25.6 |
| Michigan | 9,556,452 | 0.952 | 10,123 | 23.8 |
| Vermont | 614,340 | 0.949 | 10,784 | 25.2 |
| Oregon | 4,010,635 | 0.942 | 9,186 | 26.0 |
| Alaska | 686,142 | 0.934 | 8,383 | 24.6 |
| Ohio | 10,892,377 | 0.926 | 10,367 | 25.3 |
| Indiana | 6,241,291 | 0.916 | 12,600 | 26.5 |
| Missouri | 5,603,939 | 0.908 | 14,238 | 26.6 |
| Kansas | 2,606,313 | 0.887 | 12,160 | 26.3 |
| Virginia | 7,652,036 | 0.884 | 10,468 | 21.0 |
| New Mexico | 1,862,673 | 0.880 | 14,400 | 27.5 |
| Florida | 19,180,165 | 0.879 | 11,343 | 26.4 |
| Colorado | 5,096,394 | 0.877 | 10,564 | 25.0 |
| Illinois | 11,003,729 | 0.867 | 8,863 | 24.4 |
| Hawaii | 1,246,765 | 0.862 | 7,998 | 25.7 |
| Nevada | 2,676,143 | 0.850 | 10,118 | 24.1 |
| Utah | 2,838,505 | 0.850 | 11,851 | 28.8 |
| Georgia | 9,142,656 | 0.847 | 13,200 | 26.6 |
| Oklahoma | 3,353,167 | 0.840 | 13,349 | 25.3 |
| Pennsylvania | 10,927,881 | 0.840 | 9,397 | 23.7 |
| Louisiana | 3,862,490 | 0.835 | 14,169 | 26.7 |
| Arizona | 6,064,542 | 0.834 | 12,163 | 26.4 |
| North Carolina | 8,707,506 | 0.824 | 13,521 | 25.7 |
| Mississippi | 2,385,768 | 0.809 | 17,124 | 24.6 |
| California | 31,349,073 | 0.801 | 9,915 | 24.3 |
| Maryland | 4,910,674 | 0.795 | 11,526 | 23.9 |
| Texas | 23,012,990 | 0.778 | 12,386 | 20.9 |
| Connecticut | 2,756,485 | 0.765 | 10,517 | 22.1 |
| Massachusetts | 5,207,052 | 0.745 | 11,353 | 24.9 |
| Rhode Island | 801,654 | 0.731 | 9,388 | 22.7 |
| West Virginia | 1,219,024 | 0.683 | 13,190 | 21.0 |
| New Jersey | 6,249,905 | 0.674 | 11,788 | 22.1 |
| District of Columbia | 363,287 | 0.543 | 8,941 | 32.6 |
| New York | 9,408,796 | 0.474 | 11,359 | 21.7 |
| Delaware | 472,175 | 0.470 | 21,501 | 21.9 |
