= List of U.S. states by non-Hispanic white population =

Proportion of Americans who are Non-Hispanic White alone in each U.S. state, the District of Columbia, and Puerto Rico as of the 2020 United States Census

This is a list of U.S. states by Non-Hispanic Whites population. The United States Census Bureau defines non-Hispanic White as White Americans who are not of Hispanic or Latino ancestry (i.e., having ancestry from Spain or Latin America). At 191.6 million in 2020, non-Hispanic whites comprise 57.8% of the total U.S. population.

== Population by state or territory ==
White alone non-Latino population by state or territory (1970–2025)
State/Territory	1990		2000		2010		2020		2025		Population growth		
State/Territory	Pop	%	Pop	%	Pop	%	Pop	%	Pop	%	2020–2025	2010–2020	1980–2020
Alabama	2,960,167	73.3%	3,125,819	70.3%	3,204,402	67.0%	3,171,351	63.1%	3,209,447	61.8%	-1.3%	-1.0%	-11.0%
Alaska	406,722	73.9%	423,788	67.6%	455,320	64.1%	421,758	57.5%	411,209	55.8%	-1.7%	-7.4%	-22.2%
Arizona	2,626,185	71.7%	3,274,258	63.8%	3,695,647	57.8%	3,816,547	53.4%	3,823,656	50.2%	-3.2%	+3.3%	-25.5%
Arkansas	1,933,082	82.2%	2,100,135	78.6%	2,173,469	74.5%	2,063,550	68.5%	2,057,625	66.1%	-2.4%	-5.0%	-16.7%
California	17,029,126	57.2%	15,816,790	46.7%	14,956,253	40.1%	13,714,587	34.7%	12,429,024	31.6%	-3.1%	-8.3%	-39.3%
Colorado	2,658,945	80.7%	3,202,880	74.5%	3,520,793	70.0%	3,760,663	65.1%	3,701,542	61.6%	-3.5%	+6.8%	-19.3%
Connecticut	2,754,184	83.8%	2,638,845	77.5%	2,546,262	71.2%	2,279,232	63.2%	2,183,301	59.2%	-4.0%	-10.5%	-24.6%
Delaware	528,092	79.3%	567,973	72.5%	586,752	65.3%	579,851	58.6%	588,213	55.5%	-3.1%	-1.2%	-26.1%
(Washington, D.C.) District of Columbia	166,131	27.4%	159,178	27.8%	209,464	34.8%	261,771	38.0%	255,053	36.8%	-1.2%	+25.0%	+38.7%
Florida	9,475,326	73.2%	10,458,509	65.4%	10,884,722	57.9%	11,100,503	51.5%	11,322,230	48.3%	-3.2%	+1.2%	-29.6%
(Georgia (U.S. state)) Georgia	4,543,425	70.1%	5,128,661	62.6%	5,413,920	55.9%	5,362,156	50.1%	5,319,449	47.1%	-3.0%	-1.0%	-28.5%
Hawaii	347,644	31.4%	277,091	22.9%	309,343	22.7%	314,365	21.6%	299,494	20.9%	-0.7%	+1.6%	-31.2%
Idaho	928,661	92.2%	1,139,291	88.0%	1,316,243	84.0%	1,450,523	78.9%	1,543,463	76.0%	-2.9%	+10.2%	-11.4%
Illinois	8,550,208	74.8%	8,424,140	67.8%	8,167,753	63.7%	7,472,751	58.3%	7,097,567	55.8%	-2.5%	-8.5%	-22.1%
Indiana	4,965,242	89.6%	5,219,373	85.8%	5,286,453	81.5%	5,121,004	75.5%	5,068,396	72.7%	-2.8%	-0.4%	-15.7%
Iowa	2,663,840	95.9%	2,710,344	92.6%	2,701,123	88.7%	2,638,201	82.7%	2,597,202	80.2%	-2.5%	-6.8%	-10.9%
Kansas	2,190,524	88.4%	2,233,997	83.1%	2,230,539	78.2%	2,122,575	72.2%	2,089,111	70.2%	-2.0%	-4.9%	-18.3%
Kentucky	3,378,022	91.7%	3,608,013	89.3%	3,745,655	86.3%	3,664,764	81.3%	3,627,521	78.7%	-2.6%	-2.2%	-11.3%
Louisiana	2,776,022	65.8%	2,794,391	62.5%	2,734,884	60.3%	2,596,702	55.8%	2,482,919	53.8%	-2.0%	-5.1%	-15.2%
Maine	1,203,357	98.0%	1,230,297	96.5%	1,254,297	94.4%	1,228,264	90.2%	1,233,474	87.2%	-3.0%	-2.1%	-8.0%
Maryland	3,326,109	69.6%	3,286,547	62.1%	3,157,958	54.7%	2,913,782	47.2%	2,769,520	44.2%	-3.0%	-7.7%	-32.2%
Massachusetts	5,280,292	87.8%	5,198,359	81.9%	4,984,800	76.1%	4,748,897	67.6%	4,553,595	63.7%	-3.9%	-4.7%	-23.0%
Michigan	7,649,951	82.3%	7,806,691	78.6%	7,569,939	76.6%	7,295,651	72.4%	7,172,158	70.8%	-1.6%	-3.6%	-12%
Minnesota	4,101,266	93.7%	4,337,143	88.2%	4,405,142	83.1%	4,353,880	76.3%	4,262,879	73.1%	-3.2%	-1.2%	-15.3%
Mississippi	1,624,198	63.1%	1,727,908	60.7%	1,722,287	58.0%	1,639,077	55.4%	1,595,593	54.0%	-1.4%	-4.8%	-12.2%
Missouri	4,448,465	86.9%	4,686,474	83.8%	4,850,748	81.0%	4,663,907	75.8%	4,658,511	74.3%	-1.5%	-3.9%	-12.8%
Montana	733,878	91.8%	807,823	89.5%	868,628	87.8%	901,318	83.1%	935,788	81.2%	-1.9%	+3.8%	-9.5%
Nebraska	1,460,095	92.5%	1,494,494	87.3%	1,499,753	82.1%	1,484,687	75.7%	1,456,568	72.2%	-3.5%	-1.0%	-28.2%
Nevada	946,357	78.7%	1,303,001	65.2%	1,462,081	54.1%	1,425,952	45.9%	1,360,693	41.5%	-4.4%	-3.5%	-41.7%
New Hampshire	1,079,484	97.3%	1,175,252	95.1%	1,215,050	92.3%	1,200,649	87.2%	1,204,746	85.1%	-2.1%	-1.2%	-10.4%
New Jersey	5,718,966	74.0%	5,557,209	66.0%	5,214,878	59.3%	4,816,381	51.8%	4,609,262	48.3%	-3.5%	-7.6%	-30%
New Mexico	764,164	50.4%	813,495	44.7%	833,810	40.5%	772,952	36.5%	723,931	34.1%	-2.4%	-7.3%	-26.6%
(New York (state)) New York	12,460,189	69.3%	11,760,981	62.0%	11,304,247	58.3%	10,598,907	52.5%	10,069,725	50.3%	-2.2%	-6.4%	-24.2%
North Carolina	4,971,127	75.0%	5,647,155	70.2%	6,223,995	65.3%	6,312,148	60.5%	6,474,515	57.8%	-2.7%	+1.4%	-19.3 pp
North Dakota	601,592	94.2%	589,149	91.7%	598,007	88.9%	636,160	81.7%	630,759	78.9%	-2.8%	+6.4%	-13.1%
Ohio	9,444,622	87.1%	9,538,111	84.0%	9,359,263	81.1%	8,954,135	75.9%	8,740,912	73.4%	-2.5%	-4.3%	-12.9%
Oklahoma	2,547,588	81.0%	2,556,368	74.1%	2,575,381	68.7%	2,407,188	60.8%	2,387,662	57.9%	-2.9%	-6.5%	-25%
Oregon	2,579,732	90.8%	2,857,616	83.5%	3,005,848	78.5%	3,036,158	71.7%	2,897,973	67.8%	-3.9%	+1.0%	-21.0%
Pennsylvania	10,422,058	87.7%	10,322,455	84.1%	10,094,652	79.5%	9,553,417	73.5%	9,224,783	70.6%	-2.9%	-5.4%	-16.2%
Rhode Island	896,109	89.3%	858,433	81.9%	803,685	76.4%	754,050	68.7%	721,196	64.7%	-4.0%	-6.2%	-23.1%
South Carolina	2,390,056	68.5%	2,652,291	66.1%	2,962,740	64.1%	3,178,552	62.1%	3,398,907	61.0%	-1.1%	+7.3%	-9.3%
South Dakota	634,788	91.2%	664,585	88.0%	689,502	84.7%	705,583	79.6%	726,734	77.7%	-1.9%	+2.3%	-12.7%
Tennessee	4,027,631	82.6%	4,505,930	79.2%	4,800,782	75.6%	4,900,246	70.9%	5,057,604	69.1%	-1.8%	+2.1%	-14.2%
Texas	10,291,680	60.6%	10,933,313	52.4%	11,397,345	45.3%	11,584,597	39.7%	11,557,356	36.4%	-3.3%	+1.6%	-34.5%
Utah	1,571,254	91.2%	1,904,265	85.3%	2,221,719	80.4%	2,465,355	75.4%	2,546,313	72.0%	-3.4%	+11.0%	-17.3%
Vermont	552,184	98.1%	585,431	96.2%	590,223	94.3%	573,201	89.1%	566,750	87.9%	-1.2%	-2.9%	-9.2%
Virginia	4,701,650	76.0%	4,965,637	70.2%	5,186,450	64.8%	5,058,363	58.6%	4,976,231	56.0%	-2.6%	-2.5%	-29.9%
(Washington (state)) Washington	4,221,622	86.7%	4,652,490	78.9%	4,876,804	72.5%	4,918,820	63.8%	4,746,285	59.3%	-4.5%	+0.9%	-26.4%
West Virginia	1,718,896	95.8%	1,709,966	94.6%	1,726,256	93.2%	1,598,834	89.1%	1,553,769	88.0%	-1.1%	-7.4%	-7.0%
Wisconsin	4,464,677	91.3%	4,681,630	87.3%	4,738,411	83.3%	4,634,018	78.6%	4,567,326	76.5%	-2.1%	-2.2%	-13.9%
Wyoming	412,711	91.0%	438,799	88.9%	483,874	85.9%	469,664	81.4%	471,091	80.0%	-1.4%	-2.9%	-10.5%
American Samoa	–	–	682	1.2%	611	1.1%							
Guam	–	–	10,666	6.9%	11,001	6.9%							
Northern Mariana Islands	–	–	1,274	1.8%	916	1.7%							
Puerto Rico	–	–	33,966	0.9%	26,946	0.7%	24,548	0.8%	18,606	0.6%	-0.2%	-8.9%	
(United States Virgin Islands) U.S. Virgin Islands	–	–	8,580	7.9%	3,830	3.6%							
United States of America	188,128,296	75.6%	194,552,774	69.1%	196,817,552	63.7%	191,697,647	57.8%	187,959,031	55.0%	-2.8%	-2.6%	–23.5%

In 2020, in 36 out of the 50 US states, non-Latino whites made up a greater percentage of the state's population than the US overall share of 57.8%; however, the 14 states with greater shares of non-whites include the four most populous states (California, Texas, New York, and Florida). The total non-Latino white population shrunk between 2010 and 2020 in 34 out of the 50 states, and the relative share of non-Latino whites in the overall state population has declined in all 50 states during that same time period.

As of 2020, six states are majority-minority: Hawaii, California, New Mexico, Texas, Nevada, and Maryland. All of these states saw larger declines in the relative share of their non-Latino white populations between 1990-2020 than the national average of -23.5% with Nevada dropping by -41.7%, California by -39.3% and Texas by -34.5%.

== Historical population by state or territory ==
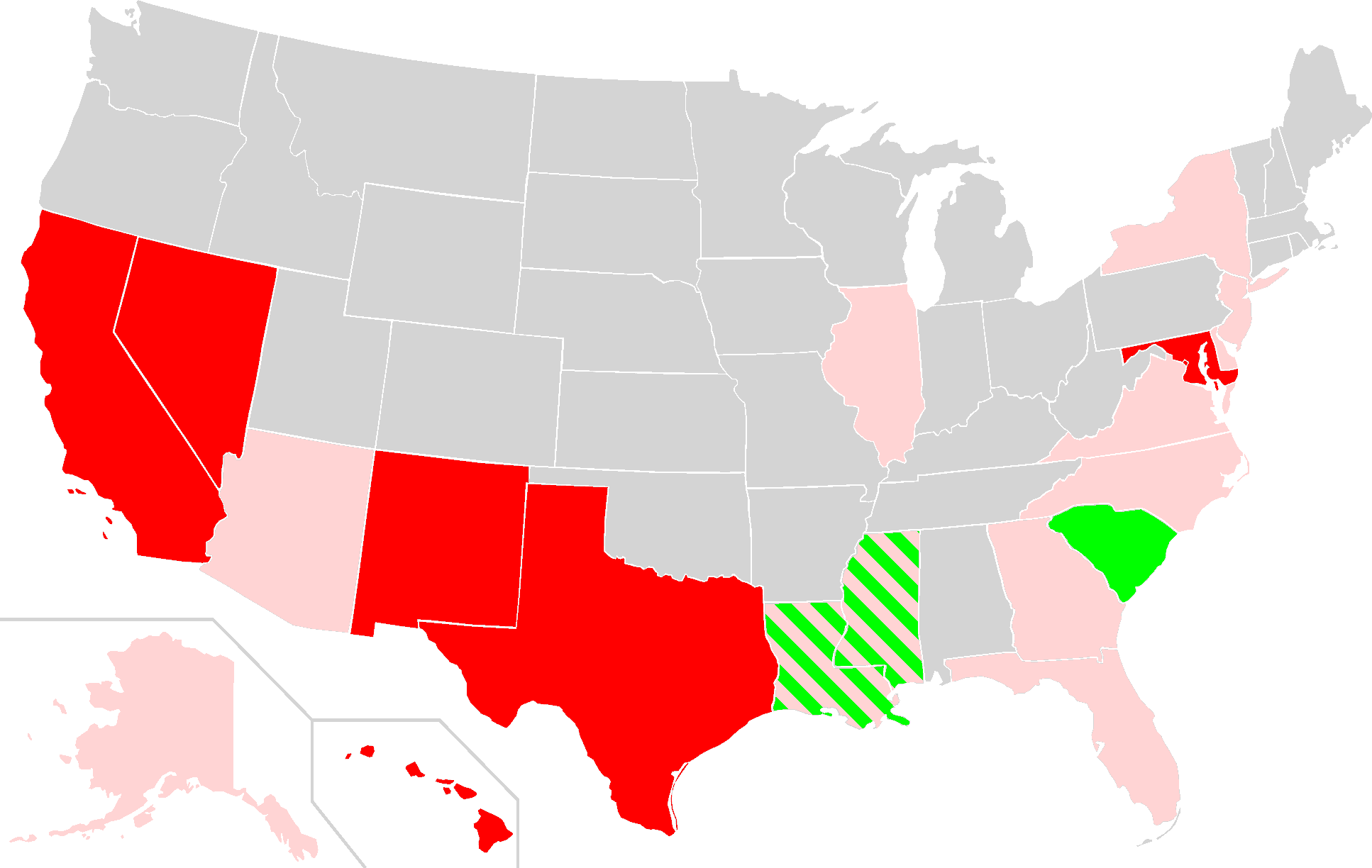
Currently are majority minority states Non-Hispanic whites are less than 60% of the population Were formerly majority minority states Green states were formerly majority minority, however by the 1930s, largely due to the Great Migration of African-Americans out of the rural Southern United States to the urban Northeast, had gained a white majority.

Non-Mexican white (1910–1930) and non-Hispanic white % of population (1940, 1970–2010) by U.S. State/Territory
State/Territory	1910	1920	1930	1940	1950	1960	1970	1980	1990	2000	2010	2020
Alabama	57.5%	61.6%	64.3%	65.3%			73.3%	73.3%	73.3%	70.3%	67.0%	65.1%
Alaska				48.3%			77.2%	75.8%	73.9%	67.6%	64.1%	59.6%
Arizona	59.9%	60.7%	60.7%	65.1%	70.2%	74.9%	74.3%	74.5%	71.7%	63.8%	57.8%	53.8%
Arkansas	71.8%	73.0%	74.1%	75.2%			81.0%	82.2%	82.2%	78.6%	74.5%	71.7%
California	93.0%	91.7%	88.8%	89.5%	86.5%	82.9%	76.3%	66.6%	57.2%	46.7%	40.1%	35.9%
Colorado	97.6%	96.8%	92.8%	90.3%	88.9%	88.0%	84.6%	82.7%	80.7%	74.5%	70.0%	67.4%
Connecticut	98.6%	98.4%	98.1%	97.9%			91.4%	88.0%	83.8%	77.5%	71.2%	65.3%
Delaware	84.6%	86.4%	86.3%	86.4%			84.1%	81.3%	79.3%	72.5%	65.3%	61.1%
(Washington, D.C.) District of Columbia	71.3%	74.7%	72.7%	71.4%			26.5%	25.7%	27.4%	27.8%	34.8%	37.7%
Florida	58.9%	65.9%	70.5%	71.5%			77.9%	76.7%	73.2%	65.4%	57.9%	53.1%
(Georgia (U.S. state)) Georgia	54.9%	58.3%	63.2%	65.2%			73.4%	71.6%	70.1%	62.6%	55.9%	51.6%
Hawaii				22.6%			38.0%	31.1%	31.4%	22.9%	22.7%	21.4%
Idaho	98.0%	98.3%	98.3%	98.4%			95.9%	93.9%	92.2%	88.0%	84.0%	81.4%
Illinois	98.0%	97.1%	95.2%	94.7%			83.5%	78.0%	74.8%	67.8%	63.7%	60.4%
Indiana	97.7%	97.2%	96.2%	96.3%			91.7%	90.2%	89.6%	85.8%	81.5%	78.0%
Iowa	99.3%	99.1%	99.1%	99.2%			98.0%	96.9%	95.9%	92.6%	88.7%	84.5%
Kansas	96.1%	95.7%	95.3%	95.6%			92.7%	90.5%	88.4%	83.1%	78.2%	75.1%
Kentucky	88.6%	90.2%	91.3%	92.5%			92.4%	91.7%	91.7%	89.3%	86.3%	83.9%
Louisiana	56.7%	60.8%	62.7%	63.7%			68.2%	67.6%	65.8%	62.5%	60.3%	58.1%
Maine	99.7%	99.7%	99.7%	99.7%			99.1%	98.3%	98.0%	96.5%	94.4%	92.7%
Maryland	82.0%	83.1%	83.0%	83.3%			80.4%	73.9%	69.6%	62.1%	54.7%	49.5%
Massachusetts	98.8%	98.7%	98.7%	98.6%			95.4%	92.3%	87.8%	81.9%	76.1%	70.5%
Michigan	99.1%	98.1%	96.0%	95.7%			87.1%	84.1%	82.3%	78.6%	76.6%	74.5%
Minnesota	99.2%	99.2%	99.0%	99.0%			97.7%	96.1%	93.7%	88.2%	83.1%	78.6%
Mississippi	43.7%	47.7%	49.6%	50.6%			62.6%	63.6%	63.1%	60.7%	58.0%	56.3%
Missouri	95.1%	94.6%	93.6%	93.4%			88.6%	87.7%	86.9%	83.8%	81.0%	79.0%
Montana	95.9%	97.3%	96.2%	96.2%			94.7%	93.4%	91.8%	89.5%	87.8%	85.7%
Nebraska	99.0%	98.5%	98.2%	98.2%			95.2%	94.0%	92.5%	87.3%	82.1%	77.8%
Nevada	89.7%	89.7%	89.4%	91.6%			86.7%	83.2%	78.7%	65.2%	54.1%	47.4%
New Hampshire	99.8%	99.8%	99.8%	99.9%			99.1%	98.4%	97.3%	95.1%	92.3%	89.4%
New Jersey	96.4%	96.2%	94.8%	94.3%			84.7%	79.1%	74.0%	66.0%	59.3%	54.1%
New Mexico	86.6%	83.8%	78.4%	50.9%	56.0%	63.8%	53.8%	52.6%	50.4%	44.7%	40.5%	36.4%
(New York (state)) New York	98.4%	97.9%	96.5%	94.6%			80.1%	75.0%	69.3%	62.0%	58.3%	55.0%
North Carolina	68.0%	69.7%	70.5%	71.9%			76.5%	75.3%	75.0%	70.2%	65.3%	62.3%
North Dakota	98.8%	98.9%	98.6%	98.3%			96.9%	95.5%	94.2%	91.7%	88.9%	83.3%
Ohio	97.6%	96.7%	95.3%	95.0%			89.8%	88.2%	87.1%	84.0%	81.1%	78.0%
Oklahoma	87.0%	89.4%	88.6%	89.9%			88.1%	85.0%	81.0%	74.1%	68.7%	64.4%
Oregon	97.3%	98.1%	98.2%	98.6%			95.8%	93.3%	90.8%	83.5%	78.5%	71.7%
Pennsylvania	97.4%	96.7%	95.4%	95.1%			90.3%	89.1%	87.7%	84.1%	79.5%	73.5%
Rhode Island	98.1%	98.3%	98.5%	98.3%			96.1%	93.4%	89.3%	81.9%	76.4%	68.7%
South Carolina	44.8%	48.6%	54.3%	57.1%			69.0%	68.3%	68.5%	66.1%	64.1%	62.1%
South Dakota	96.8%	97.3%	96.6%	96.2%			94.6%	92.3%	91.2%	88.0%	84.7%	79.6%
Tennessee	78.3%	80.7%	81.7%	82.5%			83.7%	83.1%	82.6%	79.2%	75.6%	70.9%
Texas	76.4%	75.7%	73.5%	74.1%	73.8%	72.6%	69.6%	65.7%	60.6%	52.4%	45.3%	39.7%
Utah	98.1%	98.1%	97.7%	98.2%			93.6%	92.4%	91.2%	85.3%	80.4%	75.4%
Vermont	99.5%	99.8%	99.8%	99.7%			99.2%	98.5%	98.1%	96.2%	94.3%	92.2%
Virginia	67.4%	70.1%	73.1%	75.3%			80.1%	78.2%	76.0%	70.2%	64.8%	58.6%
(Washington (state)) Washington	97.1%	97.3%	97.3%	97.7%			93.6%	90.2%	86.7%	78.9%	72.5%	63.8%
West Virginia	94.7%	94.1%	93.3%	93.7%			95.7%	95.6%	95.8%	94.6%	93.2%	89.1%
Wisconsin	99.4%	99.4%	99.1%	99.2%			95.6%	93.6%	91.3%	87.3%	83.3%	78.6%
Wyoming	95.9%	96.8%	94.9%	95.9%			92.1%	92.0%	91.0%	88.9%	85.9%	81.4%
Puerto Rico										0.9%	0.7%	0.8%
United States of America	88.5%	89.0%	88.7%	88.4%	87.5%	85.4%	83.5%	79.6%	75.6%	69.1%	63.7%	57.8%

== See also ==
- Demographics of the United States
- Lists of U.S. cities with non-white majority populations
- List of U.S. cities with non-Hispanic white plurality populations in 2010
- List of U.S. states by African-American population
- List of U.S. states by Hispanic and Latino population
- List of U.S. states by Amish population
