= List of United States cities by Spanish-speaking population =

This article contains tables of U.S. cities and metropolitan areas with information about the population aged 5 and over that speaks Spanish at home. The tables do not reflect the total number or percentage of people who know Spanish.

== Metropolitan areas ==
Number of people aged five or older who speak Spanish at home and proportion of population for 50 most populous metropolitan areas.

Metropolitan Area	Population Five Years and Over	Percentage Speaking Spanish at Home	Population Speaking Spanish at Home (in thousands)
New York-Newark-Jersey City, NY-NJ-PA	18,066,122	20.24	3656
Los Angeles-Long Beach-Anaheim, CA	12,450,222	36.0128	4483
Chicago-Naperville-Elgin, IL-IN-WI	8,898,149	17.3754	1546
Dallas-Fort Worth-Arlington, TX	7,060,749	23.0874	1630
Houston-The Woodlands-Sugar Land, TX	6,562,626	30.3156	1989
Washington-Arlington-Alexandria, DC-VA-MD-WV	5,880,783	13.7344	807
Miami-Fort Lauderdale-West Palm Beach, FL	5,820,979	42.8127	2492
Philadelphia-Camden-Wilmington, PA-NJ-DE-MD	5,752,420	6.7971	390
Atlanta-Sandy Springs-Roswell, GA	5,646,962	9.3372	527
Phoenix-Mesa-Scottsdale, AZ	4,646,594	19.928	925
Boston-Cambridge-Newton, MA-NH	4,616,969	9.2484	426
San Francisco-Oakland-Hayward, CA	4,480,888	15.5701	697
Riverside-San Bernardino-Ontario, CA	4,342,861	35.0667	1522
Detroit-Warren-Dearborn, MI	4,067,357	2.8258	114
Seattle-Tacoma-Bellevue, WA	3,741,070	6.9936	261
Minneapolis-St Paul-Bloomington, MN-WI	3,409,712	4.3657	148
San Diego-Carlsbad, CA	3,135,164	23.7449	744
Tampa-St Petersburg-Clearwater, FL	3,027,490	15.9556	483
Denver-Aurora-Lakewood, CO	2,793,811	13.2916	371
St Louis, MO-IL	2,638,802	2.278	60
Baltimore-Columbia-Towson, MD	2,634,601	4.2752	112
Charlotte-Concord-Gastonia, NC-SC	2,475,842	8.7373	216
Orlando-Kissimmee-Sanford, FL	2,459,990	26.025	640
San Antonio-New Braunfels, TX	2,379,896	31.395	747
Portland-Vancouver-Hillsboro, OR-WA	2,356,351	8.4915	200
Sacramento-Roseville-Arden-Arcade, CA	2,224,514	12.5715	279
Pittsburgh, PA	2,200,097	1.215	26
Las Vegas-Henderson-Paradise, NV	2,127,722	23.5248	500
Austin-Round Rock, TX	2,090,378	20.8172	435
Cincinnati, OH-KY-IN	2,083,212	2.6996	56
Kansas City, MO-KS	2,017,248	5.7645	116
Columbus, OH	1,983,611	2.926	58
Indianapolis-Carmel-Anderson, IN	1,940,723	4.4499	86
Cleveland-Elyria, OH	1,935,941	4.0657	78
San Jose-Sunnyvale-Santa Clara, CA	1,875,234	18.1844	341
Nashville-Davidson-Murfreesboro-Franklin, TN	1,814,069	6.3414	115
Virginia Beach-Norfolk-Newport News, VA-NC	1,655,337	4.32	71
Providence-Warwick, RI-MA	1,540,506	10.5316	162
Milwaukee-Waukesha-West Allis, WI	1,479,068	7.8792	116
Jacksonville, FL	1,464,683	6.2865	92
Oklahoma City, OK	1,317,588	9.6859	127
Raleigh, NC	1,307,559	9.0459	118
Memphis, TN-MS-AR	1,254,221	5.1792	64
Richmond, VA	1,218,730	5.3742	65
New Orleans-Metairie, LA	1,193,846	6.4746	77
Louisville/Jefferson County, KY-IN	1,190,566	3.9447	46
Hartford-West Hartford-East Hartford, CT	1,144,303	10.7399	122
Salt Lake City, UT	1,143,811	12.772	146
Buffalo-Cheektowaga-Niagara Falls, NY	1,066,858	3.3363	35
Birmingham-Hoover, AL	1,023,607	3.7278	38

== See also ==
- List of U.S. cities with large Hispanic and Latino populations
- List of U.S. states by Hispanic and Latino population
