= Non-Hispanic whites =

White Americans who are not Hispanic

Non-Hispanic Whites
- Distribution of Non-Hispanic Whites by county according to the 2020 census

Total population
- ▼203,890,513 (total) ▼61.6% of the total U.S. population (2020) ▼191,697,647 (white alone) ▼57.84% of the total US population (2020) and 12,192,866 (white in combination); 3.67% of the total U.S. population (2020)

Regions with significant populations
- Throughout the contiguous United States

Languages
- Predominantly American English

Religion
- 48% Protestant, 24% unaffiliated, 19% Catholic, 3% Jewish, 2% Mormon, 2% other faiths (2014)

Related ethnic groups
- Other Anglo-Americans

Non-Hispanic Whites, also referred to as non-Latino Whites, are White Americans classified by the United States census as "White" and not of Hispanic or Latino origin. According to annual estimates from the American Community Survey, as of July 1, 2024, the non-Hispanic White population was estimated at 191,382,624, representing approximately 56.3% of the total U.S. population.

Although non-Hispanic Whites remain the largest single racial and ethnic group in the United States, and still constitute a majority of the population, their share has declined significantly over the past eight decades. In 1940, they comprised approximately 89.8% of the total population, illustrating the extent of the demographic transformation that has occurred since the mid-20th century. This decline has been attributed to factors such as lower birth rates among White Americans, increased immigration from non-European regions, and broader sociocultural changes, including higher rates of interracial marriage and evolving patterns of racial self-identification.

The United States Census Bureau defines white to include European Americans, Middle Eastern Americans, and North African Americans. Americans of European ancestry are divided into various ethnic groups. More than half of the white population are German, Irish, English, Italian, French and Polish Americans. Many Americans are also the product of other European groups that migrated to parts of the US in the 19th and 20th centuries, as the bulk of immigrants from various countries in Northern, Central, Eastern, and Southeastern Europe, as well as the Caucasus region, migrated to the United States.

The non-Hispanic White population was heavily derived from British, as well as French settlement of the Americas, in addition to settlement by other Europeans such as the Germans (see Pennsylvania Dutch), Swiss, Belgians, Dutch, Austrians, and Swedes, which began in the 17th century (see History of the United States). The early Spanish presence in the country contributed a certain degree of that ancestry to the white population in parts of the south and southwest, as many Americans of Isleño, Basque, Asturian, or colonial Spanish heritage do not necessarily identify as "Hispanic or Latino" on the census, or are interchangeable with the "non-Hispanic White" category, as they lack any ties to Latin America, or recent ties to Spain.

Population growth since the early 19th century to the end of the 20th century is attributed to immigration and sustained high birth rates alongside relatively low death rates among settlers and natives alike. Population growth has slowed in the 21st century.

The classification is also typically used to refer to an English-speaking American, in distinction to Spanish speakers. In some parts of the country, the term Anglo-American is used to refer to non-Hispanic white English speakers as distinct from Spanish (and Portuguese or Italian) speakers, although the term is more frequently used to refer to people of perceived British or English descent.

== History ==
=== Early history ===
Immigration to the United States over time by region. From after the Hart–Celler Act was passed, European migration became significantly dwarfed by non-European immigration especially from Latin America and Asia in particular.

The first Europeans who came to present United States or Canada were Norse explorers around the year 1000; however, they were ultimately absorbed or killed off, leaving no permanent settlements behind. In the 1500s, Spain founded several settlements in the contiguous United States, like San Agustín. Later, Pilgrims and colonists came in the 1600s along the East Coast, mainly from England, in search of economic opportunities and religious freedom. Over time emigrants from Europe settled the coastal regions developing a commercial economy. Between one-half and two-thirds of White immigrants to the American colonies between the 1630s and American Revolution had come as indentured servants. The total number of European immigrants to all 13 colonies before 1775 was about 500,000; of these 55,000 were involuntary prisoners. Of the 450,000 or so European arrivals who came voluntarily, an estimated 48% were indentured.

=== Post-American Revolution ===
By the time of American Revolutionary War, there were about 2.5 million Whites in the colonies. The white population was largely of English, Irish, Scots-Irish, Scottish, German, Dutch and French Huguenot descent at the time. Between the revolution and the 1820s there was relatively little immigration to the United States. Starting after the 1820s large scale migration to the United States began and lasted until the 1920s. Many of the newcomers were Catholics of Irish, Italian, and Polish descent which lead to a nativist backlash. Some Americans worried about the growing Catholic population and wanted to maintain the United States as an Anglo Saxon Protestant nation. Over the course of the 19th century, European mass emigration to the United States and high birthrates grew the white population.

After the American Revolution, white Americans settled the entire nation west of Appalachian Mountains, ultimately displacing the Natives and populating the entire country by the late 19th century. All immigration to the United States declined markedly between the mid-1920s until the 1960s due to a combination of immigration laws, the Great Depression, and World War II. Waves of Jewish, Syrian, and Lebanese immigration also occurred around this time.

=== Contemporary era ===
Since 1965 white migration to the United States has been relatively minor compared to other racial and ethnic groups. During the 1990s there was a moderate increase from former communist countries of the Eastern Bloc and the Soviet Union. At the same time birthrates amongst Whites have fallen below replacement level. In 1980, non-Hispanic whites made up about 80 percent of the U.S. population, but that number has declined sharply in recent years. It is projected that white people will become a minority by 2045.

== Culture ==
White Americans have developed their own music, art, cuisine, fashion, and political economy largely based on a combination of traditional European ones. Today, the majority of White Americans are Protestants, although there are also large groups of Catholics and Jews throughout the population. Many Europeans often Anglicized their names and over time most Europeans adopted English as their primary language and intermarried with other white groups.

=== Cuisine ===
As of 2018 White Americans have been found to eat more vegetables and trend toward higher alcohol consumption than other ethnic groups.

=== Sports ===
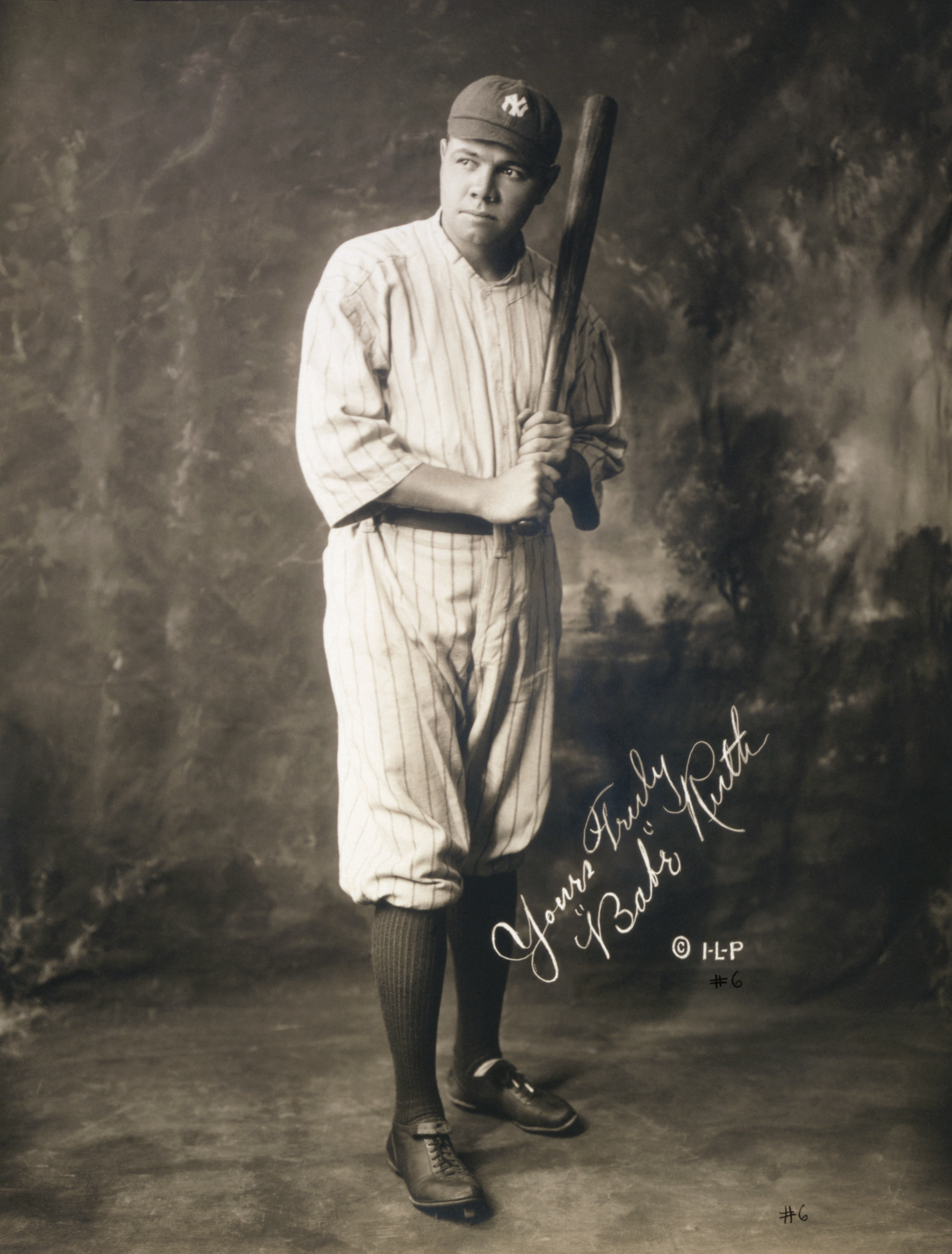
Babe Ruth, a famous white baseball player in the early 20th century

Baseball has been a mainstay of White American culture since the 1860s Civil War, contributing to nationwide melting pot dynamics. The sport had elements of racial segregation until the late 20th century, with emphasis on North-South reconciliation in the Civil War's aftermath resulting in the sport being mainly used to unify White people. The unwritten rules of baseball have also sometimes been used to assert an American standard of self-restraint that non-White people have often allegedly failed to uphold.

== Demographics ==
Non-Hispanic White population pyramid in 2020

=== Population ===
Non-Hispanic White American population distribution over time

1930 (Non-Mexican White)

1980

1990

2000

2010

2020

Non-Hispanic Whites are the largest racial and ethnic group in America, being the majority of America's population at 58.4%. Although the percentage has been declining in the last few decades, from 89.5% in 1950 to 59.3% in 2022. According to generational data from the 2020 census, the racial diversity of each age group is increasing. Non-Hispanic Whites make up 77% of the population over the age of 75, 67% of the population between the ages of 55 and 64, 55% of the population between the ages of 35 and 44, and just 50% of the population between the ages of 18 and 24. In actuality, non-Hispanic Whites have still been growing. Between 2000 and 2010, the non-Hispanic White population grew from 194,552,774 to 196,817,552. This was a growth of 1.2% over the 10-year period, due to population momentum. The population continued to grow to 196,817,552 in 2010 to 197,639,521 in 2022.

White population in America from 1980 - 2020
Year	Total population	Percentage of the American population	Actual increase
1980	180,256,103	79.6%	
1990	▲188,128,296	▼75.6%	▲4.36%
2000	▲194,552,774	▼69.1%	▲3.41%
2010	▲196,817,552	▼63.7%	▲1.16%
2020	▼191,697,647	▼57.8%	▼2.60%
2022(est.)	▲192,153,070	▼57.7%	▲0.23%
2024(est.)	▼191,382,624	▼56.3%	▼0.40%

Non-Hispanic White population pyramid from 1990 to 2020

The reason for falling percentage of non-Latino/Hispanic White Americans in the last century is due to multiple factors:

1. Non-European Immigration. The United States has the largest number of immigrants in the world, with the vast majority coming from countries where the population is of non-White and/or Latin American origin. Immigration to the United States from European countries has been in a steady decline since World War II averaging 56% of all immigrants in the 1950s and declining to 35% of all immigrants in the 1960s, 20% in the 1970s, 11% in the 1980s, 14% in the 1990s, and 13% in the 2000s. In 2009, approximately 90% of all immigrants came from non-European countries. The United States does receive a small number of non-Latino White immigrants, mainly from countries such as Canada, Poland, Russia, and the UK.

2. Intermarriage. The United States is seeing an unprecedented increase in intermarriage between the various racial and ethnic groups. In 2008, a record 14.6% of all new marriages in the United States were between spouses of a different race or ethnicity from one another. 9% of non-Latino Whites who married in 2008 married either a non-White or Latino. Among all newlyweds in 2008, intermarried pairings were primarily White-Latino of any race (41%) as compared to White-Asian (15%), White-Black (11%), and other combinations (33%). Other combinations consists of pairings between different minority groups, multi-racial people, and Native Indigenous Americans. The children of such unions would not automatically be classified as non-Latino White. One self-identifies his or her racial and/or ethnic category.

3. Methodology. In the 2000 Census, people were allowed to check more than one race in addition to choosing "Latino". There was strong opposition to this from some civil rights activists who feared that this would reduce the size of various racial minorities. The government responded by counting those who are white and of one minority race or ethnicity as minorities for the purposes of civil-rights monitoring and enforcement. Hence one could be 1/8th Black and still be counted as a minority. Also, because this does not apply to Latino origin (one is either Latino or not, but cannot be both Latino and non-Latino), the offspring of Latinos and non-Latinos are usually counted as Latino. In 2017, the Pew Research Center reported that high intermarriage rates and declining Latin American immigration has led to 11% of US adults with Latino ancestry (5.0 million people) to no longer identify as Latino. First-generation immigrants from Latin America identify themselves as "Latino" at a very high rate (97%), which slowly falls in each succeeding generation (in the second generation, to 92%; in the third, to 77%; and in the fourth, to 50%).

4. Decrease. Minority populations are younger than non-Latino Whites. The national median age in 2011 was 37.3 years, with non-Latino Whites having the oldest median age (42.3); by contrast, Latinos had the youngest median age (27.6). Non-Latino Blacks (32.9) and non-Latino Asians (35.9) also are younger than whites. In 2013, the Census Bureau reported that for the first time, due to the more advanced age profile of the non-Latino White population, non-Latino Whites died at a faster rate than non-Latino White births.

==== Births ====
In 2011, for the first time in American history, non-Hispanic Whites accounted for fewer than half of the births in the country, accounting for 49.6% of total births. This increased to 51.5% in 2021, regaining the majority in the process. This is likely due to the birth rate declining among other groups. For example, between 1990 and 2010, the birth rate declined 29% among Blacks, 25 percent among Asians, 21% among Hispanics, but only 5% among White people. If this trend continues, the White birth rate will surpass the Black birth rate in a few years.

A total of 1,887,656 babies were born in 2021, a 2.39% increase from 2020. Additionally, researchers found that the White fertility rate increased from 1.551 in 2020 to 1.598 in 2021, the first substantial rise since 2014. Although the exact reason of why the number of births rose in 2021 is unknown, a study showed that the uptick in births came among college-educated women and native-born Americans. Despite the increase, it is still below the replacement level of 2.100.

According to an analysis released in 2023 by William H. Frey, a senior fellow at the Brookings Institution, only 47 percent of American children are non-Hispanic White.

Number of White births from 2016 to 2024
Year	Number of births	General fertility rate	Birth rate	Total fertility rate	Share of U.S. births
2016	2,056,332	58.8	10.5	1.72	52.1%
2017	▼1,992,461	▼57.2	▼10.2	▼1.67	▼51.7%
2018	▼1,956,413	▼56.3	▼10.0	▼1.64	▼51.6%
2019	▼1,915,912	▼55.3	▼9.8	▼1.61	▼51.1%
2020	▼1,843,432	▼53.0	▼9.4	▼1.55	▼51.0%
2021	▲1,887,656	▲54.4	▲9.7	▲1.60	▲51.5%
2022	▼1,840,739	▼53.1	▼9.5	▼1.57	▼50.2%
2023	▼1,787,051	▼51.7	▼9.3	▼1.53	▼49.7%
2024	▼1,783,156	▼51.5	▼9.2	1.53	▼49.1%

=== Religion ===
==== Population ====
In 2014, the religious majority among Whites were Christians at 70%; more specifically, Protestants at 48%. However, there are also large groups of Catholics and Jews. Furthermore, 34% of White Americans go to religious services weekly, and an additional 32% go to religious services once or twice a month. Although historically, White Christians made up the majority of the American population, the number of White Christians has now plateaued at about 44% of the country's population.

== Population by state/territory ==
White alone non-Latino population by state or territory (1990–2020)
State/Territory	Pop 1990	% pop 1990	Pop 2000	% pop 2000	Pop 2010	% pop 2010	Pop 2020	% pop 2020	% growth 2010-2020	% pop 1990-2020
Alabama	2,960,167	73.3%	3,125,819	70.3%	3,204,402	67.0%	3,171,351	63.1%	-1.0%	-11.0%
Alaska	406,722	73.9%	423,788	67.6%	455,320	64.1%	421,758	57.5%	-7.4%	-22.2%
Arizona	2,626,185	71.7%	3,274,258	63.8%	3,695,647	57.8%	3,816,547	53.4%	+3.3%	-25.5%
Arkansas	1,933,082	82.2%	2,100,135	78.6%	2,173,469	74.5%	2,063,550	68.5%	-5.0%	-16.7%
California	17,029,126	57.2%	15,816,790	46.7%	14,956,253	40.1%	13,714,587	34.7%	-8.3%	-39.3%
Colorado	2,658,945	80.7%	3,202,880	74.5%	3,520,793	70.0%	3,760,663	65.1%	+6.8%	-19.3%
Connecticut	2,754,184	83.8%	2,638,845	77.5%	2,546,262	71.2%	2,279,232	63.2%	-10.5%	-24.6%
Delaware	528,092	79.3%	567,973	72.5%	586,752	65.3%	579,851	58.6%	-1.2%	-26.1%
(Washington, D.C.) District of Columbia	166,131	27.4%	159,178	27.8%	209,464	34.8%	261,771	38.0%	+25.0%	+38.7%
Florida	9,475,326	73.2%	10,458,509	65.4%	10,884,722	57.9%	11,100,503	51.5%	+1.2%	-29.6%
(Georgia (U.S. state)) Georgia	4,543,425	70.1%	5,128,661	62.6%	5,413,920	55.9%	5,362,156	50.1%	-1.0%	-28.5%
Hawaii	347,644	31.4%	277,091	22.9%	309,343	22.7%	314,365	21.6%	+1.6%	-31.2%
Idaho	928,661	92.2%	1,139,291	88.0%	1,316,243	84.0%	1,450,523	78.9%	+10.2%	-11.4%
Illinois	8,550,208	74.8%	8,424,140	67.8%	8,167,753	63.7%	7,472,751	58.3%	-8.5%	-22.1%
Indiana	4,965,242	89.6%	5,219,373	85.8%	5,286,453	81.5%	5,121,004	75.5%	-0.4%	-15.7%
Iowa	2,663,840	95.9%	2,710,344	92.6%	2,701,123	88.7%	2,638,201	82.7%	-6.8%	-10.9%
Kansas	2,190,524	88.4%	2,233,997	83.1%	2,230,539	78.2%	2,122,575	72.3%	-4.9%	-18.3%
Kentucky	3,378,022	91.7%	3,608,013	89.3%	3,745,655	86.3%	3,664,764	81.3%	-2.2%	-11.3%
Louisiana	2,776,022	65.8%	2,794,391	62.5%	2,734,884	60.3%	2,596,702	55.8%	-5.1%	-15.2%
Maine	1,203,357	98.0%	1,230,297	96.5%	1,254,297	94.4%	1,228,264	90.2%	-2.1%	-8.0%
Maryland	3,326,109	69.6%	3,286,547	62.1%	3,157,958	54.7%	2,913,782	47.2%	-7.7%	-32.2%
Massachusetts	5,280,292	87.8%	5,198,359	81.9%	4,984,800	76.1%	4,748,897	67.6%	-4.7%	-23.0%
Michigan	7,649,951	82.3%	7,806,691	78.6%	7,569,939	76.6%	7,295,651	72.4%	-3.6%	-12%
Minnesota	4,101,266	93.7%	4,337,143	88.2%	4,405,142	83.1%	4,353,880	76.3%	-1.2%	-15.3%
Mississippi	1,624,198	63.1%	1,727,908	60.7%	1,722,287	58.0%	1,639,077	55.4%	-4.8%	-12.2%
Missouri	4,448,465	86.9%	4,686,474	83.8%	4,850,748	81.0%	4,663,907	75.8%	-3.9%	-12.8%
Montana	733,878	91.8%	807,823	89.5%	868,628	87.8%	901,318	83.1%	+3.8%	-9.5%
Nebraska	1,460,095	92.5%	1,494,494	87.3%	1,499,753	82.1%	1,484,687	75.7%	-1.0%	-28.2%
Nevada	1,929,661	78.7%	1,303,001	65.2%	1,462,081	54.1%	1,425,952	45.9%	-3.5%	-41.7%
New Hampshire	1,079,484	97.3%	1,175,252	95.1%	1,215,050	92.3%	1,200,649	87.2%	-1.2%	-10.4%
New Jersey	5,718,966	74.0%	5,557,209	66.0%	5,214,878	59.3%	4,816,381	51.9%	-7.6%	-30%
New Mexico	764,164	50.4%	813,495	44.7%	833,810	40.5%	772,952	36.5%	-7.3%	-26.6%
(New York (state)) New York	12,460,189	69.3%	11,760,981	62.0%	11,304,247	58.3%	10,598,907	52.5%	-6.4%	-24.2%
North Carolina	4,971,127	75.0%	5,647,155	70.2%	6,223,995	65.3%	6,312,148	60.5%	+1.4%	-19.3%
North Dakota	601,592	94.2%	589,149	91.7%	598,007	88.9%	636,160	81.7%	+6.4%	-13.1%
Ohio	9,444,622	87.1%	9,538,111	84.0%	9,359,263	81.1%	8,954,135	75.9%	-4.3%	-12.9%
Oklahoma	2,547,588	81.0%	2,556,368	74.1%	2,575,381	68.7%	2,407,188	60.8%	-6.5%	-25%
Oregon	2,579,732	90.8%	2,857,616	83.5%	3,005,848	78.5%	3,036,158	71.7%	+1.0%	-21.0%
Pennsylvania	10,422,058	87.7%	10,322,455	84.1%	10,094,652	79.5%	9,553,417	73.5%	-5.4%	-16.2%
Rhode Island	896,109	89.3%	858,433	81.9%	803,685	76.4%	754,050	68.7%	-6.2%	-23.1%
South Carolina	2,390,056	68.5%	2,652,291	66.1%	2,962,740	64.1%	3,178,552	62.1%	+7.3%	-9.3%
South Dakota	634,788	91.2%	664,585	88.0%	689,502	84.7%	705,583	79.6%	+2.3%	-12.7%
Tennessee	4,027,631	82.6%	4,505,930	79.2%	4,800,782	75.6%	4,900,246	70.9%	+2.1%	-14.2%
Texas	10,291,680	60.6%	10,933,313	52.4%	11,397,345	45.3%	11,584,597	39.8%	+1.6%	-34.5%
Utah	1,571,254	91.2%	1,904,265	85.3%	2,221,719	80.4%	2,465,355	75.4%	+11.0%	-17.3%
Vermont	552,184	98.1%	585,431	96.2%	590,223	94.3%	573,201	89.1%	-2.9%	-9.2%
Virginia	4,701,650	76.0%	4,965,637	70.2%	5,186,450	64.8%	5,058,363	58.6%	-2.5%	-29.9%
(Washington (state)) Washington	4,221,622	86.7%	4,652,490	78.9%	4,876,804	72.5%	4,918,820	63.8%	+0.9%	-26.4%
West Virginia	1,718,896	95.8%	1,709,966	94.6%	1,726,256	93.2%	1,598,834	89.1%	-7.4%	-7.0%
Wisconsin	4,464,677	91.3%	4,681,630	87.3%	4,738,411	83.3%	4,634,018	78.6%	-2.2%	-13.9%
Wyoming	412,711	91.0%	438,799	88.9%	483,874	85.9%	469,664	81.4%	-2.9%	-10.5%
American Samoa			682	1.2%	611	1.1%				
Guam			10,666	6.9%	11,001	6.9%				
Northern Mariana Islands			1,274	1.8%	916	1.7%				
Puerto Rico			33,966	0.9%	26,946	0.7%	24,548	0.8%	-8.9%	
(United States Virgin Islands) U.S. Virgin Islands			8,580	7.9%	3,830	3.6%				
United States of America	188,128,296	75.6%	194,552,774	69.1%	196,817,552	63.7%	191,697,647	57.8%	-2.6%	–23.5%

== Historical population by state or territory ==
Non-Mexican white (1910–1930) and non-Latino white % of population (1940–2020) by US state
State/Territory	1910	1920	1930	1940	1950	1960	1970	1980	1990	2000	2010	2020
Alabama	57.5%	61.6%	64.3%	65.3%			73.3%	73.3%	73.3%	70.3%	67.0%	65.1%
Alaska				48.3%			77.2%	75.8%	73.9%	67.6%	64.1%	59.6%
Arizona	59.9%	60.7%	60.7%	65.1%	70.2%	74.9%	74.3%	74.5%	71.7%	63.8%	57.8%	53.8%
Arkansas	71.8%	73.0%	74.1%	75.2%			81.0%	82.2%	82.2%	78.6%	74.5%	71.7%
California	93.0%	91.7%	88.8%	89.5%	86.5%	82.9%	76.3%	66.6%	57.2%	46.7%	40.1%	35.9%
Colorado	97.6%	96.8%	92.8%	90.3%	88.9%	88.0%	84.6%	82.7%	80.7%	74.5%	70.0%	67.4%
Connecticut	98.6%	98.4%	98.1%	97.9%			91.4%	88.0%	83.8%	77.5%	71.2%	65.3%
Delaware	84.6%	86.4%	86.3%	86.4%			84.1%	81.3%	79.3%	72.5%	65.3%	61.1%
(Washington, D.C.) District of Columbia	71.3%	74.7%	72.7%	71.4%			26.5%	25.7%	27.4%	27.8%	34.8%	37.7%
Florida	58.9%	65.9%	70.5%	71.5%			77.9%	76.7%	73.2%	65.4%	57.9%	53.1%
(Georgia (U.S. state)) Georgia	54.9%	58.3%	63.2%	65.2%			73.4%	71.6%	70.1%	62.6%	55.9%	51.6%
Hawaii				22.6%			38.0%	31.1%	31.4%	22.9%	22.7%	21.4%
Idaho	98.0%	98.3%	98.3%	98.4%			95.9%	93.9%	92.2%	88.0%	84.0%	81.4%
Illinois	98.0%	97.1%	95.2%	94.7%			83.5%	78.0%	74.8%	67.8%	63.7%	60.4%
Indiana	97.7%	97.2%	96.2%	96.3%			91.7%	90.2%	89.6%	85.8%	81.5%	78.0%
Iowa	99.3%	99.1%	99.1%	99.2%			98.0%	96.9%	95.9%	92.6%	88.7%	84.5%
Kansas	96.1%	95.7%	95.3%	95.6%			92.7%	90.5%	88.4%	83.1%	78.2%	75.1%
Kentucky	88.6%	90.2%	91.3%	92.5%			92.4%	91.7%	91.7%	89.3%	86.3%	83.9%
Louisiana	56.7%	60.8%	62.7%	63.7%			68.2%	67.6%	65.8%	62.5%	60.3%	58.1%
Maine	99.7%	99.7%	99.7%	99.7%			99.1%	98.3%	98.0%	96.5%	94.4%	92.7%
Maryland	82.0%	83.1%	83.0%	83.3%			80.4%	73.9%	69.6%	62.1%	54.7%	49.5%
Massachusetts	98.8%	98.7%	98.7%	98.6%			95.4%	92.3%	87.8%	81.9%	76.1%	70.5%
Michigan	99.1%	98.1%	96.0%	95.7%			87.1%	84.1%	82.3%	78.6%	76.6%	74.5%
Minnesota	99.2%	99.2%	99.0%	99.0%			97.7%	96.1%	93.7%	88.2%	83.1%	78.6%
Mississippi	43.7%	47.7%	49.6%	50.6%			62.6%	63.6%	63.1%	60.7%	58.0%	56.3%
Missouri	95.1%	94.6%	93.6%	93.4%			88.6%	87.7%	86.9%	83.8%	81.0%	79.0%
Montana	95.9%	97.3%	96.2%	96.2%			94.7%	93.4%	91.8%	89.5%	87.8%	85.7%
Nebraska	99.0%	98.5%	98.2%	98.2%			95.2%	94.0%	92.5%	87.3%	82.1%	77.8%
Nevada	89.7%	89.7%	89.4%	91.6%			86.7%	83.2%	78.7%	65.2%	54.1%	47.4%
New Hampshire	99.8%	99.8%	99.8%	99.9%			99.1%	98.4%	97.3%	95.1%	92.3%	89.4%
New Jersey	96.4%	96.2%	94.8%	94.3%			84.7%	79.1%	74.0%	66.0%	59.3%	54.1%
New Mexico	86.6%	83.8%	78.4%	50.9%	56.0%	63.8%	53.8%	52.6%	50.4%	44.7%	40.5%	36.4%
(New York (state)) New York	98.4%	97.9%	96.5%	94.6%			80.1%	75.0%	69.3%	62.0%	58.3%	55.0%
North Carolina	68.0%	69.7%	70.5%	71.9%			76.5%	75.3%	75.0%	70.2%	65.3%	62.3%
North Dakota	98.8%	98.9%	98.6%	98.3%			96.9%	95.5%	94.2%	91.7%	88.9%	83.3%
Ohio	97.6%	96.7%	95.3%	95.0%			89.8%	88.2%	87.1%	84.0%	81.1%	78.0%
Oklahoma	87.0%	89.4%	88.6%	89.9%			88.1%	85.0%	81.0%	74.1%	68.7%	64.4%
Oregon	97.3%	98.1%	98.2%	98.6%			95.8%	93.3%	90.8%	83.5%	78.5%	71.7%
Pennsylvania	97.4%	96.7%	95.4%	95.1%			90.3%	89.1%	87.7%	84.1%	79.5%	73.5%
Rhode Island	98.1%	98.3%	98.5%	98.3%			96.1%	93.4%	89.3%	81.9%	76.4%	68.7%
South Carolina	44.8%	48.6%	54.3%	57.1%			69.0%	68.3%	68.5%	66.1%	64.1%	62.1%
South Dakota	96.8%	97.3%	96.6%	96.2%			94.6%	92.3%	91.2%	88.0%	84.7%	79.6%
Tennessee	78.3%	80.7%	81.7%	82.5%			83.7%	83.1%	82.6%	79.2%	75.6%	70.9%
Texas	76.4%	75.7%	73.5%	74.1%	73.8%	72.6%	69.6%	65.7%	60.6%	52.4%	45.3%	39.7%
Utah	98.1%	98.1%	97.7%	98.2%			93.6%	92.4%	91.2%	85.3%	80.4%	75.4%
Vermont	99.5%	99.8%	99.8%	99.7%			99.2%	98.5%	98.1%	96.2%	94.3%	92.2%
Virginia	67.4%	70.1%	73.1%	75.3%			80.1%	78.2%	76.0%	70.2%	64.8%	58.6%
(Washington (state)) Washington	97.1%	97.3%	97.3%	97.7%			93.6%	90.2%	86.7%	78.9%	72.5%	63.8%
West Virginia	94.7%	94.1%	93.3%	93.7%			95.7%	95.6%	95.8%	94.6%	93.2%	89.1%
Wisconsin	99.4%	99.4%	99.1%	99.2%			95.6%	93.6%	91.3%	87.3%	83.3%	78.6%
Wyoming	95.9%	96.8%	94.9%	95.9%			92.1%	92.0%	91.0%	88.9%	85.9%	81.4%
Puerto Rico										0.9%	0.7%	0.8%
United States of America	88.5%	89.0%	88.7%	88.4%	87.5%	85.4%	83.5%	79.6%	75.6%	69.1%	63.7%	57.8%

== See also ==
- Non-Hispanic blacks
- Race and ethnicity in the United States census
- Anglo
- Emigration from Europe
- European Americans
- Stereotypes of white Americans
- White Americans
- White Anglo-Saxon Protestant
- White ethnic
- White Latino Americans
- White Southerners
- White demographic decline
- List of U.S. states by non-Hispanic white population
- List of U.S. cities with non-Hispanic white plurality populations in 2010
