= List of majority-Hispanic or Latino counties in the United States =

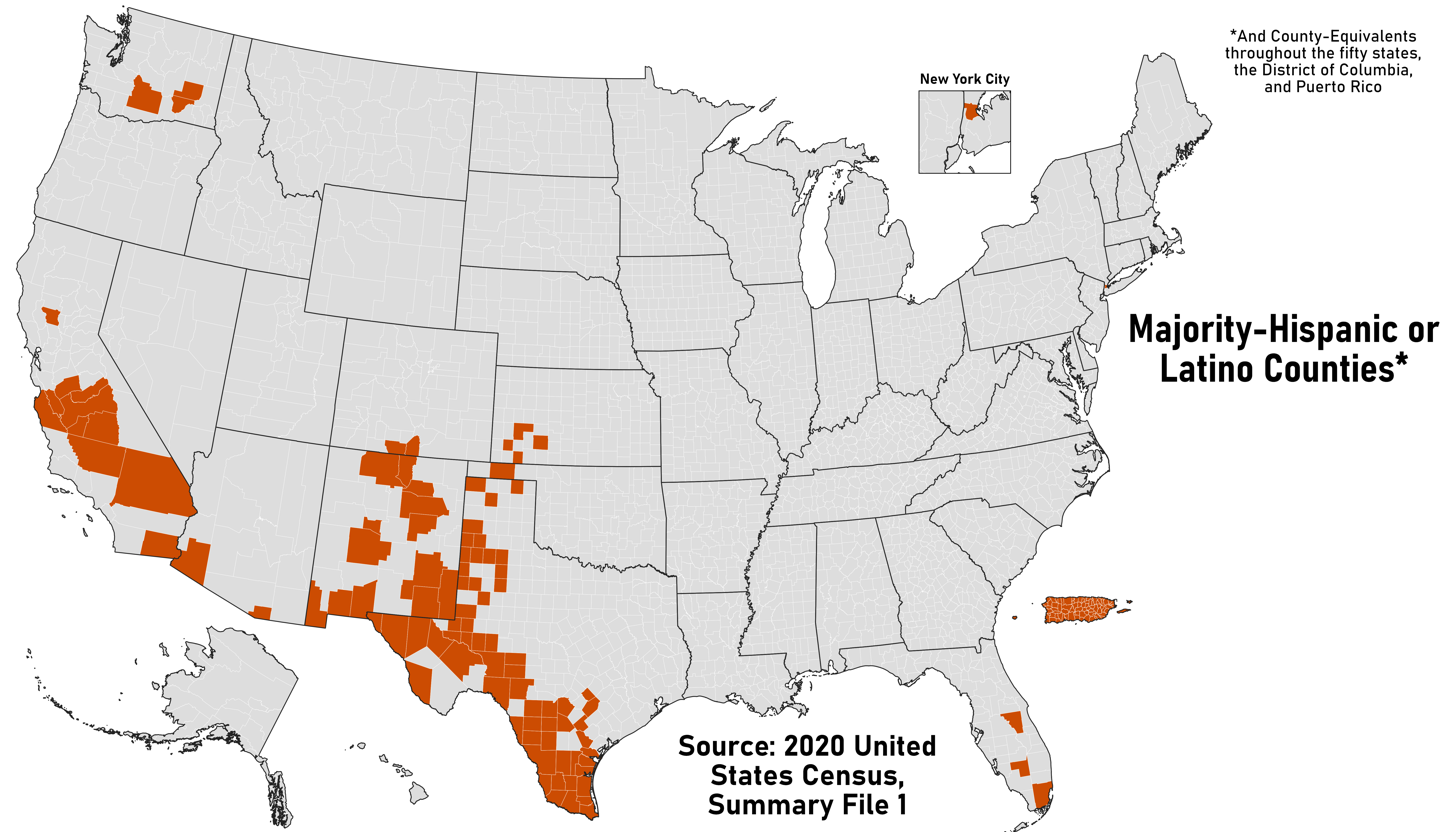
Majority-Hispanic Counties in the U.S. as of the 2020 United States Census

This list of majority-Hispanic or Latino counties in the United States covers the counties and county-equivalents in the 50 U.S. states, the District of Columbia, and the territory of Puerto Rico and the population in each county that is either Hispanic or Latino.

The data sources for the list are the 2020 United States Census and the 2010 United States census.

At the time of the 2020 Census, there were 65.3 million Americans who were Hispanic or Latino, making up 19.5% of the U.S. population. State by state, the highest number of Hispanic Americans could be found in California (15.58 million), Texas (11.44 million), Florida (5.70 million), New York (3.95 million), and Puerto Rico (3.25 million). Meanwhile, the highest proportions of Hispanic Americans were in Puerto Rico (98.88%), New Mexico (47.74%), California (39.40%), Texas (39.26%), and Arizona (30.65%).

Throughout the country, there are 179 county-equivalents where over 50% of the population are either Hispanic or Latino. Of these, 78 were municipalities in Puerto Rico, and 61 were counties in Texas. Moreover, there were 13 counties in New Mexico and 11 counties in California with Hispanic majorities. Kansas has four Hispanic-majority counties, Florida and Washington both have three, Arizona and Colorado both have two, and Oklahoma and New York state each have one Hispanic-majority county.

In 2020, the most populated counties which had a Hispanic majority were Miami-Dade County, Florida (population 2.70 million), San Bernardino County, California (population 2.18 million), Bexar County, Texas (population 2.01 million), Bronx County, New York (population 1.47 million), and Fresno County, California (population 1.01 million).

== List ==
The list below displays each majority-Hispanic county (or county-equivalent) in the fifty U.S. states, the District of Columbia, and Puerto Rico. It includes the county's total population, the number of Hispanic people in the county, and the percentage of people in the county who are Hispanic all as of the 2020 Census as well as these same statistics for the 2010 Census. The table also includes percentage change of all these values between the two censuses. The table is initially sorted by the Hispanic proportion of each county in 2020 but is sortable by any of its columns, as can be found by clicking the table headers.

Counties in Puerto Rico are shaded in yellow.

County	State	2020			2010			Percent Change (2010 - 2020)		
County	State	Hispanic %	Population	Hispanic population	Hispanic %	Population	Hispanic population	Hispanic %	Population	Hispanic population
Barranquitas	Puerto Rico	99.73%	28,983	28,905	99.31%	30,318	30,110	0.42%	-4.40%	-4.00%
Adjuntas	Puerto Rico	99.67%	18,020	17,961	99.58%	19,483	19,401	0.09%	-7.51%	-7.42%
Guayanilla	Puerto Rico	99.65%	17,784	17,721	99.51%	21,581	21,475	0.14%	-17.59%	-17.48%
Comerío	Puerto Rico	99.62%	18,883	18,812	99.58%	20,778	20,691	0.04%	-9.12%	-9.08%
Naranjito	Puerto Rico	99.62%	29,241	29,131	99.55%	30,402	30,264	0.08%	-3.82%	-3.74%
Moca	Puerto Rico	99.62%	37,460	37,316	99.44%	40,109	39,885	0.17%	-6.60%	-6.44%
Villalba	Puerto Rico	99.62%	22,093	22,008	99.65%	26,073	25,983	-0.04%	-15.26%	-15.30%
Morovis	Puerto Rico	99.57%	28,727	28,604	99.43%	32,610	32,425	0.14%	-11.91%	-11.78%
Orocovis	Puerto Rico	99.55%	21,434	21,338	99.58%	23,423	23,325	-0.03%	-8.49%	-8.52%
San Lorenzo	Puerto Rico	99.54%	37,693	37,520	99.52%	41,058	40,860	0.02%	-8.20%	-8.17%
Florida	Puerto Rico	99.53%	11,692	11,637	99.56%	12,680	12,624	-0.03%	-7.79%	-7.82%
Peñuelas	Puerto Rico	99.51%	20,399	20,299	99.36%	24,282	24,126	0.15%	-15.99%	-15.86%
Corozal	Puerto Rico	99.49%	34,571	34,396	99.42%	37,142	36,927	0.07%	-6.92%	-6.85%
Barceloneta	Puerto Rico	99.49%	22,657	22,542	99.37%	24,816	24,659	0.13%	-8.70%	-8.59%
Jayuya	Puerto Rico	99.49%	14,779	14,703	99.64%	16,642	16,582	-0.15%	-11.19%	-11.33%
Cidra	Puerto Rico	99.48%	39,970	39,762	99.45%	43,480	43,239	0.03%	-8.07%	-8.04%
Juana Díaz	Puerto Rico	99.46%	46,538	46,285	99.39%	50,747	50,437	0.07%	-8.29%	-8.23%
Aguas Buenas	Puerto Rico	99.46%	24,223	24,091	99.49%	28,659	28,513	-0.04%	-15.48%	-15.51%
Maricao	Puerto Rico	99.45%	4,755	4,729	99.38%	6,276	6,237	0.07%	-24.24%	-24.18%
Ciales	Puerto Rico	99.45%	16,984	16,891	99.70%	18,782	18,725	-0.24%	-9.57%	-9.79%
Yabucoa	Puerto Rico	99.45%	30,426	30,258	99.33%	37,941	37,686	0.12%	-19.81%	-19.71%
Yauco	Puerto Rico	99.44%	34,172	33,982	99.50%	42,043	41,831	-0.05%	-18.72%	-18.76%
Maunabo	Puerto Rico	99.44%	10,589	10,530	99.24%	12,225	12,132	0.20%	-13.38%	-13.20%
Sabana Grande	Puerto Rico	99.44%	22,729	22,602	99.50%	25,265	25,139	-0.06%	-10.04%	-10.09%
Las Piedras	Puerto Rico	99.44%	35,180	34,983	99.38%	38,675	38,435	0.06%	-9.04%	-8.98%
Santa Isabel	Puerto Rico	99.43%	20,281	20,166	99.56%	23,274	23,171	-0.12%	-12.86%	-12.97%
Coamo	Puerto Rico	99.41%	34,668	34,464	99.57%	40,512	40,338	-0.16%	-14.43%	-14.56%
Juncos	Puerto Rico	99.41%	37,012	36,794	99.29%	40,290	40,003	0.12%	-8.14%	-8.02%
Toa Alta	Puerto Rico	99.40%	66,852	66,453	99.32%	74,066	73,566	0.08%	-9.74%	-9.67%
San Sebastián	Puerto Rico	99.40%	39,345	39,110	99.33%	42,430	42,144	0.08%	-7.27%	-7.20%
Cayey	Puerto Rico	99.39%	41,652	41,400	99.35%	48,119	47,806	0.05%	-13.44%	-13.40%
Loíza	Puerto Rico	99.39%	23,693	23,549	99.41%	30,060	29,883	-0.02%	-21.18%	-21.20%
Guayama	Puerto Rico	99.34%	36,614	36,371	99.11%	45,362	44,958	0.23%	-19.28%	-19.10%
Patillas	Puerto Rico	99.33%	15,985	15,878	99.35%	19,277	19,151	-0.02%	-17.08%	-17.09%
Canóvanas	Puerto Rico	99.31%	42,337	42,044	99.24%	47,648	47,285	0.07%	-11.15%	-11.08%
Lares	Puerto Rico	99.30%	28,105	27,909	99.29%	30,753	30,535	0.01%	-8.61%	-8.60%
Aguada	Puerto Rico	99.28%	38,136	37,860	99.39%	41,959	41,701	-0.11%	-9.11%	-9.21%
Arecibo	Puerto Rico	99.27%	87,754	87,117	99.21%	96,440	95,677	0.07%	-9.01%	-8.95%
Vega Baja	Puerto Rico	99.26%	54,414	54,012	99.26%	59,662	59,223	0.00%	-8.80%	-8.80%
Manatí	Puerto Rico	99.26%	39,492	39,198	99.24%	44,113	43,779	0.01%	-10.48%	-10.46%
Lajas	Puerto Rico	99.25%	23,334	23,160	99.32%	25,753	25,578	-0.07%	-9.39%	-9.45%
San Germán	Puerto Rico	99.25%	31,879	31,639	99.23%	35,527	35,252	0.02%	-10.27%	-10.25%
Gurabo	Puerto Rico	99.25%	40,622	40,316	99.22%	45,369	45,015	0.03%	-10.46%	-10.44%
Hormigueros	Puerto Rico	99.25%	15,654	15,536	99.47%	17,250	17,158	-0.22%	-9.25%	-9.45%
Utuado	Puerto Rico	99.24%	28,287	28,072	99.42%	33,149	32,956	-0.18%	-14.67%	-14.82%
Caguas	Puerto Rico	99.23%	127,244	126,270	99.14%	142,893	141,668	0.09%	-10.95%	-10.87%
Las Marías	Puerto Rico	99.20%	8,874	8,803	99.39%	9,881	9,821	-0.19%	-10.19%	-10.37%
Hatillo	Puerto Rico	99.18%	38,486	38,171	99.17%	41,953	41,604	0.01%	-8.26%	-8.25%
Salinas	Puerto Rico	99.18%	25,789	25,577	99.31%	31,078	30,865	-0.14%	-17.02%	-17.13%
Quebradillas	Puerto Rico	99.17%	23,638	23,441	99.34%	25,919	25,748	-0.17%	-8.80%	-8.96%
Naguabo	Puerto Rico	99.16%	23,386	23,190	99.22%	26,720	26,512	-0.06%	-12.48%	-12.53%
Arroyo	Puerto Rico	99.15%	15,843	15,708	99.05%	19,575	19,390	0.09%	-19.07%	-18.99%
Ponce	Puerto Rico	99.13%	137,491	136,300	99.18%	166,327	164,955	-0.04%	-17.34%	-17.37%
Guánica	Puerto Rico	99.10%	13,787	13,663	99.35%	19,427	19,301	-0.25%	-29.03%	-29.21%
Trujillo Alto	Puerto Rico	99.09%	67,740	67,126	98.91%	74,842	74,029	0.18%	-9.49%	-9.32%
Camuy	Puerto Rico	99.08%	32,827	32,525	99.41%	35,159	34,950	-0.33%	-6.63%	-6.94%
Aibonito	Puerto Rico	99.08%	24,637	24,410	99.34%	25,900	25,729	-0.26%	-4.88%	-5.13%
Añasco	Puerto Rico	99.02%	25,596	25,344	99.22%	29,261	29,034	-0.21%	-12.53%	-12.71%
Cataño	Puerto Rico	99.00%	23,155	22,923	99.03%	28,140	27,866	-0.03%	-17.71%	-17.74%
Toa Baja	Puerto Rico	98.97%	75,293	74,515	98.97%	89,609	88,684	0.00%	-15.98%	-15.98%
Bayamón	Puerto Rico	98.96%	185,187	183,263	98.99%	208,116	206,008	-0.03%	-11.02%	-11.04%
Cabo Rojo	Puerto Rico	98.79%	47,158	46,589	98.94%	50,917	50,376	-0.14%	-7.38%	-7.52%
Vega Alta	Puerto Rico	98.79%	35,395	34,967	98.74%	39,951	39,448	0.05%	-11.40%	-11.36%
Río Grande	Puerto Rico	98.78%	47,060	46,484	99.00%	54,304	53,762	-0.23%	-13.34%	-13.54%
Isabela	Puerto Rico	98.72%	42,943	42,395	99.04%	45,631	45,193	-0.32%	-5.89%	-6.19%
Mayagüez	Puerto Rico	98.67%	73,077	72,107	98.94%	89,080	88,132	-0.26%	-17.96%	-18.18%
Carolina	Puerto Rico	98.45%	154,815	152,417	98.57%	176,762	174,234	-0.12%	-12.42%	-12.52%
Aguadilla	Puerto Rico	98.41%	55,101	54,227	98.52%	60,949	60,046	-0.10%	-9.59%	-9.69%
Fajardo	Puerto Rico	98.23%	32,124	31,554	98.24%	36,993	36,342	-0.01%	-13.16%	-13.17%
Ceiba	Puerto Rico	98.16%	11,307	11,099	98.75%	13,631	13,461	-0.59%	-17.05%	-17.55%
Humacao	Puerto Rico	98.05%	50,896	49,903	98.96%	58,466	57,856	-0.91%	-12.95%	-13.75%
Guaynabo	Puerto Rico	97.90%	89,780	87,894	98.23%	97,924	96,193	-0.33%	-8.32%	-8.63%
San Juan	Puerto Rico	97.76%	342,259	334,601	98.19%	395,326	388,186	-0.43%	-13.42%	-13.80%
Starr	Texas	97.68%	65,920	64,393	95.68%	60,968	58,337	2.00%	8.12%	10.38%
Luquillo	Puerto Rico	97.09%	17,781	17,263	97.92%	20,068	19,651	-0.84%	-11.40%	-12.15%
Dorado	Puerto Rico	96.62%	35,879	34,666	98.04%	38,165	37,418	-1.42%	-5.99%	-7.35%
Webb	Texas	95.22%	267,114	254,354	95.74%	250,304	239,653	-0.52%	6.72%	6.13%
Maverick	Texas	94.90%	57,887	54,936	95.68%	54,258	51,914	-0.78%	6.69%	5.82%
Rincón	Puerto Rico	94.88%	15,187	14,409	96.45%	15,200	14,660	-1.57%	-0.09%	-1.71%
Zapata	Texas	93.59%	13,889	12,999	93.34%	14,018	13,084	0.25%	-0.92%	-0.65%
Zavala	Texas	92.49%	9,670	8,944	93.87%	11,677	10,961	-1.38%	-17.19%	-18.40%
Vieques	Puerto Rico	91.96%	8,249	7,586	94.34%	9,301	8,775	-2.38%	-11.31%	-13.55%
Hidalgo	Texas	91.87%	870,781	800,001	90.63%	774,769	702,206	1.24%	12.39%	13.93%
Cameron	Texas	89.47%	421,017	376,680	88.07%	406,220	357,747	1.40%	3.64%	5.29%
Culebra	Puerto Rico	89.23%	1,792	1,599	91.75%	1,818	1,668	-2.52%	-1.43%	-4.14%
Jim Hogg	Texas	88.49%	4,838	4,281	92.58%	5,300	4,907	-4.10%	-8.72%	-12.76%
Brooks	Texas	88.21%	7,076	6,242	91.24%	7,223	6,590	-3.02%	-2.04%	-5.28%
Willacy	Texas	87.34%	20,164	17,611	87.18%	22,134	19,297	0.16%	-8.90%	-8.74%
Dimmit	Texas	86.91%	8,615	7,487	86.19%	9,996	8,616	0.71%	-13.82%	-13.10%
Imperial	California	85.16%	179,702	153,027	80.37%	174,528	140,271	4.78%	2.96%	9.09%
Reeves	Texas	84.83%	14,748	12,510	74.24%	13,783	10,233	10.58%	7.00%	22.25%
Santa Cruz	Arizona	83.14%	47,669	39,632	82.82%	47,420	39,273	0.32%	0.53%	0.91%
El Paso	Texas	82.64%	865,657	715,351	82.20%	800,647	658,134	0.44%	8.12%	8.69%
Presidio	Texas	81.41%	6,131	4,991	83.41%	7,818	6,521	-2.00%	-21.58%	-23.46%
Duval	Texas	80.99%	9,831	7,962	88.47%	11,782	10,424	-7.49%	-16.56%	-23.62%
Val Verde	Texas	80.29%	47,586	38,207	80.20%	48,879	39,199	0.09%	-2.65%	-2.53%
Jim Wells	Texas	79.29%	38,891	30,835	78.98%	40,838	32,254	0.31%	-4.77%	-4.40%
Mora	New Mexico	78.80%	4,189	3,301	80.99%	4,881	3,953	-2.19%	-14.18%	-16.49%
Guadalupe	New Mexico	77.18%	4,452	3,436	79.58%	4,687	3,730	-2.40%	-5.01%	-7.88%
Frio	Texas	77.08%	18,385	14,171	77.84%	17,217	13,401	-0.76%	6.78%	5.75%
San Miguel	New Mexico	75.33%	27,201	20,490	76.83%	29,393	22,583	-1.50%	-7.46%	-9.27%
Culberson	Texas	75.18%	2,188	1,645	76.19%	2,398	1,827	-1.01%	-8.76%	-9.96%
Deaf Smith	Texas	74.93%	18,583	13,925	67.31%	19,372	13,039	7.63%	-4.07%	6.79%
Kenedy	Texas	74.57%	350	261	76.68%	416	319	-2.11%	-15.87%	-18.18%
La Salle	Texas	73.65%	6,664	4,908	85.97%	6,886	5,920	-12.32%	-3.22%	-17.09%
Pecos	Texas	71.38%	15,193	10,845	67.26%	15,507	10,430	4.12%	-2.02%	3.98%
Kleberg	Texas	70.62%	31,040	21,920	70.16%	32,061	22,495	0.46%	-3.18%	-2.56%
Uvalde	Texas	70.50%	24,564	17,317	69.30%	26,405	18,299	1.20%	-6.97%	-5.37%
Miami-Dade	Florida	68.73%	2,701,767	1,856,938	65.05%	2,496,435	1,623,859	3.68%	8.23%	14.35%
Crane	Texas	67.55%	4,675	3,158	55.06%	4,375	2,409	12.49%	6.86%	31.09%
Reagan	Texas	67.44%	3,385	2,283	60.91%	3,367	2,051	6.53%	0.53%	11.31%
Rio Arriba	New Mexico	67.29%	40,363	27,159	71.32%	40,246	28,703	-4.03%	0.29%	-5.38%
Doña Ana	New Mexico	67.26%	219,561	147,672	65.72%	209,233	137,514	1.53%	4.94%	7.39%
Parmer	Texas	65.90%	9,869	6,504	60.03%	10,269	6,164	5.88%	-3.90%	5.52%
Bailey	Texas	65.76%	6,904	4,540	59.78%	7,165	4,283	5.98%	-3.64%	6.00%
Seward	Kansas	65.59%	21,964	14,406	56.60%	22,952	12,990	8.99%	-4.30%	10.90%
Luna	New Mexico	65.56%	25,427	16,670	61.46%	25,095	15,423	4.10%	1.32%	8.09%
Tulare	California	65.50%	473,117	309,895	60.62%	442,179	268,065	4.88%	7.00%	15.60%
Castro	Texas	64.90%	7,371	4,784	59.89%	8,062	4,828	5.02%	-8.57%	-0.91%
Yoakum	Texas	64.57%	7,694	4,968	58.66%	7,879	4,622	5.91%	-2.35%	7.49%
Yuma	Arizona	63.76%	203,881	130,003	59.72%	195,751	116,912	4.04%	4.15%	11.20%
Atascosa	Texas	63.65%	48,981	31,178	61.87%	44,911	27,785	1.79%	9.06%	12.21%
Adams	Washington	63.65%	20,613	13,120	59.26%	18,728	11,099	4.38%	10.07%	18.21%
Hudspeth	Texas	63.59%	3,202	2,036	79.63%	3,476	2,768	-16.05%	-7.88%	-26.45%
Bee	Texas	62.46%	31,047	19,392	56.20%	31,861	17,906	6.26%	-2.55%	8.30%
Sutton	Texas	62.07%	3,372	2,093	59.57%	4,128	2,459	2.50%	-18.31%	-14.88%
Crockett	Texas	61.98%	3,098	1,920	63.24%	3,719	2,352	-1.27%	-16.70%	-18.37%
Merced	California	61.83%	281,202	173,857	54.92%	255,793	140,485	6.91%	9.93%	23.75%
Colusa	California	61.71%	21,839	13,476	55.11%	21,419	11,804	6.60%	1.96%	14.16%
Nueces	Texas	61.46%	353,178	217,052	60.63%	340,223	206,293	0.82%	3.81%	5.22%
San Benito	California	61.11%	64,209	39,241	56.43%	55,269	31,186	4.69%	16.18%	25.83%
Winkler	Texas	60.74%	7,791	4,732	53.78%	7,110	3,824	6.95%	9.58%	23.74%
Lea	New Mexico	60.70%	74,455	45,193	51.08%	64,727	33,063	9.62%	15.03%	36.69%
Ector	Texas	60.57%	165,171	100,051	52.75%	137,130	72,331	7.83%	20.45%	38.32%
Monterey	California	60.43%	439,035	265,321	55.41%	415,057	230,003	5.02%	5.78%	15.36%
Valencia	New Mexico	60.07%	76,205	45,775	58.25%	76,569	44,605	1.81%	-0.48%	2.62%
Cochran	Texas	59.95%	2,547	1,527	52.89%	3,127	1,654	7.06%	-18.55%	-7.68%
Hale	Texas	59.93%	32,522	19,489	55.88%	36,273	20,269	4.05%	-10.34%	-3.85%
Madera	California	59.63%	156,255	93,178	53.69%	150,865	80,992	5.95%	3.57%	15.05%
Bexar	Texas	59.27%	2,009,324	1,190,958	58.72%	1,714,773	1,006,958	0.55%	17.18%	18.27%
Moore	Texas	59.21%	21,358	12,647	52.69%	21,904	11,542	6.52%	-2.49%	9.57%
Ford	Kansas	57.36%	34,287	19,666	51.17%	33,848	17,321	6.18%	1.30%	13.54%
Hidalgo	New Mexico	57.20%	4,178	2,390	56.58%	4,894	2,769	0.62%	-14.63%	-13.69%
Lamb	Texas	57.10%	13,045	7,449	51.73%	13,977	7,231	5.37%	-6.67%	3.01%
Chaves	New Mexico	56.93%	65,157	37,097	52.01%	65,645	34,139	4.93%	-0.74%	8.66%
Costilla	Colorado	56.82%	3,499	1,988	66.03%	3,524	2,327	-9.22%	-0.71%	-14.57%
Kings	California	56.80%	152,486	86,607	50.90%	152,982	77,866	5.90%	-0.32%	11.23%
Floyd	Texas	56.78%	5,402	3,067	52.90%	6,446	3,410	3.87%	-16.20%	-10.06%
Garza	Texas	56.26%	5,816	3,272	47.14%	6,461	3,046	9.11%	-9.98%	7.42%
Andrews	Texas	55.88%	18,610	10,400	48.66%	14,786	7,195	7.22%	25.86%	44.54%
Hendry	Florida	55.81%	39,619	22,112	49.16%	39,140	19,243	6.65%	1.22%	14.91%
San Patricio	Texas	55.59%	68,755	38,220	54.39%	64,804	35,248	1.20%	6.10%	8.43%
Terry	Texas	55.52%	11,831	6,569	49.09%	12,651	6,211	6.43%	-6.48%	5.76%
Caldwell	Texas	55.51%	45,883	25,468	47.08%	38,066	17,922	8.43%	20.54%	42.10%
Crosby	Texas	55.11%	5,133	2,829	52.34%	6,059	3,171	2.78%	-15.28%	-10.79%
Kern	California	54.90%	909,235	499,158	49.19%	839,631	413,033	5.71%	8.29%	20.85%
Bronx	New York	54.76%	1,472,654	806,463	53.53%	1,385,108	741,413	1.24%	6.32%	8.77%
Ochiltree	Texas	54.62%	10,015	5,470	48.73%	10,223	4,982	5.88%	-2.03%	9.80%
Dawson	Texas	54.33%	12,456	6,767	53.40%	13,833	7,387	0.93%	-9.95%	-8.39%
Upton	Texas	54.32%	3,308	1,797	49.00%	3,355	1,644	5.32%	-1.40%	9.31%
Ward	Texas	54.32%	11,644	6,325	47.61%	10,658	5,074	6.71%	9.25%	24.66%
Osceola	Florida	54.31%	388,656	211,089	45.46%	268,685	122,146	8.85%	44.65%	72.82%
Franklin	Washington	54.21%	96,749	52,445	51.18%	78,163	40,004	3.03%	23.78%	31.10%
San Bernardino	California	53.67%	2,181,654	1,170,913	49.19%	2,035,210	1,001,145	4.48%	7.20%	16.96%
Fresno	California	53.61%	1,008,654	540,743	50.31%	930,450	468,070	3.30%	8.40%	15.53%
Karnes	Texas	52.58%	14,710	7,734	49.76%	14,824	7,376	2.82%	-0.77%	4.85%
Grant	Kansas	52.53%	7,352	3,862	43.93%	7,829	3,439	8.60%	-6.09%	12.30%
Dallam	Texas	52.10%	7,115	3,707	40.53%	6,703	2,717	11.57%	6.15%	36.44%
Schleicher	Texas	52.02%	2,451	1,275	44.38%	3,461	1,536	7.64%	-29.18%	-16.99%
Finney	Kansas	51.68%	38,470	19,883	46.72%	36,776	17,182	4.96%	4.61%	15.72%
Yakima	Washington	50.66%	256,728	130,049	45.01%	243,231	109,470	5.65%	5.55%	18.80%
Conejos	Colorado	50.65%	7,461	3,779	55.96%	8,256	4,620	-5.31%	-9.63%	-18.20%
Texas	Oklahoma	50.61%	21,384	10,823	41.95%	20,640	8,659	8.66%	3.60%	24.99%
Taos	New Mexico	50.54%	34,489	17,430	55.81%	32,937	18,381	-5.27%	4.71%	-5.17%
Edwards	Texas	50.49%	1,422	718	51.30%	2,002	1,027	-0.81%	-28.97%	-30.09%
Gonzales	Texas	50.36%	19,653	9,897	47.22%	19,807	9,353	3.14%	-0.78%	5.82%
Socorro	New Mexico	50.33%	16,595	8,353	48.49%	17,866	8,664	1.84%	-7.11%	-3.59%
Eddy	New Mexico	50.24%	62,314	31,307	44.09%	53,829	23,731	6.15%	15.76%	31.92%
Medina	Texas	50.16%	50,748	25,455	49.71%	46,006	22,871	0.45%	10.31%	11.30%

== See also ==
- Hispanic and Latino Americans
  - List of U.S. states by Hispanic and Latino population
  - List of U.S. cities with large Hispanic and Latino populations
- List of U.S. counties with African-American majority populations
