= List of U.S. cities with large Hispanic populations =

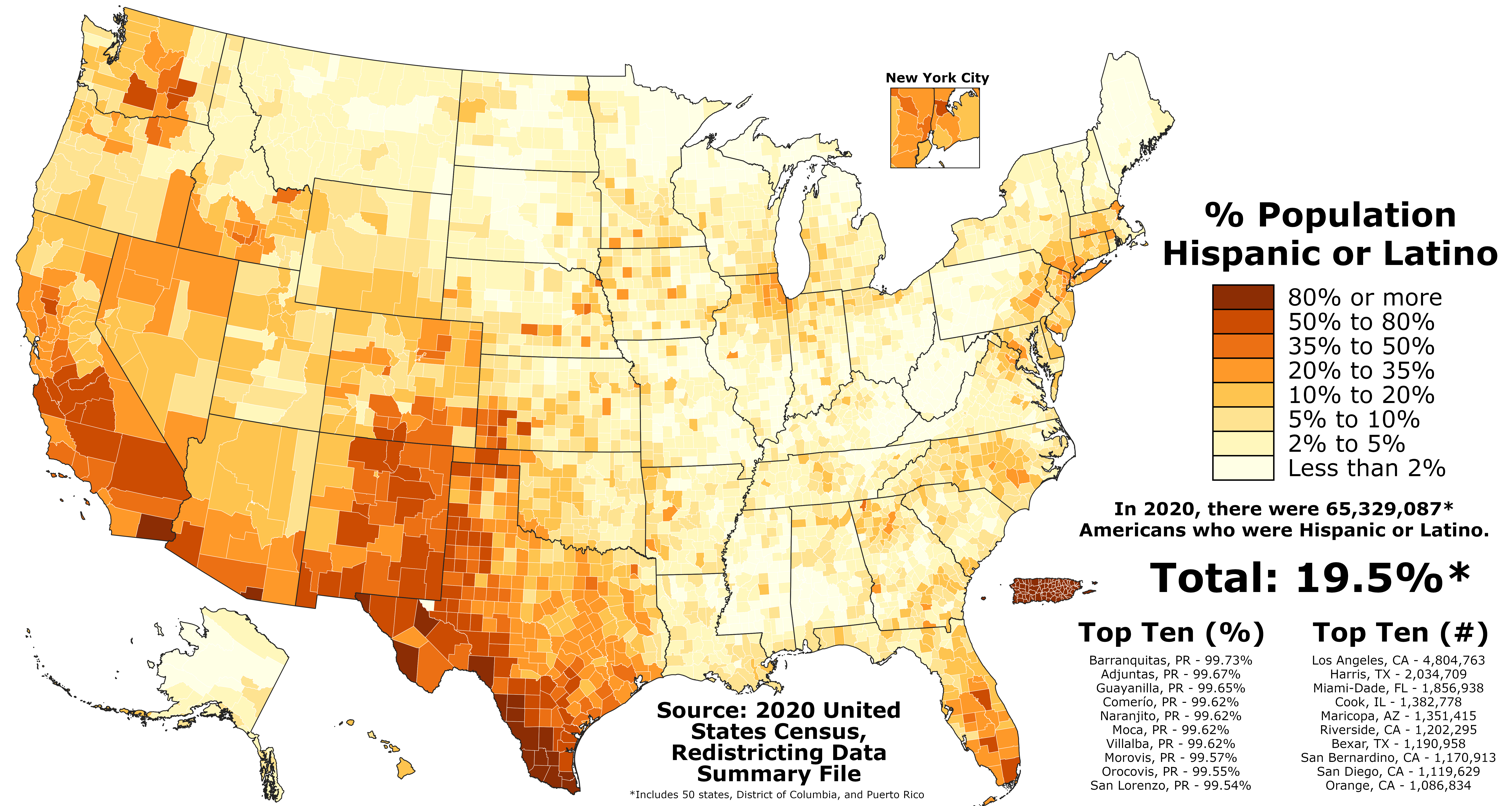
Proportion of Hispanic and Latino Americans in each county of the fifty states, the District of Columbia, and Puerto Rico as of the 2020 United States Census

This list of U.S. cities by American Hispanic and Latino population covers all incorporated cities and Census-designated places with a population over 100,000 and a proportion of Hispanic and Latino residents over 30% in the 50 U.S. states, the District of Columbia, and the territory of Puerto Rico and the population in each city that is either Hispanic or Latino.

The data source for the list is the 2020 United States Census.

Overall, at the time of the 2020 Census, there were 65.3 million Americans who were Hispanic or Latino, making up 19.5% of the U.S. population. State by state, the highest number of Hispanic Americans could be found in California (15.6 million), Texas (11.4 million), Florida (5.7 million), the state of New York (4.0 million), and Puerto Rico (3.3 million). Meanwhile, the highest proportions of Hispanic Americans were in Puerto Rico (99.1%), New Mexico (47.8%), California (39.4%), Texas (39.4%), and Arizona (30.8%).

Throughout the country, there were 343 cities with a population over 100,000. Hispanic majorities existed in 48 of them, and in 74 more cities, between 30% and 50% of the population identified as Hispanic. Out of the 48 majority-Hispanic cities, 27 were in California, 9 were in Texas, and 5 were in Puerto Rico. Florida and New Jersey had two each, while New Mexico, Nevada, Arizona, Oklahoma, and Pennsylvania all had one.

In 2020, the largest cities which had a Hispanic majority were San Antonio, Texas (1,430,000), El Paso, Texas (679,000), Fresno, California (542,000), Miami, Florida (442,000), and Bakersfield, California (403,000).

== List ==
The list below consists of each city (or city-equivalent) in the fifty states, the District of Columbia, and Puerto Rico with a population over 100,000 and a Hispanic proportion over 30% as of the 2020 Census. It includes the city's total population, the number of Hispanic people in the city, and the percentage of people in the city who are Hispanic. The table is initially sorted by the Hispanic proportion of each city but is sortable by any of its columns, as can be found by clicking the table headers.

Municipalities in Puerto Rico have their rows shaded in yellow

Census-Designated Places have their rows shaded in green

City	Region	Hispanic %	Population	Hispanic population
Caguas	Puerto Rico	99.24%	127,245	126,270
Ponce	Puerto Rico	99.14%	137,491	136,300
Bayamón	Puerto Rico	98.97%	185,187	183,263
Carolina	Puerto Rico	98.46%	154,815	152,417
San Juan	Puerto Rico	97.77%	342,259	334,601
East Los Angeles	California	95.17%	118,786	113,037
Laredo	Texas	95.15%	255,205	242,818
South Gate	California	94.95%	92,726	88,040
Hialeah	Florida	94.03%	223,109	209,784
Brownsville	Texas	93.88%	186,738	175,310
Edinburg	Texas	88.44%	100,243	88,658
McAllen	Texas	86.67%	142,210	123,250
El Paso	Texas	81.25%	678,815	551,513
Salinas	California	79.60%	163,542	130,178
Santa Ana	California	76.73%	310,227	238,022
Santa Maria	California	76.54%	109,707	83,968
Downey	California	75.09%	114,355	85,866
Oxnard	California	74.72%	202,063	150,984
Rialto	California	74.35%	104,026	77,345
Norwalk	California	71.56%	102,773	73,548
Pomona	California	71.22%	151,713	108,044
Jurupa Valley	California	70.49%	105,053	74,047
Miami	Florida	70.20%	442,241	310,472
Ontario	California	68.43%	175,265	119,928
San Bernardino	California	68.04%	222,101	151,125
Pasadena	Texas	67.81%	151,950	103,037
Fontana	California	67.79%	208,393	141,269
Elizabeth	New Jersey	65.72%	137,298	90,233
El Monte	California	64.70%	109,450	70,819
San Antonio	Texas	63.85%	1,434,625	916,010
Paterson	New Jersey	61.89%	159,732	98,863
Palmdale	California	61.81%	169,450	104,742
Moreno Valley	California	61.43%	208,634	128,168
Corpus Christi	Texas	60.71%	317,863	192,990
Hesperia	California	60.60%	100,744	61,051
Las Cruces	New Mexico	60.33%	111,385	67,204
Chula Vista	California	59.78%	275,487	164,698
Merced	California	56.32%	86,333	48,617
Odessa	Texas	56.14%	114,428	64,244
Victorville	California	55.44%	134,810	74,745
Riverside	California	54.73%	314,998	172,386
Sunrise Manor	Nevada	54.57%	205,618	112,208
Allentown	Pennsylvania	54.22%	125,845	68,232
Anaheim	California	53.82%	346,824	186,651
West Covina	California	53.06%	109,501	58,102
Bakersfield	California	52.75%	403,455	212,822
Visalia	California	52.75%	141,384	74,575
Escondido	California	51.79%	151,038	78,226
Inglewood	California	51.67%	107,762	55,677
Fresno	California	50.50%	542,107	273,771
Pembroke Pines	Florida	49.73%	171,178	85,133
Pueblo	Colorado	49.28%	111,876	55,133
Yakima	Washington	48.46%	96,968	46,990
Albuquerque	New Mexico	47.69%	564,559	269,238
Elgin	Illinois	47.44%	114,797	54,460
Los Angeles	California	46.94%	3,898,747	1,829,991
Springfield	Massachusetts	46.74%	155,929	72,874
Corona	California	46.52%	157,136	73,102
Grand Prairie	Texas	45.26%	196,100	88,749
Lancaster	California	45.15%	173,516	78,338
Richmond	California	44.58%	116,448	51,912
Lehigh Acres	Florida	44.43%	114,287	50,772
Mesquite	Texas	44.15%	150,108	66,272
Stockton	California	44.14%	320,804	141,601
Hartford	Connecticut	44.04%	121,054	53,315
Lynn	Massachusetts	44.01%	101,253	44,560
Houston	Texas	43.97%	2,304,580	1,013,423
Providence	Rhode Island	43.90%	190,934	83,815
Long Beach	California	43.28%	466,742	201,997
Modesto	California	42.91%	218,464	93,733
Garland	Texas	42.66%	246,018	104,945
Bridgeport	Connecticut	42.28%	148,654	62,853
Dallas	Texas	42.26%	1,304,379	551,174
Tucson	Arizona	42.18%	542,629	228,878
Yonkers	New York	42.10%	211,569	89,065
Rio Rancho	New Mexico	41.65%	104,046	43,334
Midland	Texas	41.62%	132,524	55,161
Aurora	Illinois	41.53%	180,542	74,981
Hayward	California	41.16%	162,954	67,079
Orange	California	41.15%	139,911	57,575
Phoenix	Arizona	41.14%	1,608,139	661,574
Irving	Texas	41.09%	256,684	105,469
Miramar	Florida	41.08%	134,721	55,337
North Las Vegas	Nevada	40.73%	262,527	106,940
Greeley	Colorado	40.22%	108,795	43,758
Hollywood	Florida	39.87%	153,067	61,031
Waterbury	Connecticut	39.58%	114,403	45,281
Davie	Florida	39.52%	105,691	41,769
West Valley City	Utah	39.42%	140,230	55,278
Glendale	Arizona	39.31%	248,325	97,617
Menifee	California	37.79%	102,527	38,749
Fullerton	California	37.76%	143,617	54,225
Rancho Cucamonga	California	37.41%	174,453	65,261
Garden Grove	California	37.28%	171,949	64,102
Costa Mesa	California	36.45%	111,918	40,795
Antioch	California	36.40%	115,291	41,965
Newark	New Jersey	36.39%	311,549	113,374
Oceanside	California	36.37%	174,068	63,316
Thornton	Colorado	36.23%	141,867	51,392
Lubbock	Texas	35.60%	257,141	91,545
Ventura	California	35.12%	110,763	38,902
Fort Worth	Texas	34.81%	918,915	319,836
Kansas City	Kansas	34.57%	156,607	54,144
Santa Clarita	California	34.43%	228,673	78,735
Santa Rosa	California	34.29%	178,127	61,082
Joliet	Illinois	33.59%	150,362	50,510
Paradise	Nevada	33.53%	191,238	64,116
Las Vegas	Nevada	33.31%	641,903	213,828
Pasadena	California	32.98%	138,699	45,742
Miami Gardens	Florida	32.88%	111,640	36,711
Orlando	Florida	32.86%	307,573	101,061
Amarillo	Texas	32.59%	200,393	65,302
Austin	Texas	32.48%	961,855	312,448
Lewisville	Texas	32.06%	111,822	35,853
Carrollton	Texas	31.68%	133,434	42,272
Waco	Texas	31.67%	138,486	43,857
San Jose	California	31.21%	1,013,240	316,266
Concord	California	31.06%	125,410	38,953
Arlington	Texas	30.68%	394,266	120,944
New Haven	Connecticut	30.64%	134,023	41,068
Fairfield	California	30.63%	119,881	36,723
Murrieta	California	30.58%	110,949	33,925
Clovis	California	30.46%	120,124	36,594
Aurora	Colorado	30.27%	386,261	116,902
Sparks	Nevada	30.13%	108,445	32,670
Chicago	Illinois	30.00%	2,746,388	823,916

== See also ==
- Hispanic and Latino Americans
  - List of U.S. states by Hispanic and Latino population
  - List of majority-Hispanic or Latino counties in the United States
- List of U.S. cities with large Black populations
- List of U.S. communities with Asian-American majority populations
