= List of U.S. cities with non-Hispanic white plurality populations in 2010 =

This is a list of U.S. cities where non-Hispanic whites formed less than half the population in the 2010 census, but no other ethnic or racial group had more people than non-Hispanic whites. The percentage listed is the percentage of the population that was non-Hispanic whites.

== Cities ==
=== California ===
- Antioch, California - 35.6%
- Cypress, California -43.6%
- Dixon, California - 49.3%
- El Cerrito, California - 48.3%
- Fairfield, California - 35.2%
- Fountain Valley, California - 49.2%
- Vallejo, California - 25.0%
- Suisun City, California - 29.2

=== Maryland ===
- Cambridge, Maryland - 42.7%
- Gaithersburg, Maryland - 40.0%
- Salisbury, Maryland - 49.0%
- Takoma Park, Maryland - 43.3%

=== Massachusetts ===
- Boston, Massachusetts - 47.0%

=== Michigan ===
- Harper Woods, Michigan - 48.5%

=== Missouri ===
- Grandview, Missouri - 45.0%

=== Nevada ===
- Las Vegas, Nevada - 47.9%
- North Las Vegas, Nevada - 31.2

=== Virginia ===
- Newport News, Virginia - 46.0%

== Census Designated Places ==
=== Maryland ===
- Aspen Hill, Maryland - 34.0%
- Cloverly, Maryland - 40.5%
- Colesville, Maryland - 35.2%
- Columbia, Maryland - 49.0%
- Hillandale, Maryland - 35.8%
- Reisterstown, Maryland - 48.5%

=== Nevada ===
- Paradise, Nevada - 46.3%
- Spring Valley, Nevada - 48.1%
- Whitney, Nevada - 38.4%
