= List of U.S. states by Hispanic and Latino population =

Hispanic and Latino American demographics by U.S. state

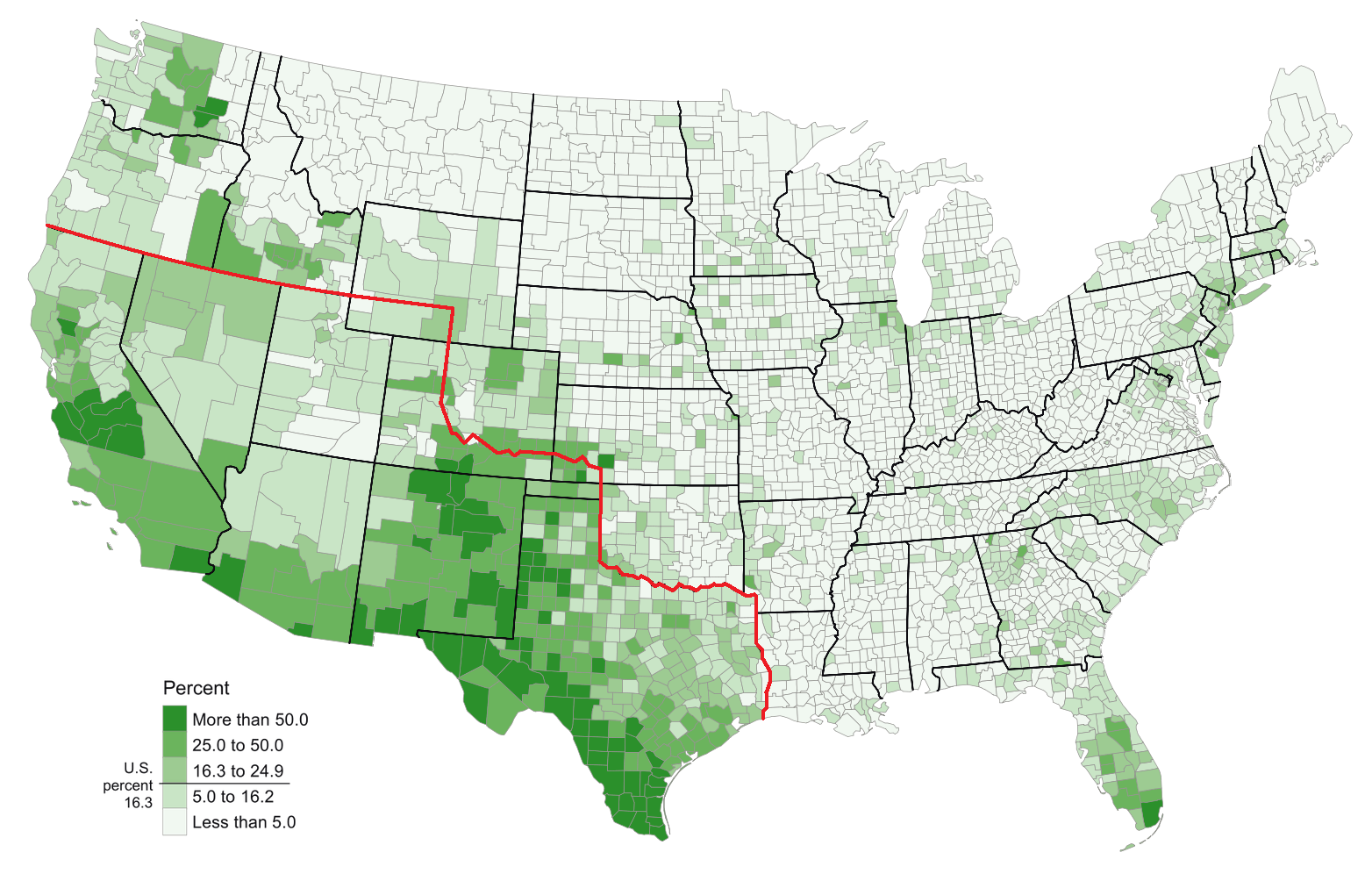
The Hispanic and Latino American proportion of population in the United States in 2010 overlaid with the Mexican–American border of 1836

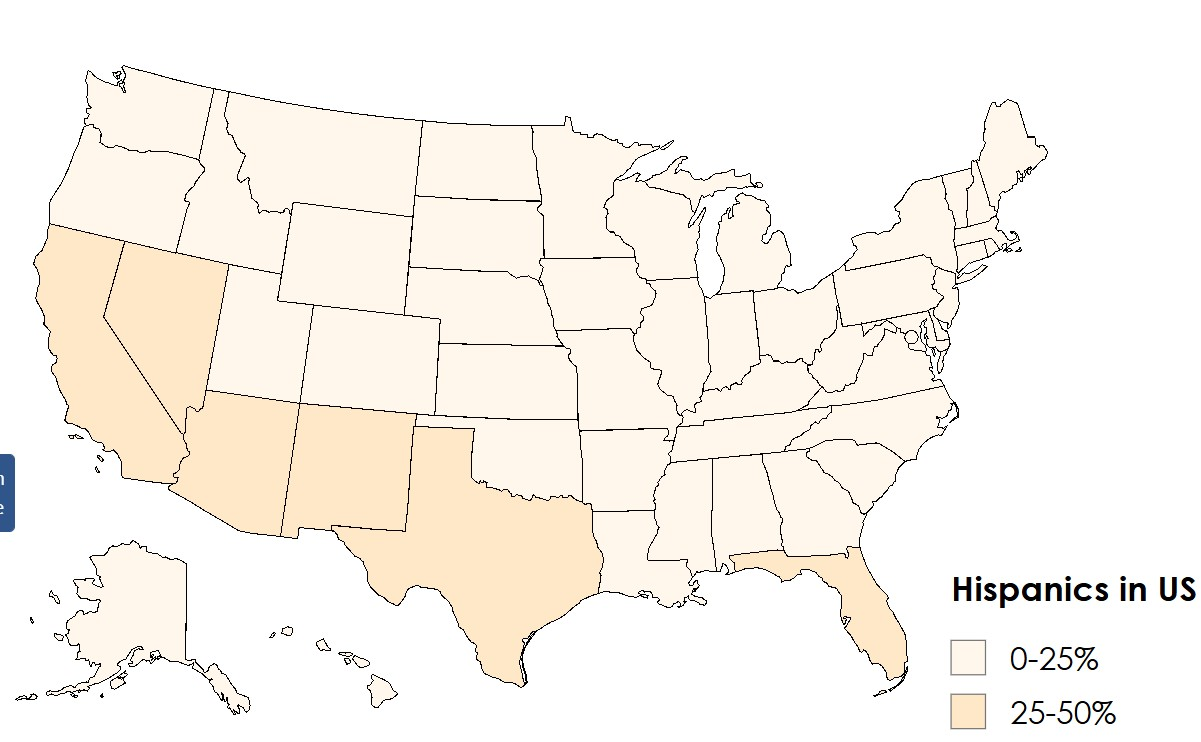
Proportion of Americans who are Hispanic or Latino in each U.S. state, the District of Columbia, and Puerto Rico as of the 2020 United States Census

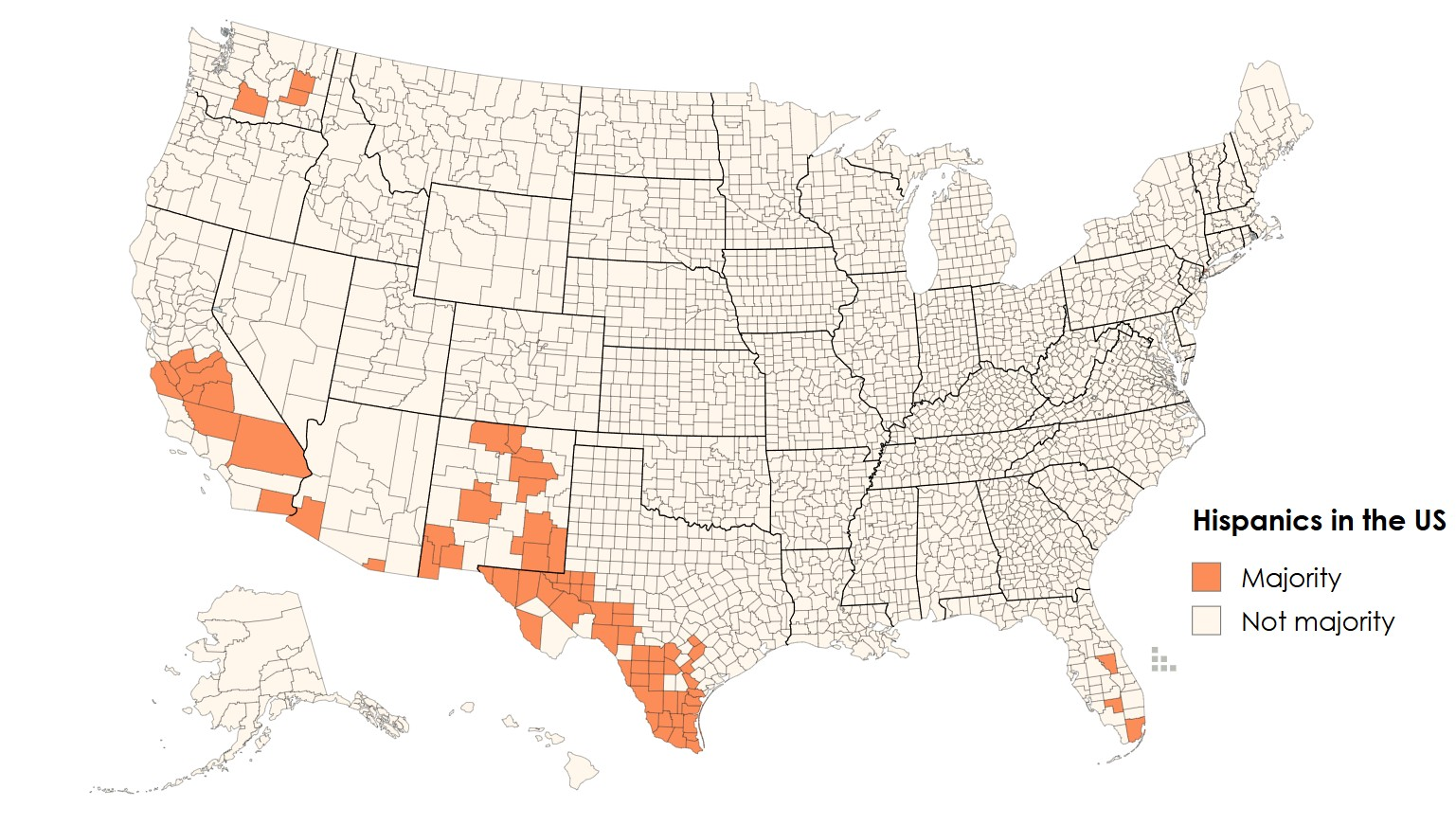
Proportion of Hispanic and Latino Americans in each county of the fifty states, the District of Columbia, and Puerto Rico as of the 2020 United States Census

As of 2020, Hispanics and Latinos make up 18.7% of the total U.S. population (approximately 62 million out of a total of around 330 million). The state with the largest percentage of Hispanics and Latinos is New Mexico at 47.7%. The state with the largest Hispanic and Latino population overall is California with 15.6 million Hispanics and Latinos. Hispanics are the largest racial or ethnic group in both states and is expected to become the largest in Texas in the 2020s.

The following are lists of the Hispanic and Latino population per state in the United States.

== 2000–20 US Census results ==
Hispanic and Latino Population by state or territory (2000–2020)
| State/Territory | Numbers | | | Per cent | | | % growth | |
| State/Territory | 2000 | 2010 | 2020 | 2000 | 2010 | 2020 | 2000–2010 | 2010–2020 |
|---|---|---|---|---|---|---|---|---|
| Alabama | 75,830 | 185,602 | 264,047 | 1.7% | 3.9% | 5.3% | +144.8% | +42.3% |
| Alaska | 25,852 | 39,250 | 49,824 | 4.1% | 5.5% | 6.8% | +51.8% | +26.9% |
| Arizona | 1,295,617 | 1,895,149 | 2,192,253 | 25.3% | 29.6% | 30.7% | +46.3% | +15.7% |
| Arkansas | 86,866 | 186,050 | 256,847 | 3.2% | 6.4% | 8.5% | +114.2% | +38.1% |
| California | 10,966,556 | 14,013,719 | 15,579,652 | 32.4% | 37.6% | 39.4% | +27.8% | +11.2% |
| Colorado | 735,801 | 1,038,687 | 1,263,390 | 17.1% | 20.7% | 21.9% | +41.2% | +21.6% |
| Connecticut | 320,323 | 479,087 | 623,293 | 9.4% | 13.4% | 17.3% | +49.6% | +30.1% |
| Delaware | 37,277 | 73,221 | 104,290 | 4.8% | 8.2% | 10.5% | +96.4% | +42.4% |
| (Washington, D.C.) District of Columbia | 44,953 | 54,749 | 77,652 | 7.9% | 9.1% | 11.3% | +21.8% | +41.8% |
| Florida | 2,682,715 | 4,223,806 | 5,697,240 | 16.8% | 22.5% | 26.5% | +57.4% | +34.9% |
| (Georgia (U.S. state)) Georgia | 435,227 | 853,689 | 1,123,457 | 5.3% | 8.8% | 10.5% | +96.1% | +31.6% |
| Hawaii | 87,699 | 120,842 | 138,923 | 7.2% | 8.9% | 9.5% | +37.8% | +14.4% |
| Idaho | 101,690 | 175,901 | 239,407 | 7.9% | 11.2% | 13.0% | +73.0% | +36.1% |
| Illinois | 1,530,262 | 2,027,578 | 2,337,410 | 12.3% | 15.8% | 18.2% | +32.5% | +15.3% |
| Indiana | 214,536 | 389,707 | 554,191 | 3.5% | 6.0% | 8.2% | +81.7% | +42.2% |
| Iowa | 82,473 | 151,544 | 215,986 | 2.8% | 5.0% | 6.8% | +83.7% | +42.5% |
| Kansas | 188,252 | 300,042 | 382,603 | 7.0% | 10.5% | 13.0% | +59.4% | +27.5% |
| Kentucky | 59,939 | 132,836 | 207,854 | 1.5% | 3.1% | 4.6% | +121.6% | +56.5% |
| Louisiana | 107,738 | 192,560 | 322,549 | 2.4% | 4.2% | 6.2% | +78.7% | +67.5% |
| Maine | 9,360 | 16,935 | 26,609 | 0.7% | 1.3% | 2.0% | +80.9% | +57.1% |
| Maryland | 227,916 | 470,632 | 729,745 | 4.3% | 8.2% | 11.8% | +106.5% | +55.1% |
| Massachusetts | 428,729 | 627,654 | 887,685 | 6.8% | 9.6% | 12.6% | +46.4% | +41.4% |
| Michigan | 323,877 | 436,358 | 564,422 | 3.3% | 4.4% | 5.6% | +34.7% | +29.3% |
| Minnesota | 143,382 | 250,258 | 345,640 | 2.9% | 4.7% | 6.1% | +74.5% | +38.1% |
| Mississippi | 39,569 | 81,481 | 105,220 | 1.4% | 2.7% | 3.6% | +105.9% | +29.1% |
| Missouri | 118,592 | 212,470 | 303,068 | 2.1% | 3.5% | 4.9% | +79.2% | +42.6% |
| Montana | 18,081 | 28,565 | 45,199 | 2.0% | 2.9% | 4.2% | +58.0% | +58.2% |
| Nebraska | 94,425 | 167,405 | 234,715 | 5.5% | 9.2% | 12.0% | +77.3% | +40.2% |
| Nevada | 393,970 | 716,501 | 890,257 | 19.7% | 26.5% | 28.7% | +81.9% | +24.3% |
| New Hampshire | 20,489 | 36,704 | 59,454 | 1.7% | 2.8% | 4.3% | +79.1% | +62.0% |
| New Jersey | 1,117,191 | 1,555,144 | 2,002,575 | 13.3% | 17.7% | 21.6% | +39.2% | +28.8% |
| New Mexico | 765,386 | 953,403 | 1,010,811 | 42.1% | 46.3% | 47.7% | +24.6% | +6.0% |
| (New York (state)) New York | 2,867,583 | 3,402,997 | 3,948,032 | 15.1% | 17.6% | 19.5% | +19.2% | +16.0% |
| North Carolina | 378,963 | 800,120 | 1,118,596 | 4.7% | 8.4% | 10.7% | +111.1% | +39.8% |
| North Dakota | 7,786 | 13,467 | 33,412 | 1.2% | 2.0% | 4.3% | +73.0% | +148.1% |
| Ohio | 217,123 | 354,674 | 521,308 | 1.9% | 3.1% | 4.4% | +63.4% | +47.0% |
| Oklahoma | 179,304 | 332,007 | 471,931 | 5.2% | 8.9% | 11.9% | +85.2% | +42.1% |
| Oregon | 275,314 | 450,062 | 588,757 | 8.0% | 11.7% | 13.9% | +63.5% | +30.8% |
| Pennsylvania | 394,088 | 719,660 | 1,049,615 | 3.2% | 5.7% | 8.1% | +82.6% | +45.8% |
| Rhode Island | 90,820 | 130,655 | 182,101 | 8.7% | 12.4% | 16.6% | +43.9% | +39.4% |
| South Carolina | 95,076 | 235,682 | 352,838 | 2.4% | 5.1% | 6.9% | +147.9% | +49.7% |
| South Dakota | 10,903 | 22,119 | 38,741 | 1.4% | 2.7% | 4.4% | +102.9% | +75.1% |
| Tennessee | 123,838 | 290,059 | 479,187 | 2.2% | 4.6% | 6.9% | +134.2% | +65.2% |
| Texas | 6,669,666 | 9,460,921 | 11,441,717 | 32.0% | 37.6% | 39.3% | +41.8% | +20.9% |
| Utah | 201,559 | 358,340 | 492,912 | 9.0% | 13.0% | 15.1% | +77.8% | +37.6% |
| Vermont | 5,504 | 9,208 | 15,504 | 0.9% | 1.5% | 2.4% | +67.3% | +68.4% |
| Virginia | 329,540 | 631,825 | 908,749 | 4.7% | 7.9% | 10.5% | +91.7% | +43.8% |
| (Washington (state)) Washington | 441,509 | 755,790 | 1,059,213 | 7.5% | 11.2% | 13.7% | +71.2% | +40.1% |
| West Virginia | 12,279 | 22,268 | 34,827 | 0.7% | 1.2% | 1.9% | +81.4% | +56.4% |
| Wisconsin | 192,921 | 336,056 | 447,290 | 3.6% | 5.9% | 7.6% | +74.2% | +33.1% |
| Wyoming | 31,669 | 50,231 | 59,046 | 6.4% | 8.9% | 10.2% | +58.6% | +17.5% |
| American Samoa | | 109 | 406 | | 0.2% | | | |
| Guam | | 2,124 | 4,522 | | 1.4% | 2.4% | | |
| Northern Mariana Islands | | 117 | 554 | | 0.2% | 1.2% | | |
| Puerto Rico | 3,762,746 | 3,688,455 | 3,249,043 | 98.8% | 99.0% | 98.9% | -2.0% | -11.9% |
| (United States Virgin Islands) U.S. Virgin Islands | 15,196 | 18,514 | 16,075 | 14.0% | 17.4% | 18.4% | | |
| United States of America | 35,305,818 | 50,477,594 | 65,329,087 | 12.5% | 16.3% | 19.5% | +43.0% | +23.0% |

In the 2010s, Hispanic population growth slowed down due to a massive decline in immigration from Latin America as well as a large decline in birth rates; Asians became the fastest growing demographic group. A much higher proportion of Hispanics choose mixed race rather than white in the 2020 census as compared to previous censuses. Hispanics accounted for 51.1% of population growth between 2010-2020 and 56% between 2000 and 2010.

The proportion of the population which is Hispanic increased at least slightly in every state. Growth was slowest in the states with large historical Mexican American and Hispano populations including New Mexico, California, Nevada, Arizona, Texas and Colorado where relative growth in population proportion was 5% or less compared to 15% nationally. Growth was highest in states which historically lacked a Hispanic population continuing the trend of intrastate migration for mostly lower wage jobs in the 21st century by Hispanics. These states include North Dakota, Tennessee, Vermont and Maine where relative growth in population proportion was over 50%. Pennsylvania, with a Hispanic population of 0.1% in 1940, saw a greater numeric increase in the Hispanic population than Arizona; with a Hispanic population of 20.4% in 1940.

=== Nationality breakdown ===
| | Total Hispanics | | Mexicans | | Puerto Ricans | |
| Subdivision | Quantity | % | Quantity | % | Quantity | % |
|---|---|---|---|---|---|---|
| Alabama | 264,047 | 5.3% | 148,193 | 2.9% | 21,512 | 0.4% |
| Alaska | 49,824 | 6.8% | 25,177 | 3.4% | 5,877 | 0.8% |
| Arizona | 2,192,253 | 30.7% | 1,842,769 | 25.7% | 49,229 | 0.6% |
| Arkansas | 256,847 | 8.5% | 171,732 | 5.6% | 9,158 | 0.3% |
| California | 15,579,652 | 39.4% | 12,202,347 | 30.8% | 213,303 | 0.5% |
| Colorado | 1,263,390 | 21.9% | 874,342 | 15.1% | 37,899 | 0.6% |
| Connecticut | 623,293 | 17.3% | 59,453 | 1.6% | 288,344 | 8.0% |
| Delaware | 104,290 | 10.5% | 37,201 | 3.7% | 28,922 | 2.9% |
| District of Columbia | 77,652 | 11.3% | 13,263 | 1.9% | 4,848 | 0.7% |
| Florida | 5,697,240 | 26.5% | 707,301 | 3.2% | 1,153,880 | 5.3% |
| (Georgia (U.S. state)) Georgia | 1,123,457 | 10.5% | 570,149 | 5.3% | 109,009 | 1.0% |
| Hawaii | 138,923 | 9.5% | 42,941 | 2.9% | 46,229 | 3.1% |
| Idaho | 239,407 | 13.0% | 189,489 | 10.2% | 4,927 | 0.2% |
| Illinois | 2,337,410 | 18.2% | 1,768,747 | 13.8% | 196,156 | 1.5% |
| Indiana | 554,191 | 8.2% | 374,854 | 5.5% | 44,647 | 0.6% |
| Iowa | 215,986 | 6.8% | 148,097 | 4.6% | 9,461 | 0.2% |
| Kansas | 382,603 | 13.0% | 290,747 | 9.8% | 13,943 | 0.4% |
| Kentucky | 207,854 | 4.6% | 105,469 | 2.3% | 18,397 | 0.4% |
| Louisiana | 322,549 | 6.2% | 103,872 | 2.0% | 17,474 | 0.3% |
| Maine | 26,609 | 2.0% | 7,167 | 0.5% | 6,392 | 0.4% |
| Maryland | 729,745 | 11.8% | 112,886 | 1.8% | 58,180 | 0.9% |
| Massachusetts | 887,685 | 12.6% | 51,646 | 0.7% | 312,277 | 4.5% |
| Michigan | 564,422 | 5.6% | 381,337 | 3.7% | 50,209 | 0.4% |
| Minnesota | 345,640 | 6.1% | 214,435 | 3.7% | 17,509 | 0.3% |
| Mississippi | 105,220 | 3.6% | 56,688 | 1.9% | 9,790 | 0.3% |
| Missouri | 303,068 | 4.9% | 187,563 | 3.0% | 19,156 | 0.3% |
| Montana | 45,199 | 4.2% | 28,347 | 2.6% | 2,260 | 0.2% |
| Nebraska | 234,715 | 12.0% | 159,907 | 8.1% | 5,539 | 0.2% |
| Nevada | 890,257 | 28.7% | 629,558 | 20.2% | 29,383 | 0.9% |
| New Hampshire | 59,454 | 4.3% | 10,102 | 0.7% | 18,355 | 1.3% |
| New Jersey | 2,002,575 | 21.6% | 252,172 | 2.7% | 459,270 | 4.9% |
| New Mexico | 1,010,811 | 47.7% | 671,552 | 31.7% | 9,861 | 0.4% |
| New York | 3,948,032 | 19.5% | 496,747 | 2.4% | 1,000,764 | 5.0% |
| North Carolina | 1,118,596 | 10.7% | 563,929 | 5.3% | 114,917 | 1.1% |
| North Dakota | 33,412 | 4.3% | 21,195 | 2.7% | 3,035 | 0.3% |
| Ohio | 521,308 | 4.4% | 219,916 | 1.8% | 133,261 | 1.2% |
| Oklahoma | 471,931 | 11.9% | 353,908 | 8.9% | 17,891 | 0.4% |
| Oregon | 588,757 | 13.9% | 446,629 | 10.5% | 14,294 | 0.3% |
| Pennsylvania | 1,049,615 | 8.1% | 159,722 | 1.2% | 456,589 | 3.6% |
| Rhode Island | 182,101 | 16.6% | 11,317 | 1.0% | 40,762 | 3.8% |
| South Carolina | 352,838 | 6.9% | 164,506 | 3.2% | 46,021 | 0.8% |
| South Dakota | 38,741 | 4.4% | 20,450 | 2.3% | 3,430 | 0.3% |
| Tennessee | 479,187 | 6.9% | 256,113 | 3.6% | 36,208 | 0.5% |
| Texas | 11,441,717 | 39.3% | 9,031,289 | 30.9% | 230,462 | 0.7% |
| Utah | 492,912 | 15.1% | 326,430 | 10.0% | 11,716 | 0.3% |
| Vermont | 15,504 | 2.4% | 3,567 | 0.5% | 3,420 | 0.5% |
| Virginia | 908,749 | 10.5% | 197,511 | 2.2% | 104,845 | 1.3% |
| Washington | 1,059,213 | 13.7% | 783,668 | 10.1% | 39,313 | 0.5% |
| West Virginia | 34,827 | 1.9% | 12,539 | 0.6% | 5,881 | 0.3% |
| Wisconsin | 447,290 | 7.6% | 299,955 | 5.1% | 65,084 | 1.1% |
| Wyoming | 59,046 | 10.2% | 41,891 | 7.2% | 1,580 | 0.2% |
| Total US | 65,329,087 | 19.5% | 35,850,702 | 10.8% | 5,601,863 | 1.6% |

== Historic Hispanic/Latino population (1910–2020) ==
% of Population of Mexican Origin (1910–1930) and of Hispanic/Latino Origin (1940–2020) by U.S. State^{[a]}
| State/Territory | 1910 | 1920 | 1930 | 1940 | 1950 | 1960 | 1970 | 1980 | 1990 | 2000 | 2010 | 2020 |
|---|---|---|---|---|---|---|---|---|---|---|---|---|
| United States | 0.4% | 0.7% | 1.2% | 1.5% | 2.1% | 3.2% | 4.4% | 6.4% | 9.0% | 12.5% | 16.3% | 19.5% |
| Alabama | 0.0% | 0.0% | 0.0% | 0.0% | | | 0.4% | 0.9% | 0.6% | 1.7% | 3.9% | 5.3% |
| Alaska | | | | | | | 2.1% | 2.4% | 3.2% | 4.1% | 5.5% | 6.8% |
| Arizona | 28.6% | 30.4% | 30.2% | 20.4% | 17.2% | 14.9% | 17.3% | 16.2% | 18.8% | 25.3% | 29.6% | 30.7% |
| Arkansas | 0.0% | 0.0% | 0.0% | 0.0% | | | 0.5% | 0.8% | 0.8% | 3.2% | 6.4% | 8.5% |
| California | 2.1% | 3.7% | 6.8% | 6.0% | 7.2% | 9.1% | 13.7% | 19.2% | 25.8% | 32.4% | 37.6% | 39.4% |
| Colorado | 0.4% | 1.6% | 5.7% | 8.2% | 9.0% | 9.0% | 11.6% | 11.8% | 12.9% | 17.1% | 20.7% | 21.9% |
| Connecticut | 0.0% | 0.0% | 0.0% | 0.1% | | | 2.4% | 4.0% | 6.5% | 9.4% | 13.4% | 17.3% |
| Delaware | 0.0% | 0.0% | 0.0% | 0.1% | | | 1.1% | 1.6% | 2.4% | 4.8% | 8.2% | 10.5% |
| (Washington, D.C.) District of Columbia | 0.0% | 0.0% | 0.0% | 0.1% | | | 2.1% | 2.8% | 5.4% | 7.9% | 9.1% | 11.3% |
| Florida | 0.0% | 0.0% | 0.0% | 1.3% | | | 6.6% | 8.8% | 12.2% | 16.8% | 22.5% | 26.5% |
| (Georgia (U.S. state)) Georgia | 0.0% | 0.0% | 0.0% | 0.0% | | | 0.6% | 1.1% | 1.7% | 5.3% | 8.8% | 10.5% |
| Hawaii | | | | | | | 3.0% | 7.4% | 7.3% | 7.2% | 8.9% | 9.5% |
| Idaho | 0.0% | 0.3% | 0.3% | 0.5% | | | 2.6% | 3.9% | 5.3% | 7.9% | 11.2% | 13.0% |
| Illinois | 0.0% | 0.1% | 0.4% | 0.3% | | | 3.3% | 5.6% | 7.9% | 12.3% | 15.8% | 18.2% |
| Indiana | 0.0% | 0.0% | 0.3% | 0.2% | | | 1.3% | 1.6% | 1.8% | 3.5% | 6.0% | 8.2% |
| Iowa | 0.0% | 0.1% | 0.2% | 0.1% | | | 0.6% | 0.9% | 1.2% | 2.8% | 5.0% | 6.8% |
| Kansas | 0.5% | 0.9% | 1.1% | 0.7% | | | 2.1% | 2.7% | 3.8% | 7.0% | 10.5% | 13.0% |
| Kentucky | 0.0% | 0.0% | 0.0% | 0.0% | | | 0.3% | 0.7% | 0.6% | 1.5% | 3.1% | 4.6% |
| Louisiana | 0.1% | 0.2% | 0.3% | 0.2% | | | 1.9% | 2.4% | 2.2% | 2.4% | 4.2% | 6.2% |
| Maine | 0.0% | 0.0% | 0.0% | 0.0% | | | 0.4% | 0.4% | 0.6% | 0.7% | 1.3% | 2.0% |
| Maryland | 0.0% | 0.0% | 0.0% | 0.0% | | | 1.4% | 1.5% | 2.6% | 4.3% | 8.2% | 11.8% |
| Massachusetts | 0.0% | 0.0% | 0.0% | 0.1% | | | 1.1% | 2.5% | 4.8% | 6.8% | 9.6% | 12.6% |
| Michigan | 0.0% | 0.0% | 0.3% | 0.2% | | | 1.4% | 1.8% | 2.2% | 3.3% | 4.4% | 5.6% |
| Minnesota | 0.0% | 0.0% | 0.1% | 0.1% | | | 0.6% | 0.8% | 1.2% | 2.9% | 4.7% | 6.1% |
| Mississippi | 0.0% | 0.0% | 0.1% | 0.0% | | | 0.4% | 1.0% | 0.6% | 1.4% | 2.7% | 3.6% |
| Missouri | 0.0% | 0.1% | 0.1% | 0.1% | | | 0.9% | 1.1% | 1.2% | 2.1% | 3.5% | 4.9% |
| Montana | 0.0% | 0.1% | 0.5% | 0.4% | | | 1.1% | 1.3% | 1.5% | 2.0% | 2.9% | 4.2% |
| Nebraska | 0.0% | 0.2% | 0.5% | 0.4% | | | 1.4% | 1.8% | 2.3% | 5.5% | 9.2% | 12.0% |
| Nevada | 1.1% | 1.8% | 3.7% | 2.8% | | | 5.6% | 6.7% | 10.4% | 19.7% | 26.5% | 28.7% |
| New Hampshire | 0.0% | 0.0% | 0.0% | 0.0% | | | 0.4% | 0.6% | 1.0% | 1.7% | 2.8% | 4.3% |
| New Jersey | 0.0% | 0.0% | 0.0% | 0.2% | | | 4.3% | 6.7% | 9.6% | 13.3% | 17.7% | 21.6% |
| New Mexico | 6.9% | 9.8% | 15.2% | 41.7% | 36.5% | 28.3% | 37.4% | 36.6% | 38.2% | 42.1% | 46.3% | 47.7% |
| (New York (state)) New York | 0.0% | 0.0% | 0.0% | 1.0% | | | 8.0% | 9.5% | 12.3% | 15.1% | 17.6% | 19.5% |
| North Carolina | 0.0% | 0.0% | 0.0% | 0.0% | | | 0.4% | 1.0% | 1.2% | 4.7% | 8.4% | 10.7% |
| North Dakota | 0.0% | 0.0% | 0.1% | 0.0% | | | 0.3% | 0.6% | 0.7% | 1.2% | 2.0% | 4.3% |
| Ohio | 0.0% | 0.0% | 0.1% | 0.1% | | | 0.9% | 1.1% | 1.3% | 1.9% | 3.1% | 4.4% |
| Oklahoma | 0.3% | 0.4% | 0.2% | 0.2% | | | 1.4% | 1.9% | 2.7% | 5.2% | 8.9% | 11.9% |
| Oregon | 0.0% | 0.1% | 0.2% | 0.1% | | | 1.7% | 2.5% | 4.0% | 8.0% | 11.7% | 13.9% |
| Pennsylvania | 0.0% | 0.0% | 0.0% | 0.1% | | | 0.9% | 1.3% | 2.0% | 3.2% | 5.7% | 8.1% |
| Puerto Rico | | | | | | | | | | 98.8% | 99.0% | 98.9% |
| Rhode Island | 0.0% | 0.0% | 0.0% | 0.1% | | | 0.7% | 2.1% | 4.6% | 8.7% | 12.4% | 16.6% |
| South Carolina | 0.0% | 0.0% | 0.0% | 0.0% | | | 0.4% | 1.1% | 0.9% | 2.4% | 5.1% | 6.9% |
| South Dakota | 0.0% | 0.0% | 0.1% | 0.0% | | | 0.4% | 0.6% | 0.8% | 1.4% | 2.7% | 4.4% |
| Tennessee | 0.0% | 0.0% | 0.0% | 0.0% | | | 0.4% | 0.7% | 0.7% | 2.2% | 4.6% | 6.9% |
| Texas | 7.1% | 9.9% | 13.8% | 11.5% | 13.3% | 14.8% | 17.7% | 21.0% | 25.5% | 32.0% | 37.6% | 39.3% |
| Utah | 0.0% | 0.3% | 0.8% | 0.5% | | | 4.1% | 4.1% | 4.9% | 9.0% | 13.0% | 15.1% |
| Vermont | 0.0% | 0.0% | 0.0% | 0.2% | | | 0.6% | 0.6% | 0.7% | 0.9% | 1.5% | 2.4% |
| Virginia | 0.0% | 0.0% | 0.0% | 0.0% | | | 1.0% | 1.5% | 2.6% | 4.7% | 7.9% | 10.5% |
| (Washington (state)) Washington | 0.0% | 0.0% | 0.0% | 0.1% | | | 2.1% | 2.9% | 4.4% | 7.5% | 11.2% | 13.7% |
| West Virginia | 0.0% | 0.0% | 0.0% | 0.1% | | | 0.4% | 0.7% | 0.5% | 0.7% | 1.2% | 1.9% |
| Wisconsin | 0.0% | 0.0% | 0.1% | 0.1% | | | 0.9% | 1.3% | 1.9% | 3.6% | 5.9% | 7.6% |
| Wyoming | 0.2% | 1.1% | 3.2% | 2.4% | | | 5.6% | 5.2% | 5.7% | 6.4% | 8.9% | 10.2% |

== See also ==
- Mexican migration
- Demographics of Hispanic and Latino Americans
- Christianity among Hispanic and Latino Americans

Cities and neighborhoods:

- List of U.S. cities with large Hispanic and Latino populations
- List of U.S. cities by Spanish-speaking population
- List of California communities with Hispanic- or Latino-majority populations in the 2010 census
