= Lists of U.S. state topics =

The following are Wikipedia listings related to the United States of America.

== Political divisions ==
- Political divisions of the United States
  - U.S. state
  - List of states and territories of the United States
    - List of U.S. state partition proposals
  - Counties:
    - List of United States counties and county equivalents
    - List of counties by U.S. state and territory
    - List of the most populous counties by U.S. state
    - List of U.S. states by number of county equivalents

== Buildings ==
- Archives and libraries – List of U.S. state libraries and archives
- Capitols – List of state and territorial capitols in the United States
- Highest buildings – List of tallest buildings by U.S. state and territory
- Hospitals – Lists of hospitals in the United States by U.S. state and territory
- Museums – List of U.S. state historical societies and museums
- Prisons – Lists of state prisons by U.S. state

== Corruption, scandals and crimes ==
- List of federal political scandals in the United States
- List of American federal politicians convicted of crimes
- List of federal political sex scandals in the United States
- List of American state and local politicians convicted of crimes
- List of 2020s American state and local politicians convicted of crimes

== Demographics ==
- African-American population – List of U.S. states by African-American population
- American Human Development Index – List of U.S. states and district by American Human Development Index
- Amish population – List of U.S. states by Amish population
- Hispanic American population – List of U.S. states by Hispanic and Latino population
- Human Development Index – List of U.S. states by Human Development Index
- Irreligion – List of U.S. states, district, and territories by irreligion rate
- Latino American population – List of U.S. state, district, and territorial Hispanic and Latino American population
- Life expectancy – List of U.S. states and district by life expectancy
- Socioeconomics – List of U.S. states by socioeconomic factors
- Obesity – List of U.S. state and district obesity prevalence
- Population – List of U.S. states, district, and territories by population
- Population density – List of U.S. states, district, and territories by population density
- Population growth rate – List of U.S. states, district, and territories by population growth rate

== Economy ==
- Billionaires – List of U.S. states and district by number of billionaires
- Budgets – List of U.S. state budgets
- Economic growth rate – List of U.S. states by economic growth rate
- Electricity — List of power stations in the United States by state
- Exports and imports — List of U.S. states and territories by exports and imports
- Federal tax revenue – List of federal tax revenue by U.S. state, district, or territory
- Federal taxation and spending – List of U.S. states and district by federal net per capita taxation less spending
- Gini coefficient – List of U.S. states and district by Gini coefficient
- Gross domestic product (GDP) – List of U.S. states and district by gross domestic product
- Income – List of U.S. states and district by income
- Income equality – List of U.S. states and district by Gini coefficient
- Income tax – List of U.S. states with a flat rate individual income tax
- Income tax – List of U.S. states with no individual income tax
- Median household income – List of U.S. states and district by median household income
- Millionaire households – List of U.S. states by the number of millionaire households
- Minimum wages – List of U.S. state, district, and territorial minimum wages
- Per capita income – List of U.S. states and district by per capita income
- Per capita personal income – List of states by adjusted per capita personal income
- Poverty rate – List of U.S. states and district by poverty rate
- Research and development spending – List of U.S. states by research and development spending
- Sales taxes – List of U.S. state, district, and territorial sales taxes

== Geography and cities ==
- Area – List of U.S. states and territories by area
- Capitals – List of U.S. state capitals
  - Historical capitals – List of historical U.S. state, colonial, and territorial capitals
- Cities – List of largest cities of U.S. states and territories by population
- Coastline – List of U.S. states and territories by coastline
- Elevation – List of U.S. states and territories by elevation
- Time offsets – List of time offsets by U.S. state and territory

== Governance and laws ==
- Abortion law – List of U.S. state abortion law
- Admission to the Union
- Age of consent law – List of U.S. state and district age of consent law
- Alcohol law – List of U.S. state or district alcohol law
- Alford plea – List of Alford plea legal status by U.S. state
- Attorneys general – List of current U.S. state attorneys general
- Constitutions – List of U.S. state, district, and territorial constitutions
- Governors – List of current United States governors
- Gun law – List of U.S. state or district gun law
- Law enforcement agencies – List of U.S. state and district law enforcement agency lists
- Legal codes – List of U.S. state, district, and territorial legal codes
- Legislators – List of current U.S. state legislators
- Legislatures – List of United States state legislatures
- Lieutenant governors – List of current United States lieutenant governors
- Same-sex union and marriage:
  - Constitutional bans on same-sex unions – List of U.S. state constitutional amendments banning same-sex unions by type
  - Same-sex marriage laws – List of U.S. state and district same-sex marriage law
  - Same-sex union laws – List of U.S. state and district same-sex union law
- Self-representation – List of U.S. state and district constitutional provisions allowing self-representation in courts
- Smoking law – List of U.S. state, district, and territorial tobacco smoking law
- State Voting Rights Act - List of U.S. states with improved protections for Voting Rights
- Statewide elected officials – List of U.S. statewide elected officials
- Treasurers – List of current U.S. state treasurers

== History ==
- Date of admission – List of U.S. states by date of admission to the Union
- Historical capitals – List of historical U.S. state, colonial, and territorial capitals
- Historical societies and museums – List of U.S. state historical societies and museums
- Preceding entities – included in List of U.S. states by date of admission to the Union

== Names and languages ==
- Demonyms – List of U.S. state and district demonyms
- Language – List of U.S. state, district, and territorial language status
  - English language – List of U.S. state, district, and territorial language status
  - Spanish language – List of U.S. state, district, and territorial Spanish language use
- Names and pronunciation – List of U.S. states
- Name etymologies – List of U.S. state name etymologies
- Nicknames – List of U.S. state, district, and territorial nicknames

== Other ==
- Carbon dioxide emissions – List of U.S. states and district by carbon dioxide emissions
- Codes and abbreviations – List of U.S. state and territory abbreviations
  - ISO 3166-2 codes – ISO 3166-2:US
- Educational attainment – Lists of U.S. states and district by educational attainment
- Fertility rate – List of U.S. states, district, and territories by total fertility rate
- Gun homicide – List of U.S. states by gun homicide rate
- Incarceration rate – List of U.S. states by incarceration rate
- Labor union affiliation – List of U.S. states and district by labor union affiliation rate
- License plates – List of U.S. state, district, and territorial motor vehicle license plates
- Motor vehicles – List of U.S. states and district by motor vehicle registrations per capita
- National Historic Landmarks – List of U.S. state, district, and territorial National Historic Landmark lists
- Parks – List of U.S. state park lists
- Poets laureate – List of U.S. state poets laureate
- Renewable energy – List of U.S. states by renewable portion of electric energy generation
- Superfund sites – List of U.S. state, district, and territorial Superfund site lists
- Unemployment rate – List of U.S. states and district by unemployment rate
- Wilderness areas – List of U.S. state and tribal wilderness areas
- List of online encyclopedias of U.S. states, free encyclopedias, typically maintained by state historical societies, universities, or humanities councils

== See also ==
- Wikipedia U.S. state articles, portals, and WikiProjects – Wikipedia:List of U.S. state portals
- History of slavery in the United States by state
- Index of Alabama-related articles
- Index of Alaska-related articles
- Index of Arizona-related articles
- Index of Arkansas-related articles
- Index of California-related articles
- Index of Colorado-related articles
- Index of Connecticut-related articles
- Index of Delaware-related articles
- Index of Florida-related articles
- Index of Georgia-related articles
- Index of Idaho-related articles
- Index of Illinois-related articles
- Index of Indiana-related articles
- Index of Iowa-related articles
- Index of Kansas-related articles
- Index of Kentucky-related articles
- Index of Louisiana-related articles
- Index of Maine-related articles
- Index of Maryland-related articles
- Index of Massachusetts-related articles
- Index of Michigan-related articles
- Index of Minnesota-related articles
- Index of Mississippi-related articles
- Index of Missouri-related articles
- Index of Montana-related articles
- Index of Nebraska-related articles
- Index of Nevada-related articles
- Index of New Hampshire–related articles
- Index of New Jersey–related articles
- Index of New Mexico–related articles
- Index of New York (state)–related articles
- Index of North Carolina–related articles
- Index of North Dakota–related articles
- Index of Ohio-related articles
- Index of Oklahoma-related articles
- Index of Oregon-related articles
- Index of Pennsylvania-related articles
- Index of Rhode Island–related articles
- Index of South Carolina–related articles
- Index of South Dakota–related articles
- Index of Tennessee-related articles
- Index of Texas-related articles
- Index of Utah-related articles
- Index of Vermont-related articles
- Index of Virginia-related articles
- Index of Washington (state)-related articles
- Index of Washington, D.C.–related articles
- Index of West Virginia–related articles
- Index of Wisconsin-related articles
- Index of Wyoming-related articles
