= List of U.S. states by electricity production =

This is a list of U.S. states by electricity production. The US generated 4,430 TWh in 2025. Some 12 TWh of net imports and 247 TWh of line losses resulted in total consumption of 4,195 TWh. Texas produced the most with 567 TWh, twice as much as Florida or Pennsylvania.

In 2024, natural gas was the largest source of electricity in the US and for 28 states. Wind power was the largest renewable source for 19 states.

Data are from the EIA and are for the year 2024.

== Total production (TWh) ==
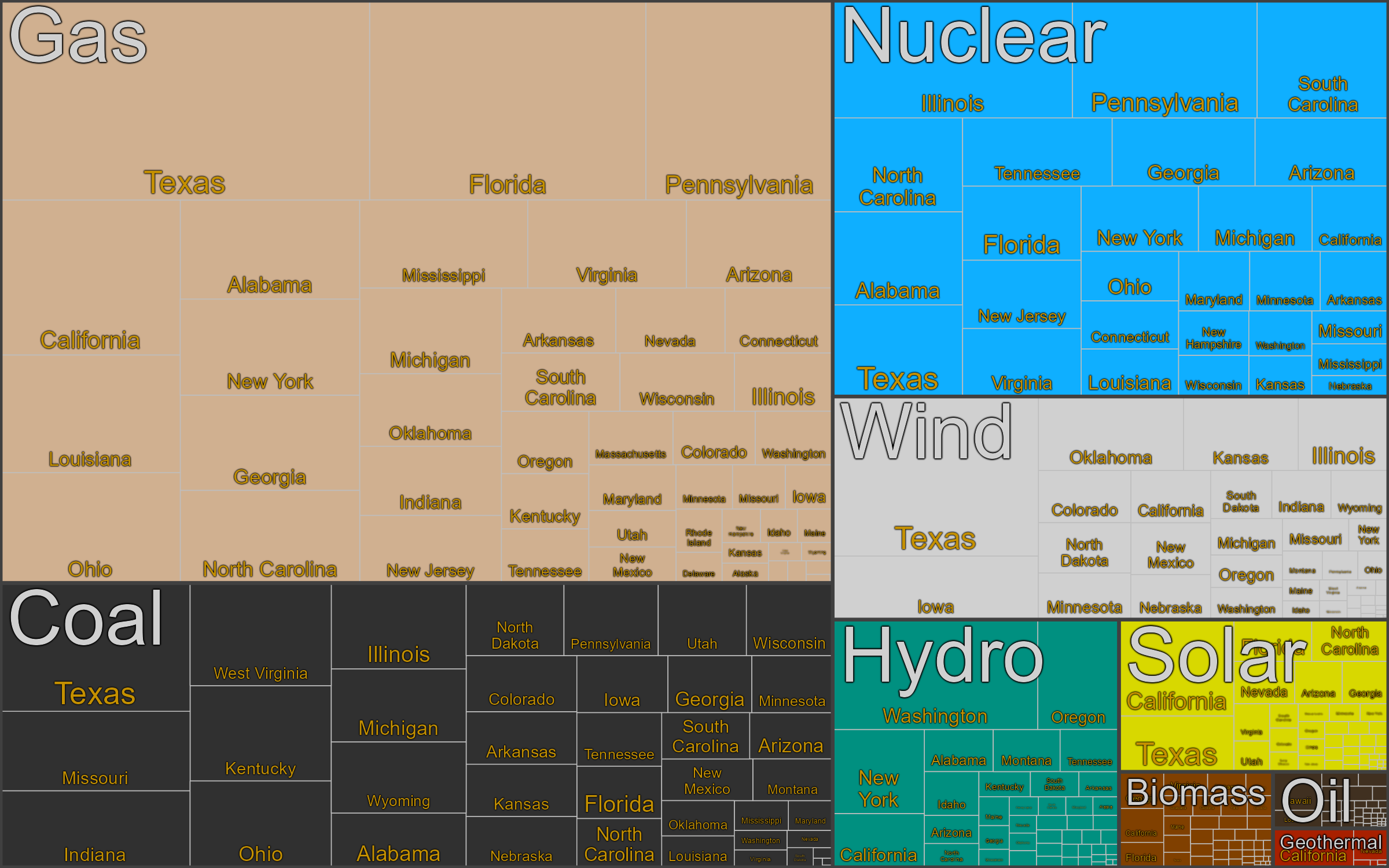
Generation by source (2022)

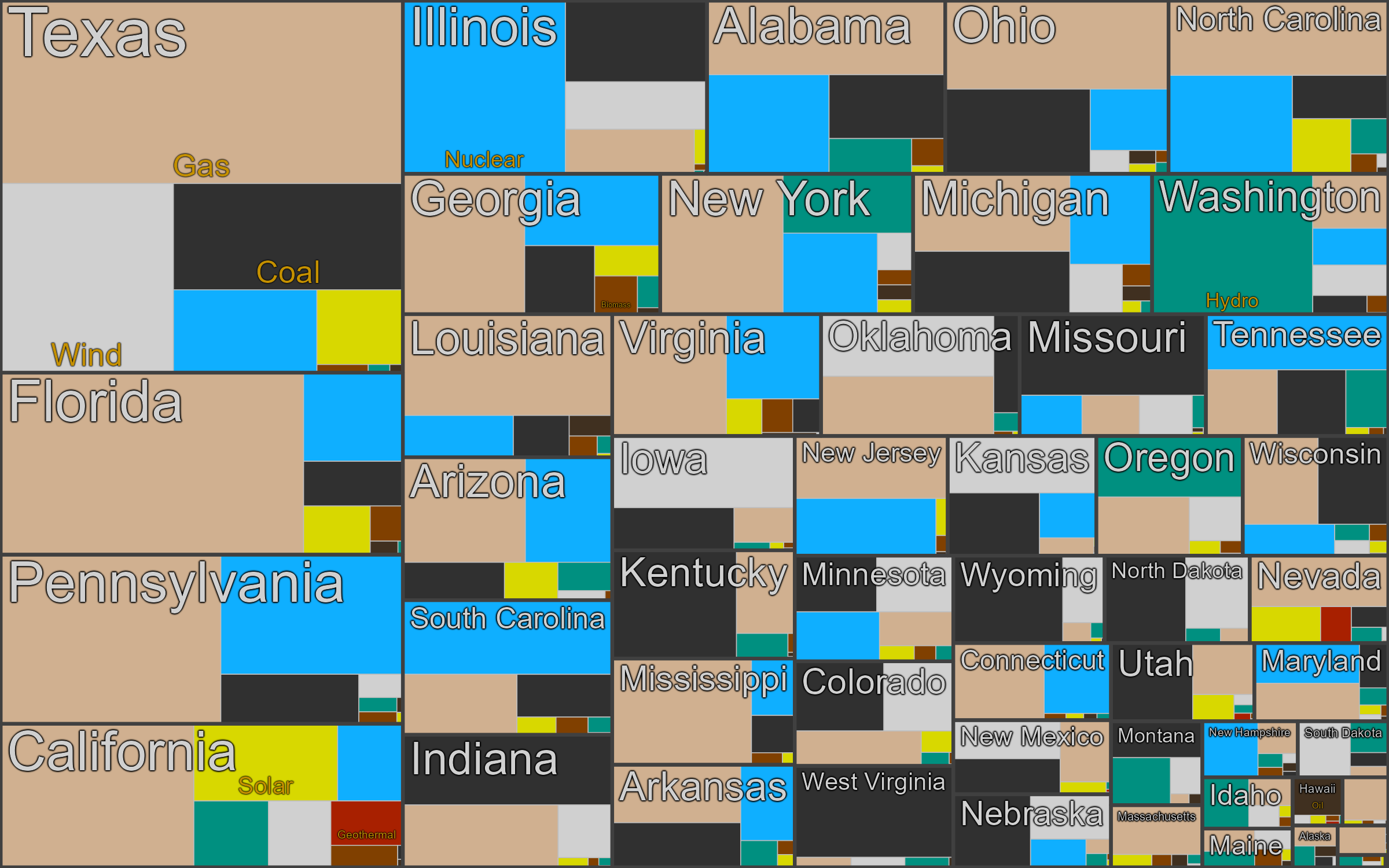
Generation by state (2022)

Location	Total (TWh)	Generation (terawatt-hours)								
Location	Total (TWh)	Gas	Coal	Nuclear	Wind	Hydro	Solar	Bio.	Oil	Geo.
United States	4,309	1,881	652	782	452	237	220	46	15	15
Texas	567	296	66	39	124	0.78	41	0.92	0.23	0
Florida	266	205	8	29	0	0.18	19	3.0	0.81	0
Pennsylvania	241	144	13	75	3.3	1.8	1.1	1.5	0.09	0
California	214	88	0.25	18	16	29	48	4.7	0.06	11
Illinois	185	30	27	99	25	0.07	3	0.22	0.02	0
Alabama	143	65	21	44	0	8.4	1.3	3.3	0.01	0
Ohio	143	86	30	18	2.8	0.47	4.0	0.29	1.1	0
Georgia	140	57	18	48	0	2.2	9.2	5.4	0.24	0
North Carolina	135	56	17	43	0.53	4.8	12	1.5	0.16	0
New York	129	62	0	27	6.0	28	3.1	1.6	0.31	0
Michigan	124	57	26	26	9.8	0.28	1.9	1.9	1.5	0
Arizona	116	55	9.8	32	2.5	5.3	11	0.02	0.03	0
Virginia	103	61	2.0	29	0.05	-0.28	7.0	3.4	0.20	0
Washington	102	18	2.8	10	8.9	61	0.44	1.1	0.04	0
South Carolina	100	23	17	54	0	2.2	2.9	1.8	0.11	0
Louisiana	100	77	3.7	15	0	0.89	1.2	2.0	0.05	0
Indiana	97	42	41	0	10	0.38	3.1	0.18	0.12	0
Oklahoma	94	48	6.1	0	38	1.5	0.31	0.09	0.03	0
Mississippi	77	60	3.3	11	0.35	0	1.7	1.3	0.01	0
Tennessee	76	16	17	32	0.01	8.3	1.1	0.47	0.12	0
Iowa	70	9.8	14	0	44	1.0	0.67	0.22	0.05	0
Kentucky	67	17	45	0	0	4.1	0.28	0.39	0.06	0
Missouri	67	9.1	39	11	6.8	1.2	0.21	0.11	0.15	0
Wisconsin	65	26	21	10	2.0	2.1	2.9	1.1	0.07	0
Oregon	65	25	0	0	9.5	27	2.0	1.1	0.01	0.17
Arkansas	62	25	16	15	0	3.2	2.3	0.79	0.05	0
New Jersey	60	30	0	28	0.02	-0.23	1.6	0.66	0.03	0
Colorado	59	18	16	0	18	1.7	4.9	0.09	0.04	0
Minnesota	59	16	11	12	15	0.87	2.3	1.2	0.02	0
Kansas	58	5.3	13	9.2	30	0.02	0.12	0.06	0.10	0
West Virginia	51	3.8	43	0	2.0	1.4	0.19	0.01	0.12	0
Nevada	46	25	2.3	0	0.32	1.6	12	0.05	0.01	3.9
Connecticut	45	26	0	17	0.01	0.37	0.48	0.55	0.02	0
North Dakota	43	2.5	23	0	15	2.1	0	0	0.04	0
Wyoming	41	5.8	24	0	9.0	1.0	0.42	0	0.05	0
New Mexico	40	12	8.4	0	15	0.15	4.3	0.03	0	0.03
Nebraska	37	1.4	16	6.1	12	1.2	0.20	0.08	0.05	0
Maryland	35	14	2.5	15	0.56	1.8	1.0	0.33	0.21	0
Utah	35	12	16	0	0.75	0.76	5.3	0.07	0.03	0.45
Montana	27	1.0	9.8	0	5.8	9.2	0.37	0.03	0.39	0
Massachusetts	21	16	0	0	0.17	0.40	2.1	0.93	0.18	0
South Dakota	21	2.3	1.6	0	12	4.6	0.34	0.02	0.02	0
Idaho	20	6.3	0	0	3.0	9.2	1.0	0.40	0	0.09
New Hampshire	17	4.4	0.22	9.7	0.44	1.4	0	0.66	0.05	0
Maine	15	6.4	0.03	0	2.4	2.9	0.95	1.6	0.06	0
Rhode Island	9.8	8.8	0	0	0.18	0	0.60	0.20	0.01	0
Hawaii	9.2	0	0	0	0.66	0.10	0.70	0.22	7.1	0.26
Alaska	6.7	3.1	0.75	0	0.12	1.7	0.01	0.04	0.92	0
Delaware	4.8	4.2	0.14	0	0	0	0.17	0.04	0.02	0
Vermont	2.3	0	0	0	0.36	1.3	0.22	0.40	0	0
DC	0.19	0.10	0	0	0	0	0.03	0.06	0	0

== Total production (percent) ==
Largest overall source (2024) Gas Coal Nuclear Wind Hydro Oil

Largest renewable source (2024) Wind Hydro Solar Biomass

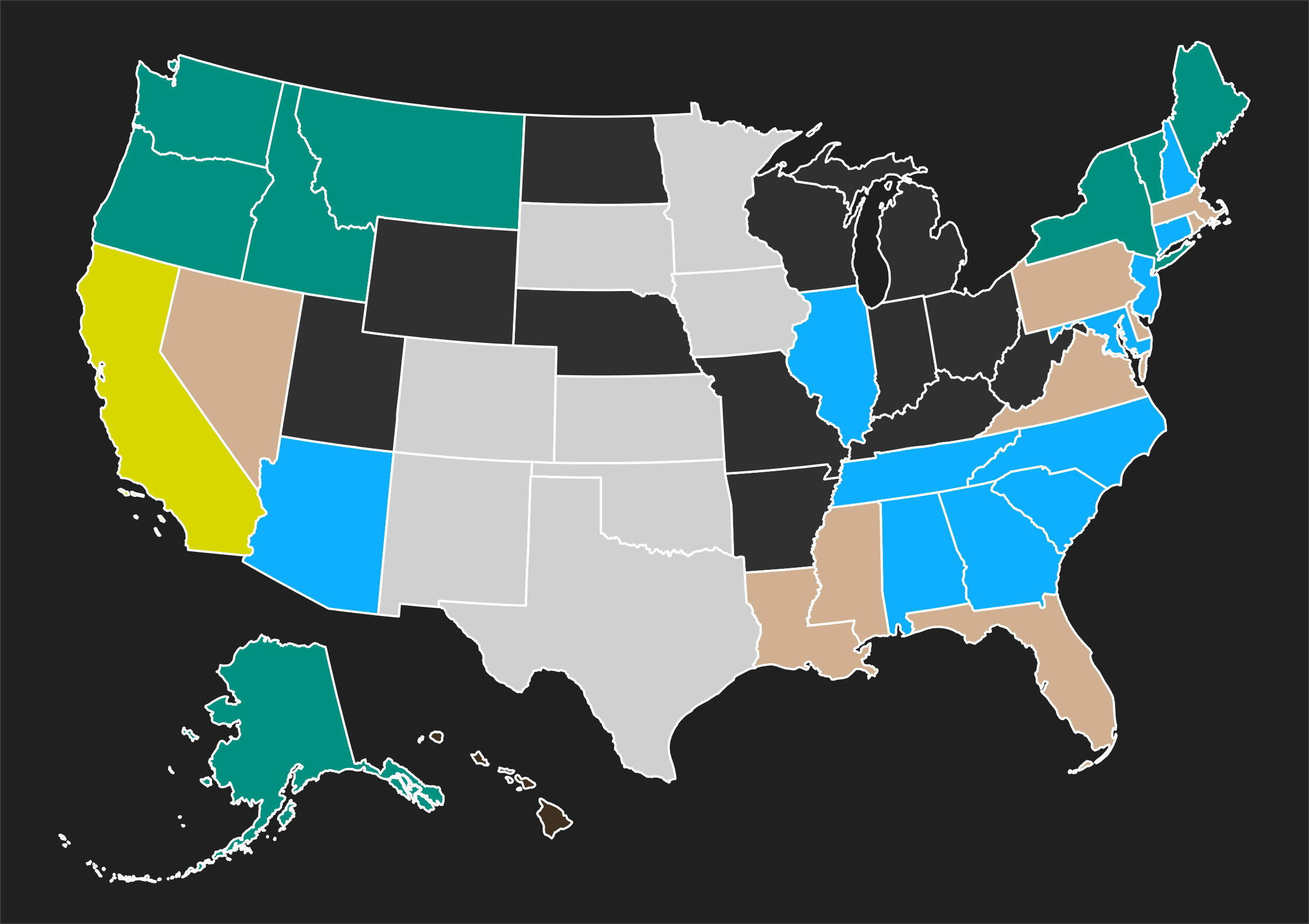
Most over-represented source (2022)

Location	% of US	Percent of state										
Location	% of US	Gas	Coal	Nuclear	Wind	Hydro	Solar	Bio.	Oil	Geo.	Fossil Fuels	Renewable
United States	100%	43%	15%	18%	10%	6%	5%	1%	0%	0%	59%	23%
Texas	13%	52%	12%	7%	22%	0%	7%	0%	0%	0%	64%	29%
Florida	6%	77%	3%	11%	0%	0%	7%	1%	0%	0%	80%	8%
Pennsylvania	6%	60%	5%	31%	1%	1%	0%	1%	0%	0%	65%	3%
California	5%	41%	0%	9%	7%	14%	23%	2%	0%	5%	41%	51%
Illinois	4%	16%	15%	54%	13%	0%	2%	0%	0%	0%	31%	15%
Alabama	3%	45%	15%	31%	0%	6%	1%	2%	0%	0%	60%	9%
Ohio	3%	60%	21%	13%	2%	0%	3%	0%	1%	0%	82%	5%
Georgia	3%	41%	13%	34%	0%	2%	7%	4%	0%	0%	54%	12%
North Carolina	3%	41%	13%	32%	0%	4%	9%	1%	0%	0%	54%	14%
New York	3%	48%	0%	21%	5%	22%	2%	1%	0%	0%	49%	30%
Michigan	3%	45%	21%	21%	8%	0%	1%	2%	1%	0%	68%	11%
Arizona	3%	47%	8%	28%	2%	5%	9%	0%	0%	0%	56%	16%
Virginia	2%	59%	2%	28%	0%	0%	7%	3%	0%	0%	62%	10%
Washington	2%	18%	3%	10%	9%	59%	0%	1%	0%	0%	21%	69%
South Carolina	2%	23%	17%	54%	0%	2%	3%	2%	0%	0%	40%	7%
Louisiana	2%	76%	4%	15%	0%	1%	1%	2%	0%	0%	81%	4%
Indiana	2%	43%	42%	0%	11%	0%	3%	0%	0%	0%	85%	14%
Oklahoma	2%	51%	7%	0%	40%	2%	0%	0%	0%	0%	57%	43%
Mississippi	2%	78%	4%	14%	0%	0%	2%	2%	0%	0%	82%	4%
Tennessee	2%	22%	23%	42%	0%	11%	1%	1%	0%	0%	45%	13%
Iowa	2%	14%	21%	0%	63%	1%	1%	0%	0%	0%	34%	66%
Kentucky	2%	26%	67%	0%	0%	6%	0%	1%	0%	0%	93%	7%
Missouri	2%	14%	58%	14%	10%	2%	0%	0%	0%	0%	72%	12%
Wisconsin	2%	40%	32%	16%	3%	3%	4%	2%	0%	0%	72%	12%
Oregon	2%	39%	0%	0%	15%	42%	3%	2%	0%	0%	39%	61%
Arkansas	1%	40%	25%	24%	0%	5%	4%	1%	0%	0%	66%	10%
New Jersey	1%	50%	0%	46%	0%	0%	3%	4%	0%	0%	50%	3%
Colorado	1%	30%	28%	0%	30%	3%	8%	0%	0%	0%	59%	41%
Minnesota	1%	27%	20%	20%	25%	1%	4%	2%	0%	0%	47%	33%
Kansas	1%	9%	23%	16%	52%	0%	0%	0%	0%	0%	32%	52%
West Virginia	1%	7%	85%	0%	4%	3%	0%	0%	0%	0%	93%	7%
Nevada	1%	55%	5%	0%	1%	4%	27%	0%	0%	9%	60%	40%
Connecticut	1%	58%	0%	38%	0%	1%	1%	1%	0%	0%	58%	3%
North Dakota	1%	6%	54%	0%	35%	5%	0%	0%	0%	0%	60%	40%
Wyoming	1%	14%	60%	0%	22%	2%	1%	0%	0%	0%	74%	26%
New Mexico	1%	29%	21%	0%	38%	0%	11%	0%	0%	0%	51%	49%
Nebraska	1%	4%	44%	16%	32%	3%	1%	0%	0%	0%	48%	36%
Maryland	1%	39%	7%	42%	2%	5%	3%	1%	1%	0%	47%	11%
Utah	1%	33%	45%	0%	2%	2%	15%	0%	0%	1%	79%	21%
Montana	1%	4%	36%	0%	22%	34%	1%	0%	1%	0%	42%	57%
Massachusetts	0%	77%	0%	0%	1%	2%	10%	4%	1%	0%	78%	17%
South Dakota	0%	8%	10%	0%	58%	24%	0%	0%	0%	0%	18%	82%
Idaho	0%	31%	0%	0%	15%	46%	5%	2%	0%	0%	31%	68%
New Hampshire	0%	26%	1%	57%	3%	8%	0%	4%	0%	0%	28%	15%
Maine	0%	44%	0%	0%	17%	19%	6%	11%	0%	0%	44%	54%
Rhode Island	0%	90%	0%	0%	2%	0%	6%	2%	0%	0%	90%	10%
Hawaii	0%	0%	0%	0%	7%	1%	8%	2%	77%	3%	77%	21%
Alaska	0%	47%	11%	0%	2%	26%	0%	1%	14%	0%	72%	28%
Delaware	0%	92%	3%	0%	0%	0%	3%	1%	0%	0%	96%	4%
Vermont	0%	0%	0%	0%	16%	57%	10%	18%	0%	0%	0%	100%
DC	0%	53%	0%	0%	0%	0%	17%	30%	0%	0%	53%	47%

== See also ==
- Electricity sector of the United States
- List of countries by electricity production
- List of U.S. states and territories by carbon dioxide emissions
- List of U.S. states by renewable electricity production
