= List of U.S. states by electricity consumption from renewable sources =

This is a list of U.S. states by renewable energy consumption as a share of state total energy consumption.

== List ==
State	% renew.
Alabama	16.8%
Alaska	4.0%
Arizona	11.8%
Arkansas	11.4%
California	16.5%
Colorado	13.4%
Connecticut	7.0%
Delaware	2.8%
District of Columbia	2.1%
Florida	7.9%
Georgia	12.0%
Hawaii	13.5%
Idaho	28.7%
Illinois	8.2%
Indiana	7.1%
Iowa	36.5%
Kansas	24.4%
Kentucky	6.3%
Louisiana	3.4%
Maine	38.0%
Maryland	5.5%
Massachusetts	7.4%
Michigan	9.0%
Minnesota	16.5%
Mississippi	6.6%
Missouri	6.9%
Montana	33.2%
Nebraska	23.5%
Nevada	17.7%
New Hampshire	17.3%
New Jersey	4.3%
New Mexico	15.2%
New York	14.0%
North Carolina	11.9%
North Dakota	28.3%
Ohio	4.4%
Oklahoma	21.4%
Pennsylvania	6.4%
Rhode Island	7.9%
South Carolina	11.3%
South Dakota	43.1%
Tennessee	10.4%
Texas	8.5%
Utah	7.5%
Vermont	31.7%
Virginia	7.5%
Washington	49.7%
West Virginia	6.0%
Wisconsin	10.7%
Wyoming	13.6%

== See also ==
- List of U.S. states by electricity production from renewable sources
- Renewable energy in the United States
- Electricity sector of the United States
- List of U.S. states and territories by carbon dioxide emissions
- List of countries by carbon dioxide emissions
