= List of states and territories of the United States =

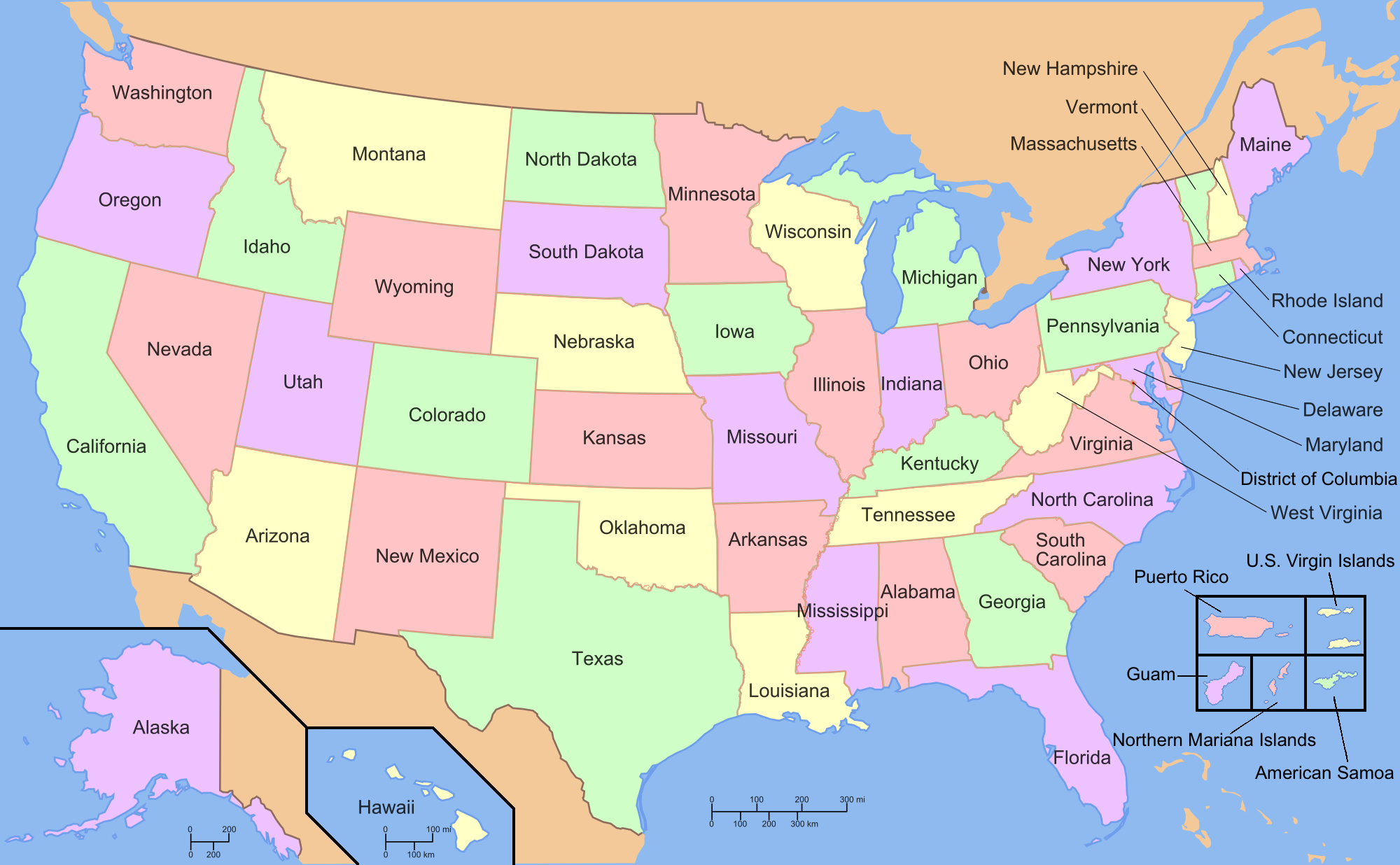
A map of the United States showing its 50 states, federal district and five inhabited territories. Alaska, Hawaii, and the territories are shown at different scales. The Aleutian Islands and the uninhabited northwestern Hawaiian Islands are omitted from the map.

The United States of America is a federal republic consisting of 50 states and a federal district (Washington, D.C., the capital city of the United States). The U.S. also possesses five major territories and nine minor islands. Both the states and the United States as a whole are each sovereign jurisdictions. The Tenth Amendment to the United States Constitution allows states to exercise all powers of government not delegated to the federal government. Each state has its own constitution and government. All states and their residents are represented in the federal Congress, a bicameral legislature consisting of the Senate and the House of Representatives. Each state elects two senators, while representatives are distributed among the states in proportion to the most recent constitutionally mandated decennial census.

Each state is entitled to select a number of electors to vote in the Electoral College, the body that elects the nation's president and vice president, equal to the total of representatives and senators in Congress from that state. The federal district does not have representatives in the Senate, but has a non-voting delegate in the House, and it is entitled to electors in the Electoral College. Congress can admit more states, but it cannot create a new state from territory of an existing state or merge two or more states into one without the consent of all states involved. Each new state is admitted on an equal footing with the existing states.

The United States asserts sovereignty over fourteen territories outside the 50 states and federal district—five of them (American Samoa, Guam, the Northern Mariana Islands, Puerto Rico, and the United States Virgin Islands) with a permanent, non-military population. Nine others (the United States Minor Outlying Islands) are mostly uninhabited. With the exception of Navassa Island, Puerto Rico, and the U.S. Virgin Islands, which are located in the Caribbean, all U.S. territories are located in the Pacific Ocean. One, Palmyra Atoll, is considered to be incorporated, meaning the full body of the Constitution has been applied to it. The other territories are officially unincorporated, meaning that the Constitution does not fully apply to them. Ten territories (the Minor Outlying Islands and American Samoa) are considered to be unorganized, i.e., an organic act of administration has not been adopted by Congress. The four other territories are organized, meaning an organic act has been approved. The five inhabited territories each have limited autonomy and elect their own territorial legislatures and governors. However, their residents cannot vote in federal elections, including the U.S. presidential elections, although they are represented by non-voting delegates in the U.S. Congress (specifically, in the House of Representatives).

The largest state by population is California, with a population of 39,538,223 people. The smallest is Wyoming, with a population of 576,851 people. The federal district has a larger population (689,545) than both Wyoming and Vermont. The largest state by area is Alaska, encompassing 665,384 square miles (1,723,340 km^{2}). The smallest is Rhode Island, encompassing 1,545 square miles (4,000 km^{2}). The most recent states to be admitted, Alaska and Hawaii, were admitted in 1959. The largest territory by population is Puerto Rico, with a population of 3,285,874 people, larger than 21 states. The smallest is the Northern Mariana Islands, with a population of 47,329 people. Puerto Rico is the largest territory by area, encompassing 5,325 square miles (13,790 km^{2}). The smallest territory, Kingman Reef, encompasses 0.005 square miles (0.013 km^{2}), or a little larger than 3 acres.

== States ==
States of the United States of America
Flag, name and postal abbreviation		Cities		Ratification or admission (Note: The original 13 states became sovereign in July 1776 upon agreeing to the United States Declaration of Independence, and each joined the first Union of states between 1777 and 1781, upon ratifying the Articles of Confederation. These states are presented in the order in which each ratified the 1787 Constitution, thus joining the present federal Union of states. Subsequent states are listed in the order of their admission to the Union, and the date given is the official establishment date set by Act of Congress. For further details, see List of U.S. states by date of admission to the Union)	Population (2020)	Total area		Counties and County Equivalents	Reps.
Flag, name and postal abbreviation		Capital	Largest	Ratification or admission	Population (2020)	mi^{2}	km^{2}	Counties and County Equivalents	Reps.
Alabama	AL	Montgomery	Huntsville	Dec 14, 1819	5,024,279	52,420	135,767	67 counties	7
Alaska	AK	Juneau	Anchorage	Jan 3, 1959	733,391	665,384	1,723,337	19 organized boroughs and 1 Unorganized Borough divided into 11 census areas	1
Arizona	AZ	Phoenix		Feb 14, 1912	7,151,502	113,990	295,234	15 counties	9
Arkansas	AR	Little Rock		Jun 15, 1836	3,011,524	53,179	137,732	75 counties	4
California	CA	Sacramento	Los Angeles	Sep 9, 1850	39,538,223	163,695	423,967	58 counties	52
Colorado	CO	Denver		Aug 1, 1876	5,773,714	104,094	269,601	64 counties	8
Connecticut	CT	Hartford	Bridgeport	Jan 9, 1788	3,605,944	5,543	14,357	9 councils of government and 8 historical counties	5
Delaware	DE	Dover	Wilmington	Dec 7, 1787	989,948	2,489	6,446	3 counties	1
Florida	FL	Tallahassee	Jacksonville	Mar 3, 1845	21,538,187	65,758	170,312	67 counties	28
Georgia	GA	Atlanta		Jan 2, 1788	10,711,908	59,425	153,910	159 counties	14
Hawaii	HI	Honolulu		Aug 21, 1959	1,455,271	10,932	28,313	5 counties	2
Idaho	ID	Boise		Jul 3, 1890	1,839,106	83,569	216,443	44 counties	2
Illinois	IL	Springfield	Chicago	Dec 3, 1818	12,812,508	57,914	149,995	102 counties	17
Indiana	IN	Indianapolis		Dec 11, 1816	6,785,528	36,420	94,326	92 counties	9
Iowa	IA	Des Moines		Dec 28, 1846	3,190,369	56,273	145,746	99 counties	4
Kansas	KS	Topeka	Wichita	Jan 29, 1861	2,937,880	82,278	213,100	105 counties	4
Kentucky (Note: Uses the term commonwealth rather than state in its full official name)	KY	Frankfort	Louisville	Jun 1, 1792	4,505,836	40,408	104,656	120 counties	6
Louisiana	LA	Baton Rouge	New Orleans	Apr 30, 1812	4,657,757	52,378	135,659	64 parishes	6
Maine	ME	Augusta	Portland	Mar 15, 1820	1,362,359	35,380	91,633	16 counties	2
Maryland	MD	Annapolis	Baltimore	Apr 28, 1788	6,177,224	12,406	32,131	23 counties and 1 independent city	8
Massachusetts	MA	Boston		Feb 6, 1788	7,029,917	10,554	27,336	14 counties	9
Michigan	MI	Lansing	Detroit	Jan 26, 1837	10,077,331	96,714	250,487	83 counties	13
Minnesota	MN	Saint Paul	Minneapolis	May 11, 1858	5,706,494	86,936	225,163	87 counties	8
Mississippi	MS	Jackson		Dec 10, 1817	2,961,279	48,432	125,438	82 counties	4
Missouri	MO	Jefferson City	Kansas City	Aug 10, 1821	6,154,913	69,707	180,540	114 counties and 1 independent city	8
Montana	MT	Helena	Billings	Nov 8, 1889	1,084,225	147,040	380,831	56 counties	2
Nebraska	NE	Lincoln	Omaha	Mar 1, 1867	1,961,504	77,348	200,330	93 counties	3
Nevada	NV	Carson City	Las Vegas	Oct 31, 1864	3,104,614	110,572	286,380	16 counties and 1 independent city	4
New Hampshire	NH	Concord	Manchester	Jun 21, 1788	1,377,529	9,349	24,214	10 counties	2
New Jersey	NJ	Trenton	Newark	Dec 18, 1787	9,288,994	8,723	22,591	21 counties	12
New Mexico	NM	Santa Fe	Albuquerque	Jan 6, 1912	2,117,522	121,590	314,917	33 counties	3
New York	NY	Albany	New York City	Jul 26, 1788	20,201,249	54,555	141,297	62 counties	26
North Carolina	NC	Raleigh	Charlotte	Nov 21, 1789	10,439,388	53,819	139,391	100 counties	14
North Dakota	ND	Bismarck	Fargo	Nov 2, 1889	779,094	70,698	183,108	53 counties	1
Ohio	OH	Columbus		Mar 1, 1803	11,799,448	44,826	116,098	88 counties	15
Oklahoma	OK	Oklahoma City		Nov 16, 1907	3,959,353	69,899	181,037	77 counties	5
Oregon	OR	Salem	Portland	Feb 14, 1859	4,237,256	98,379	254,799	36 counties	6
Pennsylvania	PA	Harrisburg	Philadelphia	Dec 12, 1787	13,002,700	46,054	119,280	67 counties	17
Rhode Island	RI	Providence		May 29, 1790	1,097,379	1,545	4,001	5 counties	2
South Carolina	SC	Columbia	Charleston	May 23, 1788	5,118,425	32,020	82,933	46 counties	7
South Dakota	SD	Pierre	Sioux Falls	Nov 2, 1889	886,667	77,116	199,729	66 counties	1
Tennessee	TN	Nashville		Jun 1, 1796	6,910,840	42,144	109,153	95 counties	9
Texas	TX	Austin	Houston	Dec 29, 1845	29,145,505	268,596	695,662	254 counties	38
Utah	UT	Salt Lake City		Jan 4, 1896	3,271,616	84,897	219,882	29 counties	4
Vermont	VT	Montpelier	Burlington	Mar 4, 1791	643,077	9,616	24,906	14 counties	1
Virginia	VA	Richmond	Virginia Beach	Jun 25, 1788	8,631,393	42,775	110,787	95 counties and 38 independent cities	11
Washington	WA	Olympia	Seattle	Nov 11, 1889	7,705,281	71,298	184,661	39 counties	10
West Virginia	WV	Charleston		Jun 20, 1863	1,793,716	24,230	62,756	55 counties	2
Wisconsin	WI	Madison	Milwaukee	May 29, 1848	5,893,718	65,496	169,635	72 counties	8
Wyoming	WY	Cheyenne		Jul 10, 1890	576,851	97,813	253,335	23 counties	1

== Federal district ==
Federal district of the United States
Flag, name and postal abbreviation		Established	Population (2020)	Total area		Counties and County Equivalents	Reps.
Flag, name and postal abbreviation		Established	Population (2020)	mi^{2}	km^{2}	Counties and County Equivalents	Reps.
District of Columbia	DC	Jul 16, 1790	689,545	68	176	considered 1 county equivalent	1 (Note: Represented by a non-voting delegate in the House of Representatives.)

== Territories ==
States and federal district Inhabited territories Uninhabited territories

=== Inhabited territories ===
Inhabited territories of the United States
Name and postal abbreviation		Capital	Acquired	Territorial status	Population (2020)	Total area		Counties and County Equivalents	Reps.
Name and postal abbreviation		Capital	Acquired	Territorial status	Population (2020)	mi^{2}	km^{2}	Counties and County Equivalents	Reps.
American Samoa	AS	Pago Pago	1900	Unincorporated, unorganized (Note: Although not organized through a federal organic act or other explicit Congressional directive on governance, the people of American Samoa adopted a constitution in 1967, and then in 1977, elected territorial officials for the first time.)	49,710	581	1,505	15 counties represented as 3 districts and 2 atolls	1
Guam	GU	Hagåtña	1899	Unincorporated, organized	153,836	571	1,478	19 villages represented as 1 County Equivalent	1
Northern Mariana Islands	MP	Saipan	1986	Unincorporated, organized (Note: Organized as a commonwealth.)	47,329	1,976	5,117	4 municipalities	1
Puerto Rico	PR	San Juan	1899	Unincorporated, organized	3,285,874	5,325	13,791	78 municipalities	1 (Note: Represented by a non-voting resident commissioner in the House of Representatives.)
U.S. Virgin Islands	VI	Charlotte Amalie	1917	Unincorporated, organized	87,146	733	1,898	2 administrative divisions split across 3 islands	1

=== Uninhabited territories ===
Territories of the United States with no permanent population
Name and postal abbreviation		Island	Acquired	Territorial status	Alternative Claims	Population	Land area (Note: Excluding lagoon)		Counties and County Equivalents
Name and postal abbreviation		Island	Acquired	Territorial status	Alternative Claims	Population	mi^{2}	km^{2}	Counties and County Equivalents
(United States) U.S. Minor Outlying Islands	N/A	Bajo Nuevo Bank (Petrel Island)	1869	Unincorporated, unorganized disputed sovereignty (administered by Colombia)	Colombia Jamaica Nicaragua	0 (2000)	56	145	9 island groups (Note: Bajo Nuevo Bank and Serranilla Bank are not considered county equivalents like the rest of the United States Minor Outlying Islands due to them being administered by Colombia.)
(United States) U.S. Minor Outlying Islands	UM-81	Baker Island	1856	Unincorporated; unorganized	N/A	0 (2025)	0.9	2.2	9 island groups
(United States) U.S. Minor Outlying Islands	UM-84	Howland Island	1858	Unincorporated, unorganized	N/A	0 (2000)	0.6	1.6	9 island groups
(United States) U.S. Minor Outlying Islands	UM-86	Jarvis Island	1856	Unincorporated, unorganized	N/A	0 (2000)	2.2	5.7	9 island groups
(United States) U.S. Minor Outlying Islands	UM-67	Johnston Atoll	1859	Unincorporated, unorganized	N/A	10 (2020)	1	2.6	9 island groups
(United States) U.S. Minor Outlying Islands	UM-89	Kingman Reef	1860	Unincorporated, unorganized	N/A	0 (2016)	0.005	0.01	9 island groups
(United States) U.S. Minor Outlying Islands	UM-71	Midway Atoll (Note: Although there are no indigenous inhabitants, around 40 United States Fish and Wildlife Service staff and service contractors live on the island at any given time.)	1867	Unincorporated, unorganized	N/A	40 (2019)	3	7.8	9 island groups
(United States) U.S. Minor Outlying Islands	UM-76	Navassa Island	1858 (Note: U.S. sovereignty is disputed by Haiti.)	Unincorporated, unorganized	Haiti	0 (2000)	3	7.8	9 island groups
(United States) U.S. Minor Outlying Islands	UM-95	Palmyra Atoll (Note: Although there are no indigenous inhabitants, between 4 and 20 Nature Conservancy, employees, United States Fish and Wildlife Service staff, and researchers live on the island at any given time.)	1898	Incorporated, unorganized	N/A	20 (2019)	1.5	3.9	9 island groups
(United States) U.S. Minor Outlying Islands	N/A	Serranilla Bank	1880	Unincorporated, unorganized disputed sovereignty (administered by Colombia)	Colombia Honduras Nicaragua	0 (2000)	463	1,2000	9 island groups
(United States) U.S. Minor Outlying Islands	UM-79	Wake Island (Note: Although there are no indigenous inhabitants, as of 2009, around 150 U.S. 150 U.S. military personnel and civilian contractors were living on the island, staffing the Wake Island Airfield and communications facilities.)	1899 (Note: U.S. sovereignty is disputed by the Republic of Marshall Islands.)	Unincorporated, unorganized	Marshall Islands	100 (2017)	2.5	6.5	9 island groups

== See also ==
- Aboriginal title in the United States – First country to recognize aboriginal title
- Compact of Free Association – US-Micronesia-Marshall Islands-Palau agreements
- Historic regions of the United States
- List of Indian reservations in the United States
- List of regions of the United States
- List of U.S. states and territories by population
- Lists of U.S. state topics
- Local government in the United States – Governmental jurisdictions below the level of the state
- Organized incorporated territories of the United States
- Proposals for a 51st state – Proposals to admit a new state into the United States
- Territorial evolution of the United States
- U.S. territorial sovereignty – Territory under US jurisdiction
- Contiguous United States
