= List of U.S. states by renewable electricity production =

This is a list of U.S. states by total electricity generation, percent of generation that is renewable, total renewable generation, percent of total domestic renewable generation, and carbon intensity in 2024.

The largest renewable electricity source was wind, which has exceeded hydro since 2019.

== Renewable generation (2024) ==
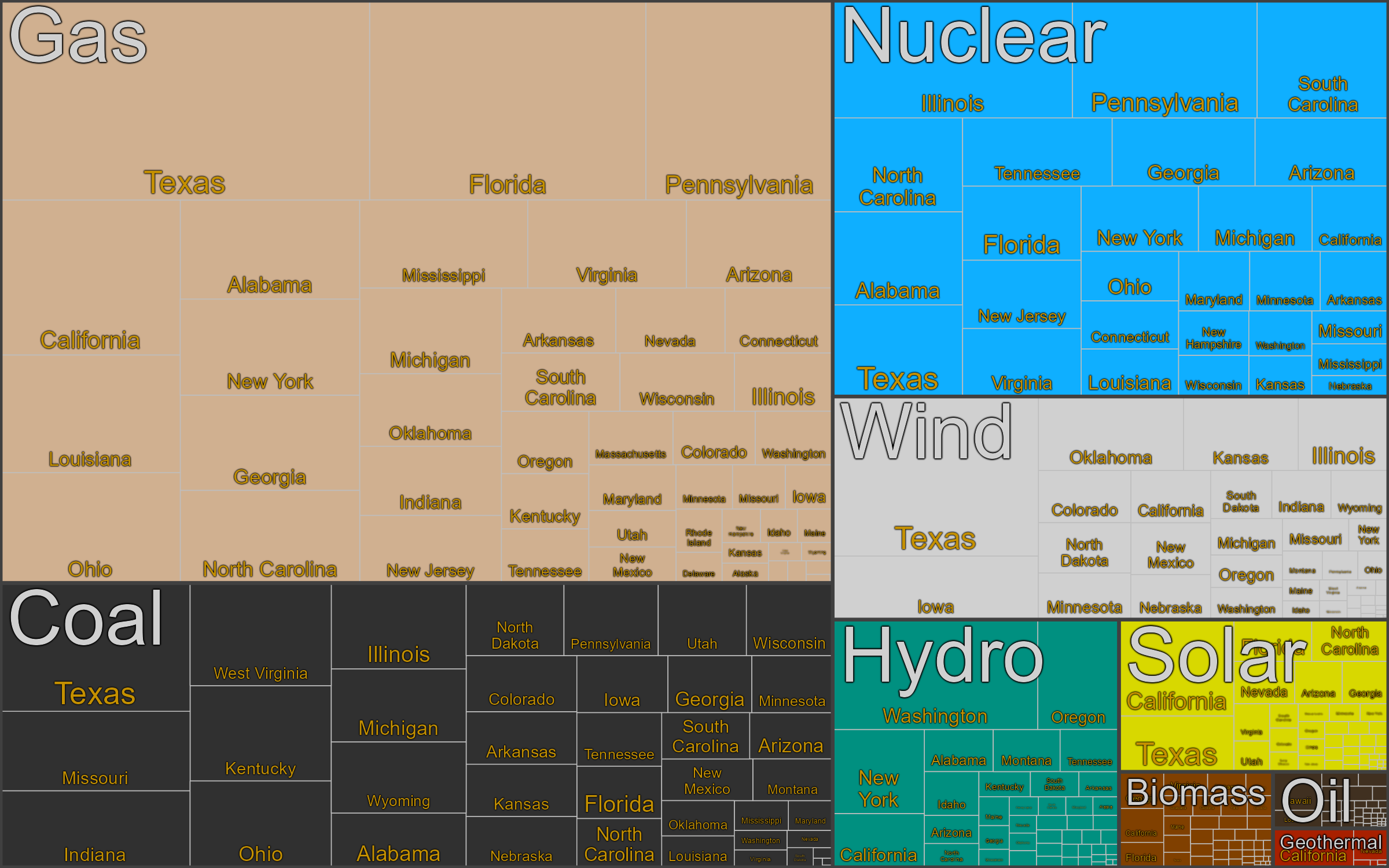
Generation by source (2022)

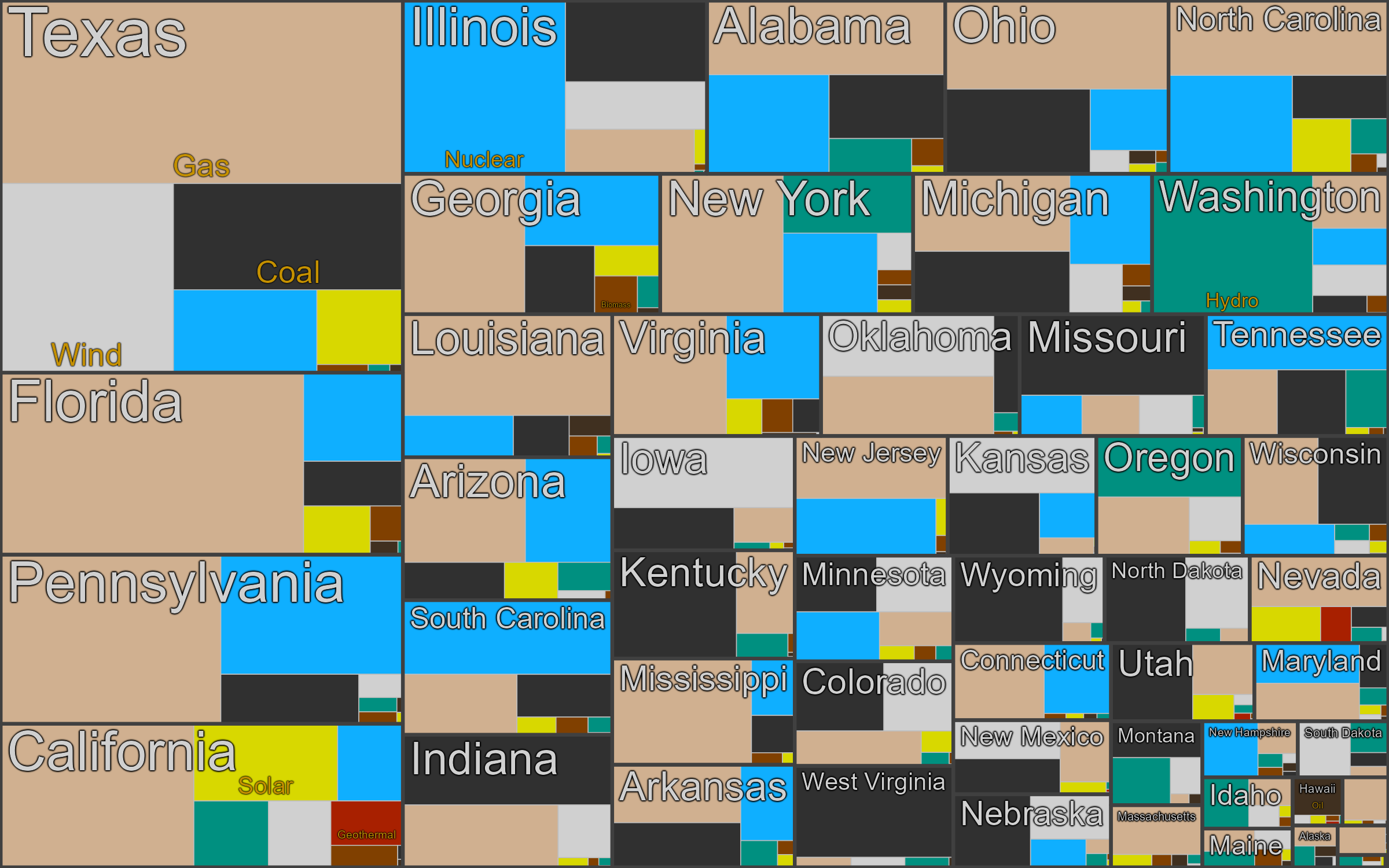
Generation by state (2022)

Largest renewable source (2024) Wind Hydro Solar Biomass

Location	Total gen. (TWh)	% renew.	Renew. gen. (TWh)	% of US renew.	CO_{2} Mt/TWh
United States	4308.6	22.5%	970.6	100%	357
Vermont	2.3	99.8%	2.3	0.23%	4
South Dakota	20.9	81.6%	17.0	1.75%	145
Washington	102.4	69.5%	71.1	7.33%	113
Idaho	20.0	68.3%	13.7	1.41%	174
Iowa	70.5	65.5%	46.2	4.76%	318
Oregon	64.7	61.4%	39.7	4.09%	160
Montana	26.9	57.4%	15.4	1.59%	441
Maine	14.7	53.8%	7.9	0.81%	221
Kansas	57.7	52.0%	30.0	3.09%	309
California	214.2	50.8%	108.8	11.21%	185
New Mexico	39.7	49.4%	19.6	2.02%	338
DC	0.2	46.8%	0.1	0.01%	426
Oklahoma	94.1	42.7%	40.1	4.14%	306
Colorado	58.8	41.4%	24.4	2.51%	435
Nevada	45.5	40.2%	18.3	1.89%	287
North Dakota	42.6	39.5%	16.8	1.73%	647
Nebraska	37.2	35.9%	13.4	1.38%	492
Minnesota	58.6	32.6%	19.1	1.97%	348
New York	129.0	29.7%	38.3	3.94%	244
Texas	566.5	29.4%	166.5	17.16%	374
Alaska	6.7	28.2%	1.9	0.19%	543
Wyoming	40.7	25.6%	10.4	1.08%	784
Hawaii	9.2	21.2%	1.9	0.20%	648
Utah	35.1	20.9%	7.3	0.76%	601
Massachusetts	20.9	17.3%	3.6	0.37%	425
Arizona	116.0	16.3%	18.9	1.95%	288
Illinois	185.0	15.3%	28.3	2.91%	232
New Hampshire	16.9	14.9%	2.5	0.26%	127
Indiana	97.0	14.4%	14.0	1.44%	633
North Carolina	135.0	13.8%	18.7	1.92%	305
Tennessee	76.2	13.0%	9.9	1.02%	366
Missouri	66.9	12.4%	8.3	0.85%	662
Wisconsin	65.3	12.3%	8.0	0.83%	495
Georgia	139.8	12.0%	16.7	1.72%	306
Michigan	124.2	11.2%	13.9	1.43%	435
Maryland	35.4	10.7%	3.8	0.39%	274
Arkansas	61.5	10.3%	6.3	0.65%	436
Rhode Island	9.8	10.0%	1.0	0.10%	376
Virginia	102.7	9.9%	10.2	1.05%	287
Alabama	142.9	9.0%	12.9	1.33%	339
Florida	266.1	8.2%	21.8	2.25%	348
Kentucky	67.0	7.1%	4.8	0.49%	793
West Virginia	50.6	7.0%	3.6	0.37%	869
South Carolina	100.5	6.9%	6.9	0.71%	268
Ohio	142.7	5.3%	7.6	0.78%	457
Delaware	4.8	4.4%	0.2	0.02%	512
Mississippi	77.3	4.3%	3.3	0.34%	361
Louisiana	99.6	4.1%	4.1	0.42%	421
New Jersey	60.2	3.4%	2.0	0.21%	230
Pennsylvania	241.5	3.2%	7.7	0.79%	299
Connecticut	44.8	3.2%	1.4	0.15%	246

== See also ==
- List of U.S. states by electricity consumption from renewable sources
- List of U.S. states by electricity production
- Renewable energy in the United States
- Electricity sector of the United States
- List of countries by renewable electricity production
- List of U.S. states and territories by carbon dioxide emissions
- List of countries by carbon dioxide emissions
