= List of sovereign states by research and development spending =

World map by research and development spending according to Our World in Data

World map of sovereign states by research and development spending per capita, according to OECD: $2000-$2249 $1750-$1999 $1500-$1749 $1250-$1499 $1000-$1249 / $750-$999 $500-$749 $250-$499 $0-$249 No data

This is a list of countries by research and development (R&D) spending in real terms, based on data published by the World Bank, and the Organisation for Economic Co-operation and Development (OECD).

== Definition ==
According to the World Bank: "Gross domestic expenditures on research and development (R&D) include both capital and current expenditures in the four main sectors: Business enterprise, Government, Higher education and Private non-profit. R&D covers basic research, applied research and experimental development."

According to the Organisation for Economic Co-operation and Development: "Gross domestic spending on R&D is defined as the total expenditure (current and capital) on R&D carried out by all resident companies, research institutes, universities and government laboratories, etc., in a country. It includes R&D funded from abroad, but excludes domestic funds for R&D performed outside the domestic economy."

== List (PPP terms) ==
As of 2024, the following list ranks countries based on their research and development spendings in purchasing power parity:

| Country | R&D spending (billions) | Global share | R&D spending per capita |
|---|---|---|---|
| China | 785.9 | 27.4% | 558 |
| United States | 781.8 | 27.2% | 2,300 |
| Japan | 186.0 | 6.5% | 1,500 |
| South Korea | 136.4 | 4.6% | 2,670 |
| Germany | 132.2 | 4.4% | 1,600 |
| United Kingdom | 86.5 | 3.0% | 1,250 |
| India | 75.7 | 2.6% | 53 |
| France | 65.8 | 2.3% | 982 |
| Turkey | 43.2 | 1.5% | 514 |
| Brazil | 38.4 | 1.3% | 180 |
| Russia | 38.1 | 1.3% | 264 |
| Canada | 33.2 | 1.2% | 812 |
| Italy | 32.5 | 1.1% | 561 |
| Spain | 29.0 | 1.0% | 617 |
| Israel | 26.5 | 0.9% | 2,820 |
| Australia | 25.1 | 0.9% | 927 |
| Netherlands | 23.0 | 0.8% | 1,300 |
| Switzerland | 20.8 | 0.7% | 2,250 |
| Belgium | 19.9 | 0.7% | 1,780 |
| Sweden | 19.9 | 0.7% | 1,930 |
| Egypt | 16.4 | 0.6% | 140 |
| Austria | 15.6 | 0.5% | 1,690 |
| Thailand | 15.1 | 0.5% | 209 |
| Singapore | 11.7 | 0.4% | 2,250 |
| UAE | 11.4 | 0.4% | 1,070 |
| Denmark | 10.4 | 0.4% | 1,790 |
| Malaysia | 10.2 | 0.4% | 300 |

== List (% of GDP) ==
The following table provides information on R&D spending, based on data published by the World Bank, and the Organisation for Economic Co-operation and Development. The indicator is measured in USD constant prices using the 2015 base year and purchasing power parities (PPPs) by OECD and as percentage of GDP. As of 2024, Israel leads the world in R&D spending as a percentage of GDP, followed by South Korea, the United States, Japan, Belgium and Sweden.

Research and development (R&D) expenditure
| Country | WB | | OECD | | |
| Country | R&D expenditure | | Gross domestic spending on R&D | | |
| Country | % of GDP | Year | % of GDP | mil USD PPC | Year |
|---|---|---|---|---|---|
| Albania | 0.20 | 2022 | | | |
| Algeria | 0.44 | 2024 | | | |
| American Samoa | 0.40 | 2006 | | | |
| Andorra | 0.16 | 2022 | | | |
| Angola | 0.03 | 2016 | | | |
| Argentina | 0.60 | 2023 | | | |
| Armenia | 0.29 | 2024 | | | |
| Australia | 1.83 | 2021 | | | |
| Austria | 3.26 | 2023 | 3.27 | 18,558.42 | 2024 |
| Azerbaijan | 0.21 | 2024 | | | |
| Bahrain | 0.19 | 2024 | | | |
| Belarus | 0.59 | 2024 | | | |
| Belgium | 3.27 | 2023 | 3.36 | 24,739.44 | 2024 |
| Bermuda | 0.23 | 2020 | | | |
| Bhutan | 0.10 | 2024 | | | |
| Bolivia | 0.06 | 2021 | | | |
| Bosnia and Herzegovina | 0.21 | 2024 | | | |
| Botswana | 0.56 | 2013 | | | |
| Brazil | 1.19 | 2023 | | | |
| Brunei | 0.28 | 2018 | | | |
| Bulgaria | 0.79 | 2023 | 0.77 | 1,529.88 | 2024 |
| Burkina Faso | 0.10 | 2024 | | | |
| Burundi | 0.21 | 2018 | | | |
| Cabo Verde | 0.07 | 2011 | | | |
| Cambodia | 0.09 | 2015 | | | |
| Canada | 1.79 | 2024 | 1.79 | 39,256.39 | 2024 |
| Chad | 0.23 | 2016 | | | |
| Chile | 0.39 | 2022 | | | |
| China | 2.58 | 2023 | 2.69 | 859,300.09 | 2024 |
| Colombia | 0.29 | 2020 | | | |
| Costa Rica | 0.34 | 2023 | 0.29 | 393.92 | 2024 |
| Croatia | 1.39 | 2023 | 1.35 | 2,094.36 | 2024 |
| Cuba | 0.44 | 2024 | | | |
| Cyprus | 0.68 | 2023 | | | |
| Czech Republic | 1.83 | 2023 | 1.82 | 9,476.11 | 2022 |
| Côte d'Ivoire | 0.07 | 2016 | | | |
| Democratic Republic of the Congo | 0.41 | 2015 | | | |
| Denmark | 3.05 | 2023 | 3.01 | 12,264.90 | 2022 |
| Ecuador | 0.44 | 2014 | | | |
| Egypt | 1.02 | 2024 | | | |
| El Salvador | 0.10 | 2023 | | | |
| Estonia | 1.84 | 2023 | 1.99 | 1,115.36 | 2022 |
| Eswatini | 0.28 | 2015 | | | |
| Ethiopia | 0.27 | 2017 | | | |
| Faroe Islands | 0.85 | 2003 | | | |
| Finland | 3.09 | 2023 | 3.22 | 9,733.68 | 2024 |
| France | 2.18 | 2023 | 2.18 | 82,107.64 | 2024 |
| Gabon | 0.58 | 2009 | | | |
| Gambia | 0.07 | 2018 | | | |
| Georgia | 0.26 | 2024 | | | |
| Germany | 3.15 | 2023 | 3.13 | 159,537.40 | 2024 |
| Ghana | 0.38 | 2010 | | | |
| Greece | 1.49 | 2023 | 1.54 | 5,832.25 | 2024 |
| Greenland | 0.65 | 2004 | | | |
| Guam | 0.26 | 2005 | | | |
| Guatemala | 0.01 | 2023 | | | |
| Honduras | 0.06 | 2019 | | | |
| Hong Kong | 1.13 | 2024 | | | |
| Hungary | 1.38 | 2023 | 1.31 | 5,031.96 | 2024 |
| Iceland | 2.64 | 2023 | 2.47 | 610.82 | 2024 |
| India | 0.65 | 2020 | | | |
| Indonesia | 0.28 | 2020 | | | |
| Iran | 0.73 | 2021 | | | |
| Iraq | 0.04 | 2021 | | | |
| Ireland | 1.59 | 2023 | 1.37 | 8,478.71 | 2024 |
| Israel | 6.35 | 2023 | 6.76 | 30,586.27 | 2024 |
| Italy | 1.38 | 2023 | 1.38 | 42,368.51 | 2024 |
| Jamaica | 0.06 | 2002 | | | |
| Japan | 3.44 | 2023 | 3.62 | 204,375.90 | 2024 |
| Jordan | 0.70 | 2016 | | | |
| Kazakhstan | 0.16 | 2024 | | | |
| Kenya | 0.81 | 2024 | | | |
| Kuwait | 0.09 | 2024 | | | |
| Kyrgyzstan | 0.05 | 2024 | | | |
| Laos | 0.04 | 2002 | | | |
| Latvia | 0.82 | 2023 | 0.91 | 615.53 | 2024 |
| Lesotho | 0.09 | 2023 | | | |
| Liechtenstein | 6.01 | 2023 | | | |
| Lithuania | 1.05 | 2023 | 1.04 | 1,370.92 | 2024 |
| Luxembourg | 1.07 | 2023 | 0.99 | 811.42 | 2024 |
| Macau | 0.31 | 2024 | | | |
| Madagascar | 0.01 | 2017 | | | |
| Malawi | 0.18 | 2019 | | | |
| Malaysia | 1.01 | 2022 | | | |
| Mali | 0.15 | 2023 | | | |
| Malta | 0.65 | 2023 | | | |
| Mauritania | 0.01 | 2018 | | | |
| Mauritius | 0.26 | 2024 | | | |
| Mexico | 0.25 | 2024 | | | |
| Moldova | 0.22 | 2024 | | | |
| Monaco | 0.04 | 2005 | | | |
| Mongolia | 0.08 | 2022 | | | |
| Montenegro | 0.36 | 2019 | | | |
| Morocco | 0.66 | 2010 | | | |
| Mozambique | 0.31 | 2015 | | | |
| Myanmar | 0.02 | 2023 | | | |
| Namibia | 0.65 | 2022 | | | |
| Nepal | 0.30 | 2010 | | | |
| Netherlands | 2.27 | 2023 | 2.29 | 28,005.66 | 2024 |
| New Zealand | 1.55 | 2023 | | | |
| Nicaragua | 0.11 | 2015 | | | |
| Nigeria | 0.28 | 2019 | | | |
| North Macedonia | 0.37 | 2024 | | | |
| Norway | 1.85 | 2023 | 1.80 | 8,287.88 | 2024 |
| Oman | 0.39 | 2024 | | | |
| Pakistan | 0.16 | 2023 | | | |
| Palestine | 0.45 | 2013 | | | |
| Panama | 0.20 | 2024 | | | |
| Papua New Guinea | 0.03 | 2016 | | | |
| Paraguay | 0.14 | 2023 | | | |
| Peru | 0.18 | 2023 | | | |
| Philippines | 0.28 | 2020 | | | |
| Poland | 1.56 | 2023 | 1.41 | 22,790.61 | 2024 |
| Portugal | 1.69 | 2023 | 1.73 | 7,635.73 | 2024 |
| Puerto Rico | 0.43 | 2015 | | | |
| Qatar | 0.68 | 2021 | | | |
| Republic of the Congo | 0.38 | 2022 | | | |
| Romania | 0.52 | 2023 | 0.46 | 3,235.71 | 2024 |
| Russia | 0.94 | 2024 | | | |
| Rwanda | 0.78 | 2023 | | | |
| Saint Lucia | 0.27 | 1999 | | | |
| Saint Vincent and the Grenadines | 0.11 | 2002 | | | |
| Saudi Arabia | 0.64 | 2024 | | | |
| Senegal | 0.58 | 2015 | | | |
| Serbia | 0.94 | 2024 | | | |
| Seychelles | 0.22 | 2016 | | | |
| Singapore | 1.81 | 2022 | | | |
| Slovakia | 1.03 | 2023 | 0.98 | 2,094.36 | 2024 |
| Slovenia | 2.13 | 2023 | 2.16 | 2,201.52 | 2024 |
| South Africa | 0.61 | 2022 | | | |
| South Korea | 4.94 | 2023 | 5.13 | 141,653.81 | 2024 |
| Spain | 1.49 | 2023 | 1.50 | 33,629.01 | 2024 |
| Sri Lanka | 0.11 | 2022 | | | |
| Sudan | 0.23 | 2005 | | | |
| Sweden | 3.60 | 2023 | 3.56 | 22,720.41 | 2024 |
| Switzerland | 3.22 | 2023 | | | |
| Syria | 0.04 | 2022 | | | |
| Taiwan | | | 4.10 | 65,084.77 | 2024 |
| Tajikistan | 0.09 | 2020 | | | |
| Tanzania | 0.51 | 2013 | | | |
| Thailand | 0.94 | 2023 | | | |
| Togo | 0.22 | 2024 | | | |
| Trinidad and Tobago | 0.05 | 2021 | | | |
| Tunisia | 0.75 | 2019 | | | |
| Turkey | 2.42 | 2023 | 1.46 | 45,563.16 | 2024 |
| Turkmenistan | 0.09 | 2023 | | | |
| Uganda | 0.44 | 2023 | | | |
| Ukraine | 0.37 | 2024 | | | |
| United Arab Emirates | 1.49 | 2021 | | | |
| United Kingdom | 2.68 | 2023 | | | |
| United States Virgin Islands | 0.03 | 2007 | | | |
| United States | 3.45 | 2023 | 3.45 | 847,935.11 | 2024 |
| Uruguay | 0.70 | 2023 | | | |
| Uzbekistan | 0.10 | 2024 | | | |
| Venezuela | 0.34 | 2014 | | | |
| Vietnam | 0.41 | 2023 | | | |
| Zambia | 0.28 | 2008 | | | |
| European Union | | | 2.13 | 508,419.52 | 2024 |
| OECD | | | 2.72 | 1,990,750.12 | 2024 |

== See also ==
- Business R&D intensity by country
- List of companies by research and development spending
- List of countries by number of scientific and technical journal articles
- List of countries by number of scientists and researchers
- List of U.S. states by research and development spending
- Science of science policy
- Science policy
- Tertiary education#Statistics
