= List of U.S. states by the number of billionaires =

This is a listing of U.S. states (plus the District of Columbia) according to the number of billionaires residing in each. As of 2024, there are 756 billionaires living in 43 of the 50 US states or Washington, D.C. The only states with no billionaire residents are Alaska, Delaware, New Hampshire, North Dakota, and West Virginia.

== Table ==
Number of billionaires per state/district
State/district	Number of billionaires as of 2023	Billionaires per one-million people
Alabama	1	0.197
Arizona	11	1.48
Arkansas	6	1.96
California	188	4.78
Colorado	12	2.04
Connecticut	13	3.58
District of Columbia (DC)	11	16.3
Florida	97	3.44
Georgia	21	1.84
Hawaii	2	1.40
Idaho	1	0.507
Illinois	23	1.84
Indiana	3	0.438
Iowa	1	0.312
Kansas	2	0.681
Kentucky	1	0.221
Louisiana	1	0.220
Maine	1	0.718
Maryland	11	1.79
Massachusetts	22	3.15
Michigan	11	1.10
Minnesota	4	0.699
Mississippi	2	0.682
Missouri	7	1.13
Montana	4	3.51
Nebraska	3	1.52
Nevada	17	5.30
New Jersey	5	0.526
New Mexico	1	0.540
New York	135	6.92
North Carolina	6	0.554
Ohio	7	0.596
Oklahoma	8	1.98
Oregon	3	0.710
Pennsylvania	18	1.39
Rhode Island	1	0.917
South Carolina	1	0.186
South Dakota	1	1.08
Tennessee	11	1.54
Texas	73	2.39
Utah	6	1.75
Virginia	7	0.804
Vermont	1	0.835
Washington	13	1.66
Wisconsin	7	1.19
Wyoming	6	10.3

For the interactive chart see: WorldPopulationView-U.S.-States

== See also ==
- List of countries by number of billionaires
