= List of U.S. states by research and development spending =

R&D employment and spending (2010)

This is a list of U.S. states and the District of Columbia by research and development (R&D) spending in 2020 adjusted US dollar.

== List ==
States by R&D spending, spending per capita and federal government spending as percentage of total R&D spending.

U.S. states by R&D spending 2020 (in adjusted 2020 dollars)
National rank	State	Expenditures on R&D (millions of US$)	Expenditures on R&D per capita in US$	Federal government share in %	Expenditures on R&D in % of GDP
1	California	217,976	4,220	1.6	7.05%
2	Washington	46,392	4,496	0.6	7.50%
3	Massachusetts	44,907	5,188	1.3	7.69%
4	New York	36,559	1,343	3.8	2.15%
5	Texas	34,589	950	2.3	1.97%
6	Maryland	27,853	3,864	52.1	6.59%
7	Michigan	24,898	2,579	0.5	4.83%
8	New Jersey	24,121	2,604	2.4	3.90%
9	Pennsylvania	21,687	1,383	1.9	2.78%
10	Illinois	19,203	1,368	0.9	2.22%
11	North Carolina	18,064	1,488	1.9	3.08%
12	Ohio	16,647	1,235	11.3	2.47%
13	Virginia	13,317	1,311	15.2	2.41%
14	Florida	11,888	495	6.4	1.08%
15	Oregon	11,537	2,326	0.8	4.61%
16	Indiana	10,303	1,293	2.4	2.76%
17	Minnesota	10,301	1,569	0.6	2.75%
18	Colorado	10,297	1,356	6.1	2.64%
19	Connecticut	9,486	2,513	0.2	3.38%
20	Arizona	9,056	1,079	2.9	2.43%
21	Georgia	8,455	745	2.3	1.37%
22	New Mexico	8,438	3,388	8.2	8.41%
23	Wisconsin	8,346	1,320	0.7	2.46%
24	Missouri	8,229	1,400	1.5	2.56%
25	Tennessee	6,187	714	12.7	1.70%
26	Alabama	5,701	1,006	25.3	2.54%
—	District of Columbia	5,701	8,050	58.3	3.97%
27	Iowa	4,480	1,385	1.6	2.32%
28	Utah	4,452	1,272	4.0	2.28%
29	Kansas	3,616	1,133	2.6	2.09%
30	New Hampshire	3,332	2,298	1.9	3.91%
31	Idaho	2,929	1,795	1.3	3.49%
32	Delaware	2,749	2,689	0.1	3.64%
33	South Carolina	2,628	540	4.1	1.09%
34	Kentucky	1,911	463	0.4	0.91%
35	Oklahoma	1,892	425	9.8	1.01%
36	Rhode Island	1,638	1,351	21.4	2.72%
37	Nebraska	1,492	601	2.6	1.16%
38	Louisiana	1,453	269	3.6	0.60%
39	Nevada	1,252	406	1.6	0.73%
40	Wyoming	1,169	2,031	2.2	3.23%
41	Mississippi	1,098	398	27.3	0.96%
42	Arkansas	892	286	4.6	0.69%
43	Hawaii	794	453	11.5	0.88%
44	Maine	769	396	1.0	1.16%
45	North Dakota	679	795	5.4	1.26%
46	Montana	608	437	10.7	1.18%
47	Vermont	574	711	0.7	1.75%
48	West Virginia	556	341	10.1	0.75%
49	South Dakota	344	393	4.9	0.63%
50	Alaska	339	410	25.7	0.67%

== See also ==
- List of countries by research and development spending
