= List of U.S. states and territories by income inequality =

The United States has the greatest income disparity among developed nations. However, the inequality indicators vary considerably from state to state. States that have a high concentration of skilled jobs, implement regressive tax policies, or have weaker worker protections in general tend to have greater income inequalities. As of 2019, the highest inequality may be observed in Puerto Rico, around the New York City and Washington, D.C. metropolitan areas, across much of the Southern United States, in California, and in Massachusetts.

== Reasons for differences in income inequality among the states ==
In the framework of American federalism, states generally have wide latitude to enact policies within their borders, including state taxation and labor laws. Among the factors that may increase inequality in a state are regressive state tax policies (taxation has played a growing role in diminishing inequality since the 1980s), tax incentives for large companies, corruption, reduced labor-union membership, right-to-work laws, lower minimum wages, poorer healthcare, and increased welfare spending on the poor. Additionally, since the 1970s, income disparities have disproportionately increased in metropolitan areas, because of the concentration of high-skilled jobs there. For example, even though New York is the state with the highest inequality, Upstate New York has much less income inequality than Downstate New York, because the economy of New York City (Gini index 0.5469) relies greatly on high-salary earners. States with better financial development tend to be more unequal than those with worse financial opportunities; but the trends go in the opposite directions for high-income and low-income states, the former having more equality up to a certain level of development, beyond which the inequality rises non-linearly. The influx of foreign direct investment lessens the disparity at the federal level, but it does not necessarily do so for individual states.

== Gini coefficient ==
Map of Gini coefficients by US state, 2019

The Gini coefficient is a measure of inequality of incomes (or sometimes wealth) across individuals. A score of "0" on the Gini coefficient represents complete equality, i.e. every person has the same income. A score of 1 would represent the case in which one person would have all the income and others would have none. Therefore, a lower Gini score is roughly associated with a more equal distribution of income and vice versa. In 2018 U.S. income inequality as measured by the Gini index was close to the highest recorded values ever.

The information was tabulated in 2019 from data from the American Community Survey (ACS) conducted by the US Census Bureau. The South, the tri-state area around New York City and California tend to have more income inequality, while the Upper Midwest, the Northwest and Northern New England are relatively more equal. According to the American Community Survey's (ACS) 2019 estimate, Utah is the most equal state when it comes to income, while New York is the most unequal by this measure, with the Gini indices, before taxes and transfer, of 0.4268 and 0.5149, respectively.

The uncertainties are not shown in the table. The ACS gives a much higher estimate of the Gini coefficient for the United States than other sources.

#	Entity (Note: State, district or territory)	Gini coefficient (2019)	Gini coefficient (2015–2019)
	United States	0.4811	0.4823
1	Puerto Rico	0.5509	0.5486
2	New York	0.5149	0.5142
3	District of Columbia	0.5115	0.5269
4	Connecticut	0.5024	0.4963
5	Louisiana	0.4978	0.4953
6	Mississippi	0.4964	0.4907
7	California	0.4866	0.4886
8	Florida	0.4808	0.4862
9	Massachusetts	0.4803	0.4826
10	Illinois	0.4800	0.4821
11	Georgia	0.4795	0.4819
12	New Jersey	0.4782	0.4814
13	New Mexico	0.4768	0.4784
14	Kentucky	0.4764	0.4786
15	Texas	0.4753	0.4791
16	Arkansas	0.4750	0.4765
17	Tennessee	0.4749	0.4788
18	South Carolina	0.4747	0.4740
19	Pennsylvania	0.4745	0.4720
20	North Carolina	0.4743	0.4760
21	Alabama	0.4741	0.4791
22	Oklahoma	0.4739	0.4689
23	Nevada	0.4710	0.4620
24	Virginia	0.4690	0.4689
25	Ohio	0.4651	0.4654
26	West Virginia	0.4644	0.4667
27	Michigan	0.4634	0.4669
28	Missouri	0.4633	0.4641
29	Rhode Island	0.4628	0.4702
30	Montana	0.4597	0.4594
31	Arizona	0.4591	0.4664
32	Indiana	0.4584	0.4526
33	Washington	0.4577	0.4573
34	Maryland	0.4558	0.4535
35	North Dakota	0.4558	0.4537
36	Colorado	0.4548	0.4566
37	Delaware	0.4509	0.4545
38	Kansas	0.4500	0.4563
39	Oregon	0.4500	0.4586
40	Maine	0.4490	0.4511
41	Vermont	0.4471	0.4484
42	Minnesota	0.4434	0.4494
43	Iowa	0.4422	0.4416
44	New Hampshire	0.4406	0.4384
45	Nebraska	0.4400	0.4442
46	Hawaii	0.4397	0.4414
47	Wisconsin	0.4391	0.4448
48	Alaska	0.4376	0.4284
49	South Dakota	0.4360	0.4440
50	Wyoming	0.4345	0.4361
51	Idaho	0.4337	0.4462
52	Utah	0.4268	0.4265

== Shares of income by percentiles ==
States and territories are sorted by the share of the lowest quintile in aggregate household income, i.e. the share of household income of 20% of the poorest households in the total household income. Due to different methodologies by which the United States Census Bureau and the EPI have calculated their results, the data should not be compared.

=== By households ===
Data for quintiles and top 5% come from the American Community Survey estimates in 2019.

#	Entity	First (lowest) quintile		Second quintile		Third quintile		Fourth quintile		Fifth (highest) quintile		Of which top 5%	
#	Entity	Mean income	Share	Mean income	Share	Mean income	Share	Mean income	Share	Mean income	Share	Mean income	Share
	United States	$14,521	3.15%	$39,139	8.48%	$66,006	14.30%	$103,917	22.51%	$238,035	51.56%	$430,662	23.32%
1	Utah	$20,124	4.18%	$49,437	10.25%	$75,847	15.73%	$109,645	22.74%	$227,022	47.09%	$403,396	20.92%
2	Idaho	$16,199	4.11%	$38,686	9.80%	$61,073	15.47%	$90,879	23.01%	$188,036	47.62%	$325,365	20.60%
3	South Dakota	$15,519	4.00%	$37,357	9.62%	$59,967	15.45%	$90,692	23.36%	$184,714	47.58%	$317,665	20.45%
4	Nebraska	$15,965	3.87%	$39,782	9.64%	$63,576	15.40%	$95,376	23.11%	$197,997	47.98%	$343,133	20.79%
5	Wisconsin	$16,034	3.87%	$39,807	9.60%	$64,285	15.51%	$96,390	23.25%	$197,977	47.76%	$345,564	20.84%
6	Iowa	$15,270	3.81%	$38,455	9.58%	$61,810	15.40%	$92,822	23.13%	$192,979	48.08%	$339,126	21.12%
7	New Hampshire	$19,002	3.77%	$48,213	9.56%	$77,837	15.43%	$117,466	23.29%	$241,891	47.96%	$412,033	20.42%
8	Maine	$14,674	3.75%	$36,011	9.20%	$59,241	15.13%	$90,983	23.24%	$190,606	48.68%	$327,475	20.91%
9	Alaska	$18,408	3.74%	$47,516	9.65%	$75,786	15.39%	$116,589	23.67%	$234,221	47.55%	$387,399	19.66%
10	Minnesota	$18,156	3.74%	$46,381	9.56%	$74,632	15.39%	$111,856	23.06%	$233,949	48.24%	$406,818	20.97%
11	Wyoming	$15,528	3.74%	$40,761	9.80%	$66,001	15.87%	$97,455	23.44%	$196,029	47.15%	$339,640	20.42%
12	Kansas	$15,090	3.67%	$38,458	9.35%	$62,366	15.16%	$94,502	22.97%	$200,932	48.85%	$350,796	21.32%
13	Vermont	$15,054	3.63%	$38,675	9.32%	$63,610	15.32%	$96,920	23.35%	$200,816	48.38%	$343,288	20.68%
14	Montana	$13,899	3.60%	$35,107	9.08%	$57,539	14.88%	$88,237	22.82%	$191,819	49.62%	$350,655	22.67%
15	Indiana	$13,987	3.59%	$35,772	9.16%	$58,036	14.87%	$89,247	22.86%	$193,279	49.52%	$348,590	22.33%
16	Colorado	$18,417	3.56%	$48,151	9.30%	$77,739	15.02%	$118,168	22.83%	$255,114	49.29%	$450,609	21.76%
17	Oregon	$15,597	3.53%	$40,845	9.24%	$67,311	15.22%	$103,468	23.39%	$215,026	48.62%	$365,465	20.66%
18	North Dakota	$15,064	3.52%	$39,112	9.14%	$64,634	15.11%	$98,958	23.13%	$209,985	49.09%	$373,709	21.84%
19	Washington	$18,576	3.51%	$48,370	9.15%	$78,904	14.92%	$120,904	22.86%	$262,118	49.56%	$457,171	21.61%
20	Arizona	$14,754	3.50%	$38,775	9.18%	$62,516	14.81%	$96,326	22.82%	$209,819	49.70%	$367,580	21.77%
21	Hawaii	$18,445	3.47%	$51,487	9.69%	$83,525	15.72%	$125,285	23.58%	$252,492	47.53%	$423,529	19.93%
22	Michigan	$13,976	3.47%	$36,017	8.93%	$59,559	14.76%	$92,178	22.85%	$201,676	49.99%	$356,455	22.09%
23	Delaware	$15,945	3.45%	$43,297	9.37%	$70,395	15.23%	$107,695	23.30%	$224,894	48.65%	$387,937	20.98%
24	Missouri	$13,294	3.42%	$34,818	8.94%	$57,697	14.82%	$89,430	22.96%	$194,185	49.86%	$345,545	22.18%
25	Ohio	$13,601	3.42%	$35,246	8.87%	$58,719	14.77%	$90,882	22.86%	$199,074	50.08%	$354,673	22.30%
26	Arkansas	$11,555	3.39%	$29,074	8.52%	$49,079	14.39%	$77,445	22.70%	$173,941	50.99%	$315,234	23.10%
27	Tennessee	$13,144	3.37%	$33,913	8.69%	$56,209	14.41%	$87,453	22.41%	$199,456	51.12%	$366,578	23.49%
28	Florida	$14,026	3.35%	$36,228	8.64%	$59,312	14.14%	$92,392	22.03%	$217,456	51.85%	$404,254	24.10%
29	North Carolina	$13,301	3.33%	$34,642	8.66%	$57,647	14.40%	$90,467	22.61%	$204,129	51.01%	$367,316	22.95%
30	Nevada	$14,425	3.32%	$39,271	9.03%	$63,769	14.67%	$97,058	22.33%	$220,208	50.65%	$415,695	23.91%
31	Maryland	$18,902	3.31%	$52,314	9.17%	$86,873	15.23%	$132,242	23.18%	$280,115	49.10%	$478,927	20.99%
32	Oklahoma	$12,507	3.31%	$32,890	8.71%	$54,708	14.49%	$85,519	22.64%	$192,061	50.85%	$352,070	23.30%
33	Pennsylvania	$14,295	3.26%	$37,855	8.62%	$63,852	14.55%	$99,443	22.65%	$223,499	50.92%	$403,160	22.96%
34	Virginia	$17,138	3.26%	$45,821	8.72%	$76,771	14.61%	$120,555	22.94%	$265,171	50.46%	$455,891	21.69%
35	Texas	$14,556	3.25%	$38,685	8.63%	$64,520	14.39%	$101,720	22.68%	$228,924	51.05%	$408,263	22.76%
36	West Virginia	$10,649	3.24%	$28,675	8.71%	$48,905	14.85%	$77,739	23.61%	$163,240	49.58%	$280,030	21.26%
37	Rhode Island	$14,829	3.20%	$40,953	8.85%	$70,808	15.30%	$107,226	23.17%	$228,951	49.47%	$406,567	21.96%
38	Georgia	$13,668	3.16%	$36,961	8.55%	$62,262	14.40%	$97,048	22.45%	$222,399	51.44%	$402,002	23.25%
39	South Carolina	$12,334	3.16%	$34,044	8.71%	$56,598	14.48%	$89,011	22.77%	$198,951	50.89%	$355,363	22.72%
40	Kentucky	$11,367	3.15%	$30,762	8.52%	$52,800	14.62%	$82,595	22.87%	$183,549	50.83%	$333,777	23.11%
41	Illinois	$14,667	3.07%	$40,418	8.44%	$69,263	14.47%	$109,103	22.79%	$245,173	51.22%	$442,476	23.11%
42	New Mexico	$10,976	3.07%	$29,804	8.33%	$52,194	14.58%	$83,044	23.20%	$181,940	50.83%	$314,941	21.99%
43	Alabama	$10,916	3.06%	$30,244	8.46%	$52,062	14.57%	$83,697	23.42%	$180,469	50.50%	$311,208	21.77%
44	New Jersey	$18,249	3.06%	$50,796	8.52%	$86,333	14.47%	$135,936	22.79%	$305,190	51.16%	$540,499	22.65%
45	California	$16,981	2.99%	$47,103	8.30%	$80,693	14.21%	$127,666	22.48%	$295,369	52.02%	$531,014	23.38%
46	Mississippi	$9,715	2.99%	$26,122	8.03%	$45,905	14.11%	$74,345	22.85%	$169,318	52.03%	$304,820	23.42%
47	Connecticut	$16,037	2.80%	$45,494	7.94%	$78,998	13.78%	$126,468	22.07%	$306,153	53.42%	$579,711	25.29%
48	Massachusetts	$16,450	2.80%	$49,102	8.36%	$86,122	14.66%	$136,548	23.25%	$299,188	50.93%	$526,243	22.40%
49	Louisiana	$9,426	2.60%	$27,826	7.66%	$51,134	14.07%	$84,866	23.36%	$190,038	52.31%	$336,976	23.19%
50	New York	$13,372	2.49%	$40,540	7.55%	$72,668	13.54%	$118,290	22.04%	$291,906	54.38%	$553,773	25.79%
51	District of Columbia	$13,762	2.03%	$50,961	7.53%	$93,636	13.83%	$156,790	23.16%	$361,695	53.44%	$640,700	23.66%
52	Puerto Rico	$2,546	1.54%	$11,355	6.87%	$20,645	12.49%	$35,887	21.71%	$94,840	57.38%	$179,744	27.19%

=== By families ===
The data presented in the table comes from the Economic Policy Institute (EPI), a think tank, relying on data from 2015 tax returns. The table is sorted according to mean income of families (leftmost column).

#	Entity (Note: State or district)	Mean income	Bottom 90%		90th-95th percentile		95th-99th percentile		99th-99.5th percentile		99.5th-99.9th percentile		99.9th-99.99th percentile		Top 0.01%		Ratios of average income	
#	Entity	Mean income	Mean	Share	Mean	Share	Mean	Share	Mean	Share	Mean	Share	Mean	Share	Mean	Share	Top 10%/Bottom 90%	Top 1%/Bottom 99%
	United States	$62,776	$35,712	51.2%	$148,367	11.82%	$251,184	16.01%	$525,941	4.19%	$1,014,839	6.47%	$3,610,007	5.18%	$32,231,855	5.15%	8.58	26.28
1	Connecticut	$92,293	$47,678	46.49%	$191,398	10.37%	$364,628	15.8%	$883,709	4.79%	$1,875,492	8.13%	$6,986,612	6.81%	$70,019,008	7.61%	10.36	37.24
2	Alaska	$80,258	$59,020	66.18%	$157,792	9.83%	$253,740	12.65%	$478,028	2.98%	$847,542	4.22%	$2,352,936	2.64%	$12,202,360	1.5%	4.6	12.66
3	New Jersey	$80,236	$45,959	51.55%	$192,645	12%	$335,564	16.73%	$706,880	4.41%	$1,356,809	6.76%	$4,310,330	4.83%	$29,977,585	3.71%	8.46	24.31
4	Massachusetts	$80,125	$43,129	48.44%	$183,931	11.48%	$326,594	16.3%	$698,164	4.36%	$1,436,407	7.17%	$5,264,275	5.91%	$50,073,531	6.33%	9.58	30.88
5	Wyoming	$79,320	$50,057	56.8%	$117,805	7.43%	$234,288	11.81%	$518,794	3.27%	$1,141,617	5.76%	$4,906,764	5.57%	$74,430,630	9.37%	6.85	31.2
6	District of Columbia	$79,080	$42,007	47.81%	$185,316	11.72%	$335,460	16.97%	$731,702	4.63%	$1,493,112	7.55%	$5,160,851	5.87%	$43,313,489	5.45%	9.83	30.42
7	North Dakota	$78,441	$56,154	64.43%	$140,368	8.95%	$251,890	12.84%	$537,519	3.43%	$979,301	4.99%	$2,849,992	3.27%	$16,638,624	2.09%	4.97	15.82
8	Maryland	$74,376	$47,989	58.07%	$173,556	11.67%	$278,771	14.99%	$539,027	3.62%	$990,375	5.33%	$3,044,613	3.68%	$19,960,954	2.64%	6.5	17.84
9	New Hampshire	$73,509	$48,522	59.41%	$159,167	10.83%	$263,486	14.34%	$497,666	3.39%	$903,356	4.92%	$3,048,414	3.73%	$24,495,804	3.4%	6.15	18.06
10	Virginia	$73,316	$47,318	58.09%	$171,941	11.73%	$275,813	15.05%	$520,672	3.55%	$935,689	5.1%	$2,980,645	3.66%	$20,071,419	2.82%	6.49	17.66
11	Colorado	$73,163	$46,003	56.59%	$161,401	11.03%	$276,993	15.14%	$560,707	3.83%	$1,052,236	5.75%	$3,431,201	4.22%	$25,509,683	3.43%	6.9	20.62
12	California	$71,531	$38,410	48.33%	$164,067	11.47%	$295,694	16.54%	$628,703	4.39%	$1,264,510	7.07%	$4,655,579	5.86%	$45,539,688	6.35%	9.62	30.7
13	New York	$71,146	$33,471	42.34%	$148,181	10.41%	$289,707	16.29%	$699,269	4.91%	$1,537,953	8.65%	$6,031,176	7.63%	$69,948,807	9.77%	12.26	44.39
14	Washington	$70,362	$41,486	53.07%	$161,375	11.47%	$278,080	15.81%	$560,971	3.99%	$1,035,344	5.89%	$3,750,399	4.8%	$35,510,381	4.99%	7.96	24.22
15	Texas	$68,497	$41,427	54.43%	$149,463	10.91%	$257,496	15.04%	$544,586	3.98%	$1,064,130	6.21%	$3,698,309	4.86%	$31,131,378	4.57%	7.53	24.16
16	Minnesota	$68,016	$42,153	55.78%	$152,178	11.19%	$265,356	15.61%	$548,160	4.03%	$982,461	5.78%	$3,190,827	4.22%	$23,313,209	3.4%	7.14	20.9
17	South Dakota	$67,344	$44,705	59.74%	$134,464	9.98%	$227,150	13.49%	$499,745	3.71%	$945,626	5.62%	$3,066,174	4.1%	$22,259,893	3.36%	6.06	19.96
18	Nebraska	$66,892	$46,300	62.29%	$139,083	10.4%	$220,227	13.17%	$442,182	3.31%	$817,349	4.89%	$2,531,241	3.41%	$17,700,629	2.54%	5.45	16.3
19	Kansas	$66,409	$44,263	59.99%	$141,368	10.64%	$228,922	13.79%	$460,073	3.46%	$849,610	5.12%	$2,773,428	3.76%	$21,151,645	3.24%	6	18.27
20	Illinois	$65,814	$37,404	51.15%	$147,512	11.21%	$266,361	16.19%	$564,312	4.29%	$1,097,449	6.67%	$3,878,629	5.3%	$34,418,224	5.19%	8.6	27.04
21	Hawaii	$65,377	$46,135	63.51%	$144,391	11.04%	$216,644	13.26%	$377,292	2.89%	$678,142	4.15%	$2,089,348	2.88%	$14,490,658	2.28%	5.17	13.74
22	Utah	$63,648	$41,144	58.18%	$140,009	11%	$226,189	14.21%	$460,298	3.62%	$870,211	5.47%	$2,875,818	4.07%	$22,200,819	3.46%	6.47	19.72
23	Oklahoma	$61,333	$41,632	61.09%	$128,051	10.44%	$203,408	13.27%	$409,091	3.34%	$763,424	4.98%	$2,492,468	3.66%	$19,982,262	3.23%	5.73	17.75
24	Pennsylvania	$61,331	$37,220	54.62%	$144,964	11.82%	$239,384	15.61%	$477,868	3.9%	$880,578	5.74%	$2,966,398	4.35%	$24,428,147	3.96%	7.48	21.66
26	Iowa	$61,100	$42,288	62.29%	$136,305	11.15%	$208,545	13.65%	$398,722	3.26%	$708,743	4.64%	$2,031,821	2.99%	$12,226,685	2.01%	5.45	14.67
27	Wisconsin	$60,087	$38,969	58.37%	$136,859	11.39%	$213,219	14.19%	$428,881	3.57%	$800,748	5.33%	$2,591,790	3.88%	$19,963,684	3.27%	6.42	18.93
28	Rhode Island	$59,736	$37,979	57.22%	$145,558	12.18%	$224,871	15.06%	$423,403	3.54%	$791,099	5.3%	$2,495,936	3.76%	$17,754,831	2.94%	6.73	18.21
29	Delaware	$59,234	$38,022	57.77%	$147,042	12.41%	$224,169	15.14%	$413,675	3.49%	$754,106	5.09%	$2,319,168	3.52%	$15,522,579	2.57%	6.58	17.03
30	Vermont	$57,946	$38,175	59.29%	$136,517	11.78%	$214,919	14.84%	$390,548	3.37%	$709,443	4.9%	$2,157,359	3.35%	$14,433,588	2.47%	6.18	16.24
31	Idaho	$55,542	$36,791	59.62%	$127,084	11.44%	$194,590	14.01%	$383,426	3.45%	$707,429	5.09%	$2,217,680	3.59%	$15,549,288	2.79%	6.1	17.38
32	Oregon	$54,718	$32,580	53.59%	$142,250	13%	$229,862	16.8%	$435,299	3.98%	$783,967	5.73%	$2,402,341	3.95%	$16,614,076	2.95%	7.8	19.72
33	Nevada	$54,603	$29,348	48.37%	$130,936	11.99%	$202,394	14.83%	$434,177	3.98%	$921,083	6.75%	$3,659,705	6.03%	$43,398,535	8.06%	9.61	32.67
34	Ohio	$54,286	$34,445	57.11%	$129,717	11.95%	$205,240	15.12%	$406,909	3.75%	$745,525	5.49%	$2,278,530	3.78%	$15,522,306	2.8%	6.76	18.61
35	Florida	$54,134	$25,330	42.11%	$132,848	12.27%	$231,578	17.11%	$526,040	4.86%	$1,115,498	8.24%	$4,246,994	7.06%	$45,516,509	8.34%	12.37	39.47
36	Indiana	$54,079	$35,292	58.73%	$129,989	12.02%	$194,351	14.38%	$384,281	3.55%	$711,978	5.27%	$2,148,945	3.58%	$13,339,757	2.48%	6.32	17.3
37	Georgia	$53,661	$30,874	51.78%	$136,683	12.74%	$227,121	16.93%	$454,127	4.23%	$850,589	6.34%	$2,690,006	4.51%	$18,861,618	3.47%	8.38	22.55
38	Missouri	$53,652	$32,679	54.82%	$131,782	12.28%	$205,077	15.29%	$402,866	3.75%	$762,426	5.68%	$2,543,690	4.27%	$20,094,857	3.9%	7.42	21.16
39	Montana	$53,305	$33,408	56.41%	$129,705	12.17%	$204,807	15.37%	$392,774	3.68%	$727,355	5.46%	$2,271,178	3.83%	$16,642,147	3.08%	6.96	18.94
40	Tennessee	$53,247	$32,630	55.15%	$125,779	11.81%	$203,017	15.25%	$409,589	3.85%	$774,209	5.82%	$2,546,641	4.3%	$20,033,457	3.82%	7.32	21.42
41	Louisiana	$52,753	$33,644	57.4%	$128,604	12.19%	$197,471	14.97%	$386,635	3.66%	$716,352	5.43%	$2,174,654	3.71%	$13,388,894	2.63%	6.68	18.07
42	North Carolina	$52,441	$31,268	53.66%	$132,419	12.63%	$216,239	16.49%	$418,122	3.99%	$768,370	5.86%	$2,402,122	4.12%	$17,703,228	3.25%	7.77	20.59
43	Michigan	$51,574	$30,266	52.82%	$136,035	13.19%	$208,895	16.2%	$403,459	3.91%	$755,627	5.86%	$2,458,467	4.29%	$19,924,851	3.73%	8.04	21.43
44	Arizona	$50,406	$29,477	52.63%	$132,016	13.1%	$211,235	16.76%	$404,154	4.01%	$761,808	6.05%	$2,387,588	4.26%	$16,609,364	3.19%	8.1	21.02
45	Maine	$48,708	$31,164	57.58%	$125,516	12.88%	$195,640	16.07%	$360,334	3.7%	$620,323	5.09%	$1,642,230	3.03%	$7,977,349	1.64%	6.63	15.41
46	Arkansas	$46,735	$27,628	53.21%	$120,300	12.87%	$180,174	15.42%	$319,775	3.42%	$622,099	5.32%	$2,174,255	4.19%	$26,603,208	5.57%	7.92	22.48
47	South Carolina	$45,871	$26,861	52.7%	$125,699	13.7%	$194,990	17%	$383,233	4.18%	$695,621	6.07%	$1,990,468	3.91%	$11,121,722	2.45%	8.08	19.7
48	Kentucky	$45,790	$28,069	55.17%	$122,430	13.37%	$180,401	15.76%	$334,689	3.65%	$616,790	5.39%	$1,868,021	3.67%	$13,368,017	2.99%	7.31	18.44
49	Alabama	$45,638	$27,318	53.87%	$124,795	13.67%	$184,396	16.16%	$360,246	3.95%	$662,432	5.81%	$1,962,084	3.87%	$12,219,118	2.67%	7.71	19.27
50	New Mexico	$45,429	$28,758	56.97%	$122,701	13.5%	$181,522	15.98%	$307,694	3.39%	$556,635	4.9%	$1,593,355	3.16%	$9,517,871	2.1%	6.8	15.5
51	Mississippi	$40,804	$25,477	56.19%	$112,693	13.81%	$160,890	15.77%	$304,102	3.73%	$538,878	5.28%	$1,484,044	3.27%	$7,929,519	1.94%	7.02	16.42
52	West Virginia	$39,993	$25,014	56.29%	$116,972	14.62%	$156,883	15.69%	$295,291	3.69%	$508,234	5.08%	$1,322,406	2.98%	$6,569,242	1.64%	6.99	15.31

== See also ==
- Income inequality in the United States
- List of U.S. states by poverty rate
- List of countries by income equality
