= Outlying islands =

Outlying islands may refer to:

== In geography ==
=== Hong Kong ===
- Islands District, a Hong Kong district
- Outlying Islands, Hong Kong, islands outside mainland New Territories, Kowloon and Hong Kong Island in Hong Kong

=== Others ===
- List of outlying islands of Indonesia
- New Zealand outlying islands
- List of outlying islands of Scotland
- Islands of the Republic of China (Taiwan) other than Taiwan Island
- United States Minor Outlying Islands

== In theatre ==
- Outlying Islands (play) (2002), a play by David Greig
