= List of U.S. state constitutional provisions allowing self-representation in state courts =

Most U.S. states and the District of Columbia have a constitutional, statutory, judicial code, or court decision provision either expressly or by interpretation allowing self-representation in state courts.

State or federal district	Provision	Language
Alabama	Const. Art 1 § 10	"That no person shall be barred from prosecuting or defending before any tribunal in this state, by himself or counsel, any civil cause to which he is a party."
Alabama	Alabama Canons of Judicial Ethics Canon III a 4	"A judge shall accord to every person who has a legal interest in a proceeding, or that person's lawyer, the right to be heard according to law"
Alaska	Stat § 22.20.040 (1996)	"An action or proceeding may be prosecuted or defended by a party in person or by an attorney..."
Arizona	Const. art II § 11	"Justice in all cases shall be administered openly..."
Arizona	Arizona Code of Judicial Conduct Canon III a 7	"A judge shall accord to every person who has a legal interest in a proceeding, or that person's lawyer, the right to be heard according to law."
Arkansas	Const. Art 11 § 13	"Every person is entitled to a certain remedy in the laws for all injuries or wrongs he may receive in his person, property or character; he ought to obtain justice freely, and without purchase, completely, and without denial, promptly and without delay, conformably to the laws.
Arkansas	ARKANSAS CODE OF JUDICIAL CONDUCT Canon III a 7	"A judge shall accord to every person who has a legal interest in a proceeding, or that person's lawyer, the right to be heard according to law"
California	Constitution Art 1 § 3	"The people have the right to...petition government for redress of grievances"
California	Rules of Civil Procedure Rule Rule 1290	"Any person named as a respondent in a petition may file a response thereto"
California	California Code of Judicial Ethics III b 7	"A judge shall accord to every person who has a legal interest in a proceeding, or that person's lawyer, full right to be heard according to law.*"'
California	Board of Commissioners v. Younger (1865) 29 Cal. 147, 149	"A party to an action may appear in his own proper person or by attorney
Colorado	Constitution Art 2 § 6	"Courts of justice shall be open to every person, and a speedy remedy afforded for every injury to person, property or character, and right and justice should be administered without sale, denial or delay"
Colorado	Supreme Court Tassian v. People, 731 P.2d 672 (Colo. 20 January 1987)	"The chief judge's directive at issue here clearly discriminates against pro se litigants solely on the basis of their pro se status and, in that respect, lacks any rational basis in fact and thus violates equal protection of the laws"
Colorado	Colorado Code of Judicial Conduct Canon III a 7	"A judge shall accord to every person who has a legal interest in a proceeding, or that person's lawyer, full right to be heard according to law"'
Connecticut	Constitution Art 1 § 10	"All courts shall be open, and every person, for an injury done to him in his person, property or reputation, shall have remedy by due course of law, and right and justice administered without sale, denial or delay."
Connecticut	State of Connecticut Judicial Branch Frequently Asked Questions	"You have a right to represent yourself in all court cases. Representing yourself is called acting pro se. Pro Se is a Latin phrase that means "for yourself."
Connecticut	Connecticut Code of Judicial Conduct Canon 3 a 4	"A judge should accord to every person who is legally interested in a proceeding, or that person's lawyer, full right to be heard according to law"
Delaware	Constitution Art 1 § 9	"All courts shall be open; and every man for an injury done him in his reputation, person, moveable or immovable possessions shall have remedy by the due course of law, and justice administered according to the very right of the cause and the law of the land, without sale, denial, or unreasonable delay or expense.
Delaware	Delaware Judge's Code of Judicial Conduct Canon II R. 2.6(A)	"A judge should accord to every person who is legally interested in a proceeding, or to the person's lawyer, full right to be heard according to law"
District of Columbia	St A Ct Rule 47	"Nothing in these rules shall be construed to prevent any person who is without counsel from prosecuting or defending an appeal in which that person is a party."
District of Columbia	Code of Judicial Conduct Canon III b 7	"A judge should accord to every person who is legally interested in a proceeding, or to the person's lawyer, full right to be heard according to law,"
Florida	Const. Art 1 § 21	"The courts shall be open to every person for redress of any injury and justice shall be administered without sale, denial or delay"
Florida	Code of Judicial Conduct for the State of Florida Canon III B 7	"A judge should accord to every person who is legally interested in a proceeding, or to the person's lawyer, full right to be heard according to law"
Georgia	Const. art 1, § 1, paragraph XII	"No person shall be deprive of the right to prosecute or defend, either in person or by an attorney, that person's own cause in any of the courts of this state."
Georgia	Georgia Code of Judicial Conduct Canon III B 7	"A judge should accord to every person who is legally interested in a proceeding, or to the person's lawyer, full right to be heard according to law,
Hawaii	Const. Art 1 § 4	"No law shall be enacted...abridging...the right of the people...to petition the government for a redress of grievances."
Hawaii	Revised Code of Judicial Conduct Canon III a 7	"A judge should accord to every person who is legally interested in a proceeding, or to the person's lawyer, full right to be heard according to law"
Idaho	Const. art 1 § 18	"Courts of justice shall be open to every person, and a speedy remedy afforded for every injury of person, property or character, and right and justice shall be administered without sale, denial, delay or prejudice".
Idaho	IDAHO CODE OF JUDICIAL CONDUCT Canon III a 7	"A judge should accord to every person who is legally interested in a proceeding, or to the person's lawyer, full right to be heard according to law,
Illinois	Const. art 1 § 12	"Every person shall find a certain remedy in the laws for all injuries and wrongs which he receives to his person, privacy, property or reputation. He shall obtain justice by law, freely, completely, and promptly."
Illinois	ILLINOIS CODE OF JUDICIAL CONDUCT Canon III a 7	
Indiana	Const. art 1 § 12	"All courts shall be open; and every person, for injury done to him in his person, property, or reputation, shall have remedy by due course of law. Justice shall be administered freely, and without purchase; completely, and without denial; speedily, and without delay."
Indiana	Judicial Canon III b 8	"A judge shall accord to every person who has a legal interest in a proceeding, or that person's lawyer, full right to be heard according to law."
Iowa	Const. art 1 § 20	"The people shall have the right to ... petition for redress of grievances."
Iowa	Iowa Court Rules Division II	"a party specially authorized by statute may sue in that person's own name"
Kansas	Const. Bill of Rights § 18	"All persons, for injuries suffered in person, reputation or property, shall have remedy by due course of law, and justice administered without delay."
Kansas	Kansas Code of Judicial Conduct Canon III a 7	"A judge shall accord to every person who has a legal interest in a proceeding, or that person's lawyer, full right to be heard according to law."
Kentucky	Const. § 14	"All courts shall be open, and every person for an injury done him in his lands, goods, person or reputation, shall have remedy by due course of law, and right and justice administered without sale, denial or delay."
Kentucky	Judicial Canon III a 7 SCR 4.300	A judge shall accord to every person who has a legal interest in a proceeding, or that person's lawyer, full right to be heard according to law.
Louisiana	Const. art 1 § 22	"All courts shall be open, and every person shall have an adequate remedy by due process of law and justice, administered without denial, partiality, or unreasonable delay, for injury to him in his person, property, reputation or other rights."
Louisiana	Louisiana Code of Judicial Conduct Canon III a 7	"A judge shall accord to every person who has a legal interest in a proceeding, or that person's lawyer, full right to be heard according to law"
Maine	Const. art 1 § 19 and § 20	"Every person, for an injury inflicted on the person or the person's reputation, property, or immunities, shall have a remedy by due course of law; and right and reputation shall be administered freely and without sale, completely and without denial, promptly and without delay."; "In all civil suits, and in all controversies concerning property, the parties shall have a right to trial by jury, except in cases where it has heretofore been otherwise practiced; the party claiming the right may be heard by himself or herself and with counsel..."
Maine	Maine Code of Judicial Conduct Canon III a 7	"A judge shall accord to every person who has a legal interest in a proceeding, or that person's lawyer, full right to be heard according to law"
Maryland	Const. Declaration of Rights art 19	"That every man, for any injury done to him in his person or property, ought to have remedy by the course of the Law of the land, and ought to have justice and right, freely without dale, fully without any denial, and speedily without delay, according to the Law of the land."
Maryland	Rule 16-813 Maryland Code of Judicial Conduct Canon III a 6 a	"A judge shall accord to every person who has a legal interest in a proceeding, or that person's lawyer, full right to be heard according to law"
Massachusetts	Const. art XI	"Every subject of the commonwealth ought to find a certain remedy, by having recourse to the laws, for all injuries or wrongs which he may receive in his person, property, or character., He ought to obtain right and justice freely, and without being obliged to purchase it, completely, and without any denial; promptly, and without delay, conformably to the laws."
Massachusetts	CODE OF JUDICIAL CONDUCT Code of Judicial Conduct Canon III a 4	"A judge shall accord to every person who has a legal interest in a proceeding, or that person's lawyer, full right to be heard according to law"
Michigan	Const. Art. I § 13 Conduct of suits in person or by counsel.	"A suitor in any court of this state has the right to prosecute or defend his suit, either in his own proper person or by an attorney."
Minnesota	Const Art 1 § 8	"Every person is entitled to a certain remedy in the laws for all injuries or wrongs which he may receive to his person. property or character, and to obtain justice freely and without purchase, completely and without denial, promptly and without delay, conformable to the laws."
Minnesota	Minnesota Code of Judicial Conduct Canon III a 7	"A judge shall accord to every person who has a legal interest in a proceeding, or that person's lawyer, full right to be heard according to law"
Mississippi	Const Art III § 25	"No personal shall be debarred from prosecuting or defending any civil cause for or against himself, before any tribunal in the state, by him or himself, or both"
Mississippi	Code of Judicial Conduct of Mississippi Judges as adopted April 4, 2002 Canon III a 7	"A judge shall accord to every person who has a legal interest in a proceeding, or that person's lawyer, full right to be heard according to law"
Missouri	Const Art II § 14	"That the courts of justice shall be open to every person, and certain remedy afforded for every injury, property or character, and that right and justice shall be administered without sale, denial or delay."
Missouri	Missouri Courts Rule 2 Code of Judicial Conduct Canon III b 7	"A judge shall accord to every person who has a legal interest in a proceeding, or that person's lawyer, full right to be heard according to law"'
Montana	Const. Art. II § 16	"Courts of justice shall be open to every person, and speedy remedy afforded for every injury of person, property or character...[r]ight and justice shall be administered without sale, denial or delay."
Montana	Code Ann. § 25-31-601	"Parties in justices court may appear and act in person or by attorney..."
Montana	Montana Canons of Judicial Ethics 3	" It is the duty of all judges to support the federal Constitution and that of this state; in so doing, they should fearlessly observe and apply fundamental limitations and guarantees.
Nebraska	Const. Art 1 § 13	"All courts shall be open, and every person, for any injury done him or her in his or her lands, goods, person, or reputation, shall have a remedy by due courts of law and justice administered without denial or delay..."
Nebraska	Judicial Canon III b 7	"A judge shall accord to every person who has a legal interest in a proceeding, or that person's lawyer, full right to be heard according to law""
Nevada	Judicial Canon III b 7	"A judge shall accord to every person who has a legal interest in a proceeding, or that person's lawyer, full right to be heard according to law".
New Hampshire	Const Bill of Rights § 14	"Every subject of this state is entitled to a certain remedy, by having recourse to the laws, for all injuries he may receive in his person, property or character; to obtain right and justice freely, without being obliged to purchase it; completely, and without any denial, promptly, and without delay; conformably to the laws."
New Hampshire	Judicial Canon III b 7	"A judge shall accord to every person who has a legal interest in a proceeding, or that person's lawyer, full right to be heard according to law"
New Jersey	Const. Art. 1 § 18	"The people shall have the right to... petition for redress of grievances."
New Jersey	Judicial Canon III a 6	"A judge shall accord to every person who has a legal interest in a proceeding, or that person's lawyer, full right to be heard according to law".
New Mexico	SCT Rule 2-107	"A party to any civil action may appear, prosecute, defend and appeal any proceeding..."
New Mexico	Judicial Ethics Handbook 4700-4701	"A judge shall accord to every person who has a legal interest in a proceeding, or that person's lawyer, the right to be heard according to law. In dealing with the pro se litigant, a judge must remain impartial but ensure that the litigant receives a fair hearing. If the judge does too much to help the party, she risks becoming an advocate; if she does too little, the party is denied the fundamental right to a fair hearing. The problem is compounded if the pro se party tests the limits of the court's patience and the judge overreacts."
New York	McKinney's CPLR § 321	"A party...may prosecute or defend a civil action in person or by attorney."
New York	New York State Bar Association Code of Judicial Conduct Canon III b 6	"A judge shall accord to every person who has a legal interest in a proceeding, or that person's lawyer, full right to be heard according to law"
North Carolina	Const. Art 1 § 18	"All courts shall be open; every person for an injury done him in lands, goods, person, or his reputation shall have remedy by due courts of law, and right and justice shall be administered without favor, denial, or delay."
North Carolina	Gen. Statute § 1-11 (1996)	"A party may appear either in person or by attorney in actions or proceedings in which he is interested."
North Carolina	North Carolina Judicial Code Canon III a 4	"A judge shall accord to every person who has a legal interest in a proceeding, or that person's lawyer, full right to be heard according to law"
North Dakota	Const. Art. 1 § 16	"All courts shall be open, and every man for an injury done him in his land, goods, person, or reputation, shall have remedy by due process of law, and right and justice administered without sale, denial, or delay."
North Dakota	North Dakota Judicial Code Canon III b 7	"A judge shall accord to every person who has a legal interest in a proceeding, or that person's lawyer, full right to be heard according to law"
Ohio	Const 1.16	Redress in courts (1851, amended 1912) "All courts shall be open, and every person, for an injury done him in his land, goods, person, or reputation, shall have remedy by due course of law, and shall have justice administered without denial or delay"
Ohio	Supreme Court of Ohio Report & Recommendation Task Force on Pro Se	"Pro se litigants, whether voluntarily unrepresented or unable to afford counsel, must be able to participate in a meaningful way in our justice system.
Oklahoma	Const Art II § 6	""The courts of justice of the State shall be open to every person, and speedy and certain remedy afforded for every wrong and for every injury to person, property, or reputation, and right and justice shall be administered without sale, denial, delay, or prejudice."
Oklahoma	Oklahoma III b 6	"A judge shall accord to every person who has a legal interest in a proceeding, or that person's lawyer, full right to be heard according to law
Oregon	Const. Art. 1 § 10	"No court shall be secret, but justice shall be administered, openly and without purchase, completely and without delay, and every man shall have remedy by due course of law for injury done him in his person, property, or reputation."
Oregon	Oregon Code of Judicial Conduct JR 2-102 a	"A judge shall accord to every person who has a legal interest in a proceeding, or that person's lawyer, full right to be heard according to law"
Pennsylvania	Const. Art. 1 § 11	"All courts shall be open; and every man for an injury done him in his lands, goods, person, or reputation shall have remedy by due course of law, and right and justice administered without sale, denial or delay."
Pennsylvania	Judicial Canon III a 4	"A judge shall accord to every person who has a legal interest in a proceeding, or that person's lawyer, full right to be heard according to law.
Rhode Island	Const. Art 1 § 5	"Every person within this state ought to find a certain remedy, by having recourse to the laws, for all injuries or wrongs which may be received in one's person, property or character. Every person ought to obtain right and justice freely, and without purchase, completely, and without denial; promptly and without delay; conformably to the laws."
Rhode Island	Judicial Canon III a 7	"A judge shall accord to every person who has a legal interest in a proceeding, or that person's lawyer, full right to be heard according to law."
South Carolina	Const. Art. 1 § 9	"All courts shall be public, and every person shall have speedy remedy therein for wrongs sustained."
South Carolina	Code Ann. § 40-5-80	"This chapter may not be construed so as to prevent a citizen from prosecuting or defending his own cause, if he so desires."
South Dakota	Const. Art VI § 20	"All courts shall be open, and every man for an injury done him in his property, person, or reputation, shall have remedy by due course of law, and right and justice, administered without denial or delay."
Tennessee	Const. Art 1 § 17	"That all courts shall be open; and every man, for an injury done him in his lands, goods, person, or reputation, shall have remedy by due course of law, and right and justice administered without sale, denial, or delay."
Tennessee	Code Ann. § 23-1-109	"Any person may conduct and manage the person's own case in any court of this state."
Texas	Const. Art. 1 § 13	"All courts shall be open, and every person for an injury done him, in his lands, goods, person or reputation, shall have remedy by due course of law."
Utah	Const. Art. 1 § 11	"All courts shall be open, and every person, for an injury done to him in his person, property or reputation, shall have remedy by due course of law, which shall be administered without denial or unnecessary delay; and no person shall be barred from prosecuting or defending before any tribunal in this State, by himself or counsel, any civil cause to which he is a party."
Utah	Judicial Canon III b 8	"A judge shall accord to every person who has a legal interest in a proceeding, or that person's lawyer, full right to be heard according to law.
Vermont	Const. Ch. 1 Art. 4	"Every person within this state ought to find a certain remedy, by having recourse to the laws, for all injuries or wrongs which one may receive in person, property or character; every person ought to obtain right and justice, freely, and without being obliged to purchase it; completely and without any denial; promptly and without delay; conformably to the laws."
Virginia	Judicial Canon III a 7	"A judge shall accord to every person who has a legal interest in a proceeding, or that person's lawyer, full right to be heard according to law
Washington	Const. Art. 1 § 10	"Justice in all cases shall be administered openly, and without unnecessary delay."
Washington	Judicial Canon III a 4	"A judge shall accord to every person who has a legal interest in a proceeding, or that person's lawyer, full right to be heard according to law.
West Virginia	Const. Art. III § 17	"The courts of this State shall be open, and every person, for an injury done to him, in his person, property or reputation, shall have remedy by due course of law; and justice shall be administered without sale, denial or delay."
West Virginia	Code of Judicial Conduct Canon III b 7	"A judge shall accord to every person who has a legal interest in a proceeding, or that person's lawyer, full right to be heard according to law.
Wisconsin	Const. Art 1 § 21 (2)	"In any court of this state, any suitor may prosecute or defend his suit either in his own proper person or by an attorney of the suitor's choice."
Wyoming	Const Art 1 § 8	"All courts shall be open and every person for an injury done to person, reputation or property shall have justice administered without sale, denial, or delay."
Wyoming	Code of Judicial Conduct Canon III b 7	"A judge shall accord to every person who has a legal interest in a proceeding, or that person's lawyer, full right to be heard according to law.
