= List of U.S. states and territories by carbon dioxide emissions =

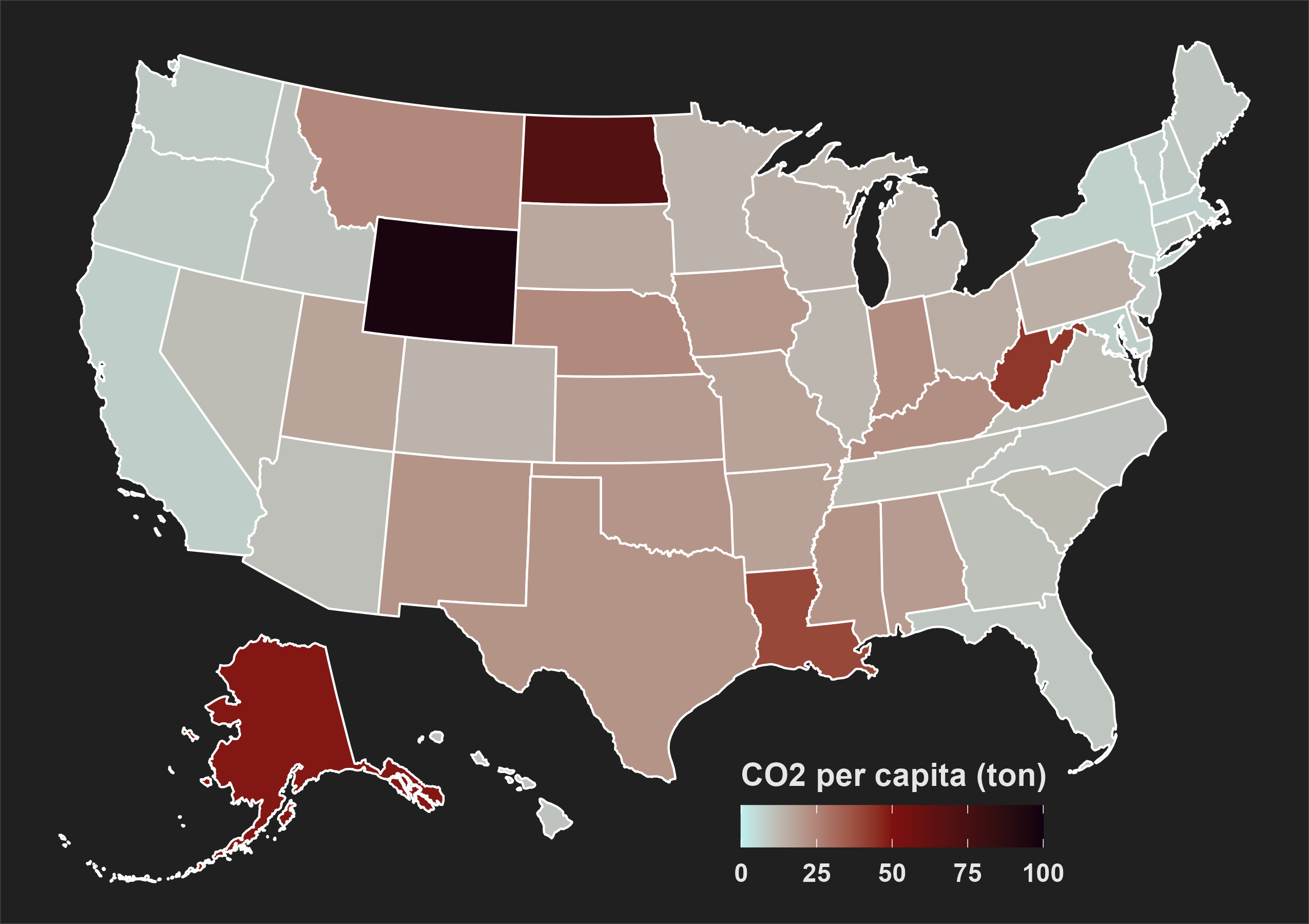
Carbon emissions per capita, 2020

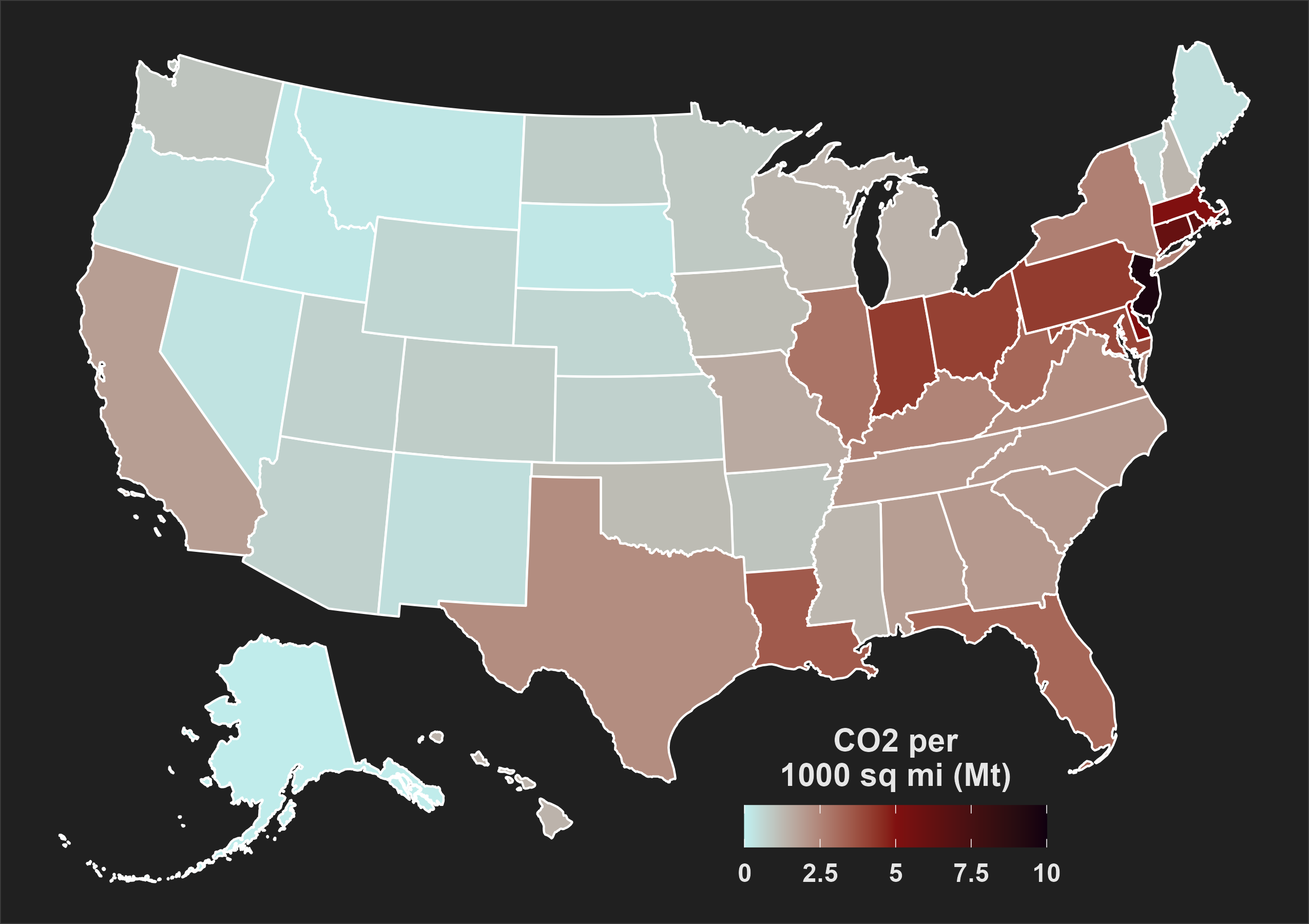
Carbon emissions per 1000 square miles, 2020

This is a list of U.S. states and territories by carbon dioxide emissions for energy use, as well as per capita and by area.

The state with the highest total carbon dioxide emissions is Texas and the lowest is Vermont. The state with the highest per capita carbon dioxide emissions is Wyoming and the lowest is Maryland.

== Table ==
CO_{2} emissions by state, 2024
State or territory	% total CO_{2}	CO_{2} (MMt)	CO_{2} (tons per capita)	CO_{2} (Mt per 1000 mi^{2})	CO_{2} change from 2020
Alabama	2.2%	104.3	20.2	2.0	5.8%
Alaska	1%	44.0	59.7	0.1	18.2%
Arizona	1.8%	82.2	10.9	0.7	3%
Arkansas	1.3%	58.4	18.9	1.1	6.4%
California	6.6%	316.0	8.0	1.9	3.9%
Colorado	1.7%	79.6	13.3	0.8	-0.3%
Connecticut	0.8%	37.1	10.1	6.7	8.9%
Delaware	0.3%	11.5	11.0	4.6	-7.7%
District of Columbia	0.1%	2.5	3.6	36.9	4.3%
Florida	4.8%	230.8	9.9	3.5	10.3%
Georgia	2.7%	127.8	11.4	2.2	9%
Hawaii	0.4%	18.0	12.5	1.6	16.5%
Idaho	0.5%	21.1	10.5	0.3	8.6%
Illinois	3.5%	164.0	12.9	2.8	-3.8%
Indiana	3.2%	152.3	22.0	4.2	-1.4%
Iowa	1.4%	65.2	20.2	1.2	-0.8%
Kansas	1.2%	55.1	18.6	0.7	-5%
Kentucky	2.3%	106.9	23.3	2.6	4.7%
Louisiana	3.9%	186.9	40.5	3.6	1.8%
Maine	0.4%	16.0	11.4	0.5	15.6%
Maryland	1.1%	48.8	7.8	3.9	1.4%
Massachusetts	1.3%	58.1	8.1	5.5	10%
Michigan	3.0%	143.1	14.2	1.5	4.4%
Minnesota	1.7%	77.9	13.4	0.9	-0.7%
Mississippi	1.4%	64.7	21.9	1.3	2.4%
Missouri	2.1%	98.0	15.7	1.4	-10.9%
Montana	0.6%	27.2	23.9	0.2	3.6%
Nebraska	1.0%	43.5	21.7	0.6	-6.9%
Nevada	0.9%	39.3	12.1	0.4	8.1%
New Hampshire	0.3%	13.6	9.7	1.5	8.9%
New Jersey	1.9%	87.8	9.2	10.1	4.5%
New Mexico	0.9%	41.6	19.6	0.3	-8.6%
New York	3.5%	163.7	8.2	3.0	12.3%
North Carolina	2.5%	119.1	10.8	2.2	10.7%
North Dakota	1.2%	55.1	69.5	0.8	1.6%
Ohio	3.9%	186.3	15.7	4.2	0.3%
Oklahoma	1.9%	88.6	21.6	1.3	5.5%
Oregon	0.9%	38.9	9.1	0.4	4%
Pennsylvania	4.2%	201.6	15.5	4.4	4.1%
Rhode Island	0.3%	11.0	9.9	7.1	11.3%
South Carolina	1.5%	70.8	12.9	2.2	10.7%
South Dakota	0.4%	15.1	16.3	0.2	1.5%
Tennessee	1.9%	90.5	12.5	2.1	8.1%
Texas	14.2%	679.9	21.7	2.5	8.5%
Utah	1.2%	55.0	15.7	0.6	-4%
Vermont	0.2%	5.4	8.3	0.6	-0.9%
Virginia	2.1%	99.2	11.3	2.3	1.1%
Washington	1.6%	73.8	9.3	1.0	7.5%
West Virginia	1.6%	72.3	40.9	3.0	-6.7%
Wisconsin	1.8%	85.1	14.3	1.3	-2.4%
Wyoming	1.1%	50.0	85.2	0.5	-11.2%
American Samoa	0.1%	0.5	10.4	0.9	23%
Guam	0.1%	3.0	19.5	5.3	40%
Northern Mariana Islands	0.0%	0.0	0.0	0.0	0.0
Puerto Rico	0.5%	20.0	6.1	3.8	5%
US Virgin Islands	0.1%	2.0	22.9	2.7	-20%
States and DC	99.5%	4,784.9	14.1	1.3	4.1%
US Total	100%	4,810.4	14.0	1.3	4.1%

== See also ==
- Greenhouse gas emissions by the United States
- List of countries by carbon dioxide emissions
- Top contributors to greenhouse gas emissions
