= Hardberg =

Hardberg may refer to:

- Hardberg (Odenwald), a hill in the Odenwald range in Hesse, Germany
- Hardberg (Schwarzwald), a mountain of Baden-Württemberg, Germany
