= Heersberg =

Coordinates: 48°14′N 8°57′E

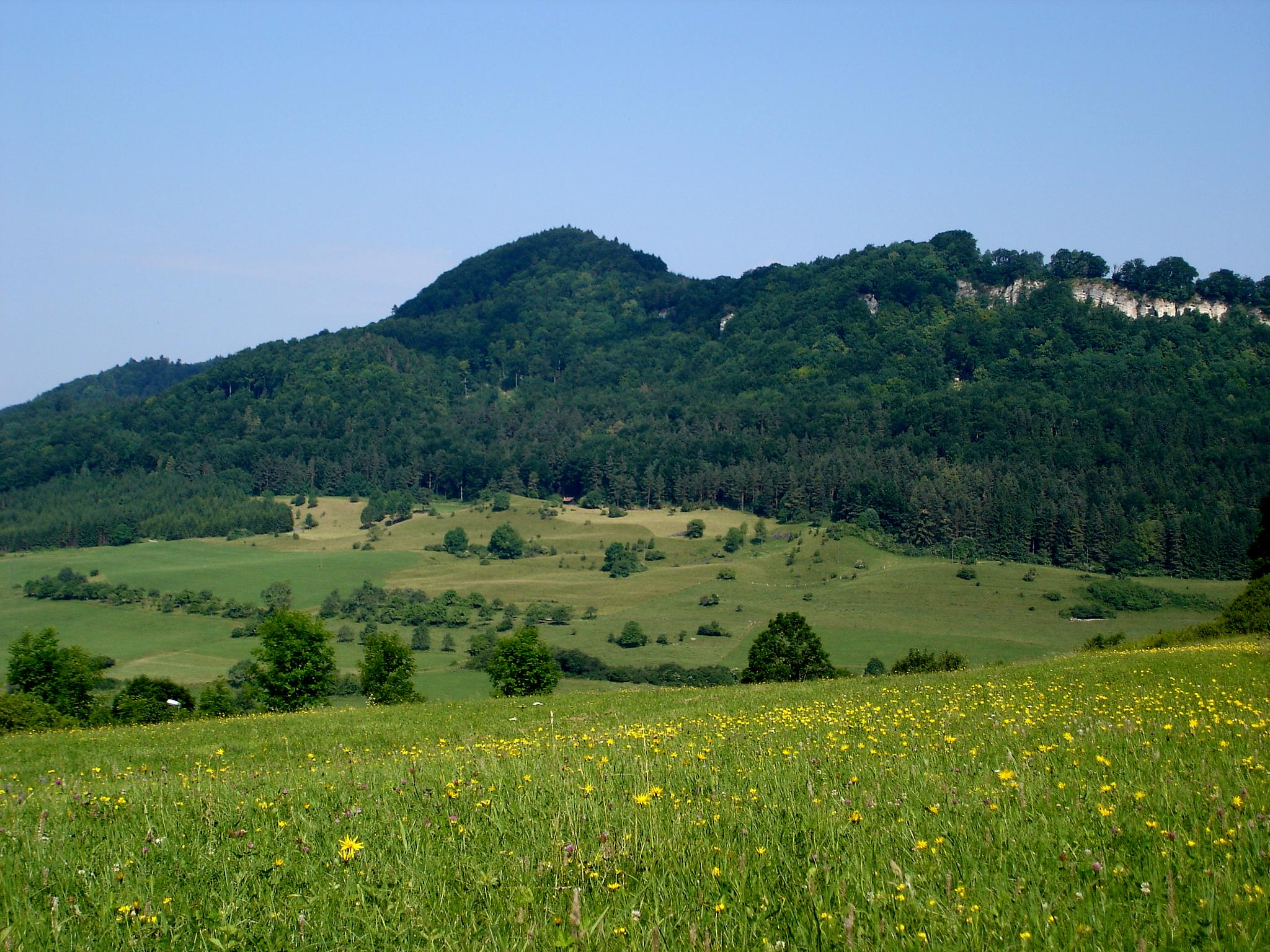

Highest point
- Elevation: 964 m (3,163 ft)

Geography
- Location: Zollernalbkreis, Baden-Württemberg, Germany

Heersberg is a mountain of Baden-Württemberg, Germany. It is located in Zollernalbkreis.
