= Luginsland =

Mountain in Baden-Württemberg, Germany

Coordinates: 47°48′07″N 7°36′36″E

Luginsland (Müllheim)
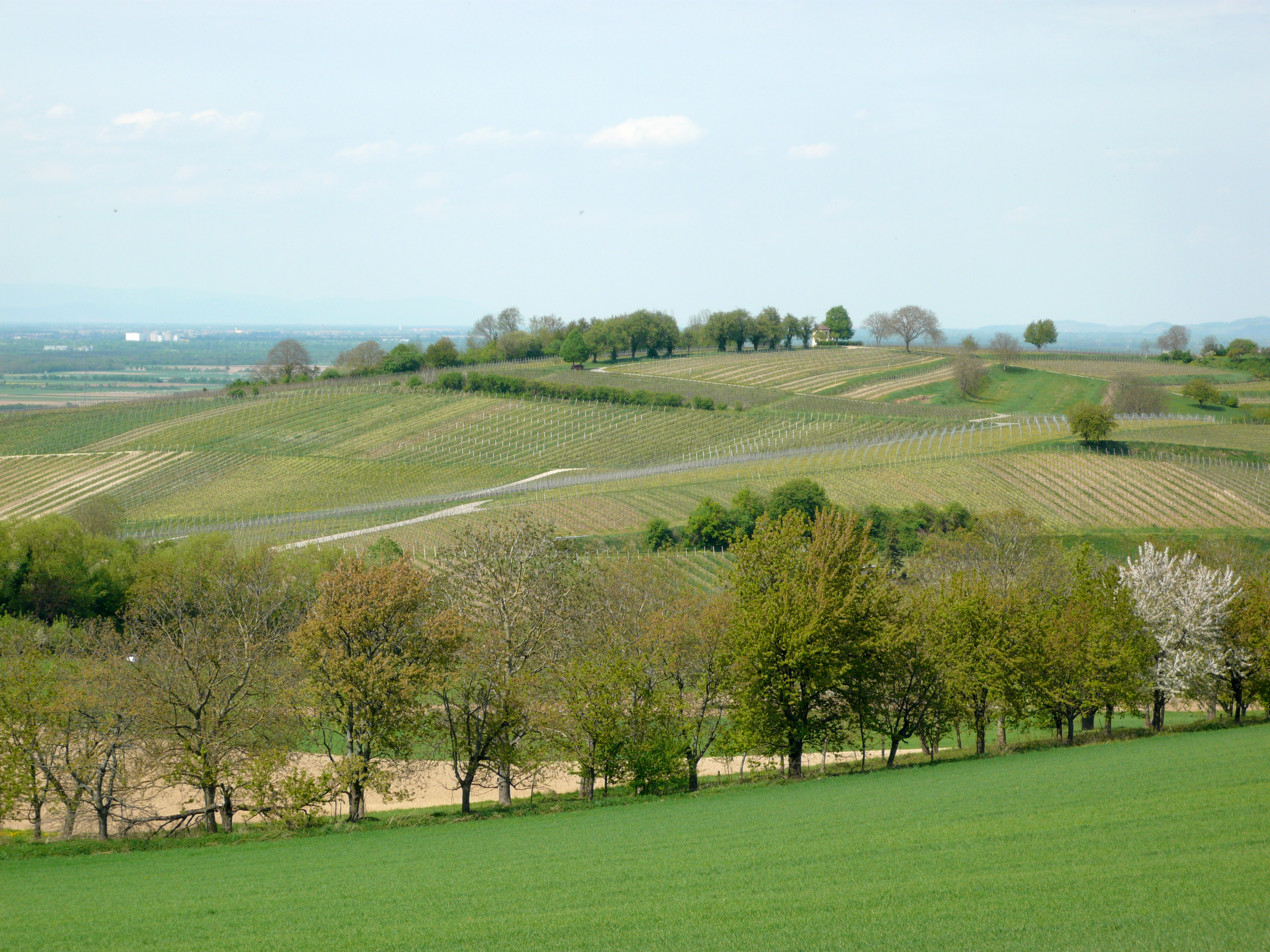
- The hill "Luginsland" near Muellheim

Highest point
- Elevation: 343.1 m (1,126 ft)

Geography
- Location: Baden-Württemberg, Germany

Luginsland (Müllheim) is a mountain of Baden-Württemberg, Germany.
