= Schnarrenberg (Tübingen) =

Coordinates: 48°31′50″N 9°02′24″E

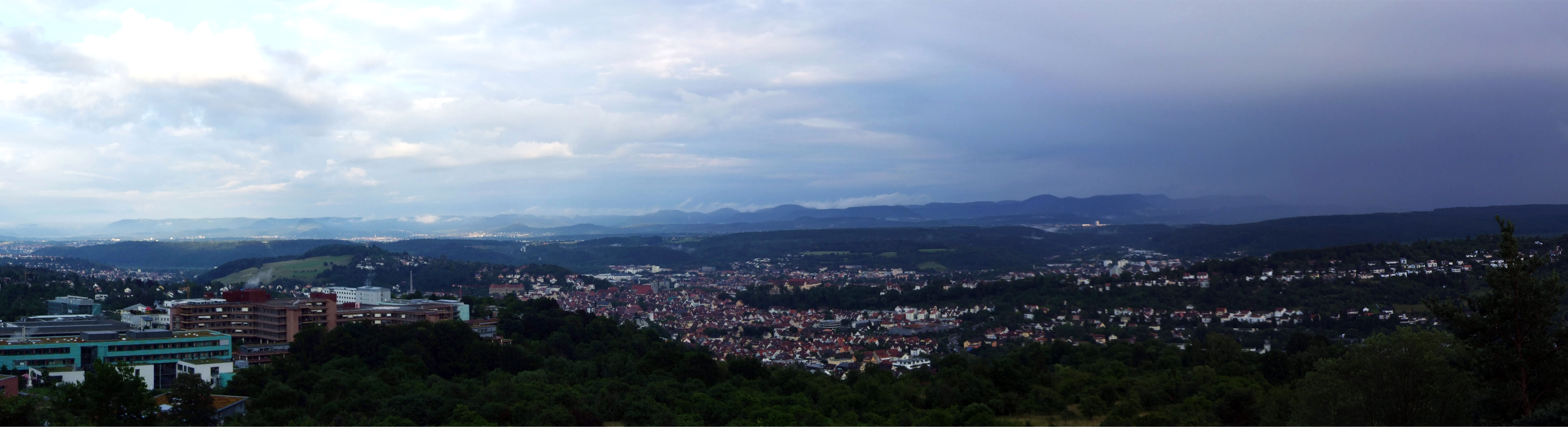
- View from the Steinenberg tower past the Schnarrenberg (left) with the University Hospital Tübingen (UKT) and across Tübingen in an east-southeast direction to the Swabian Jura.

Geography
- Location: Baden-Württemberg, Germany

Schnarrenberg (Tübingen) is a mountain of Baden-Württemberg, Germany.
