= Deutenberg =

Coordinates: 48°04′N 8°33′E

Highest point
- Elevation: 714 m (2,343 ft)

Geography
- Location: Baden-Württemberg, Germany

Deutenberg is a mountain of Baden-Württemberg, Germany.
