= Braunhardsberg =

Coordinates: 48°14′45″N 9°00′23″E

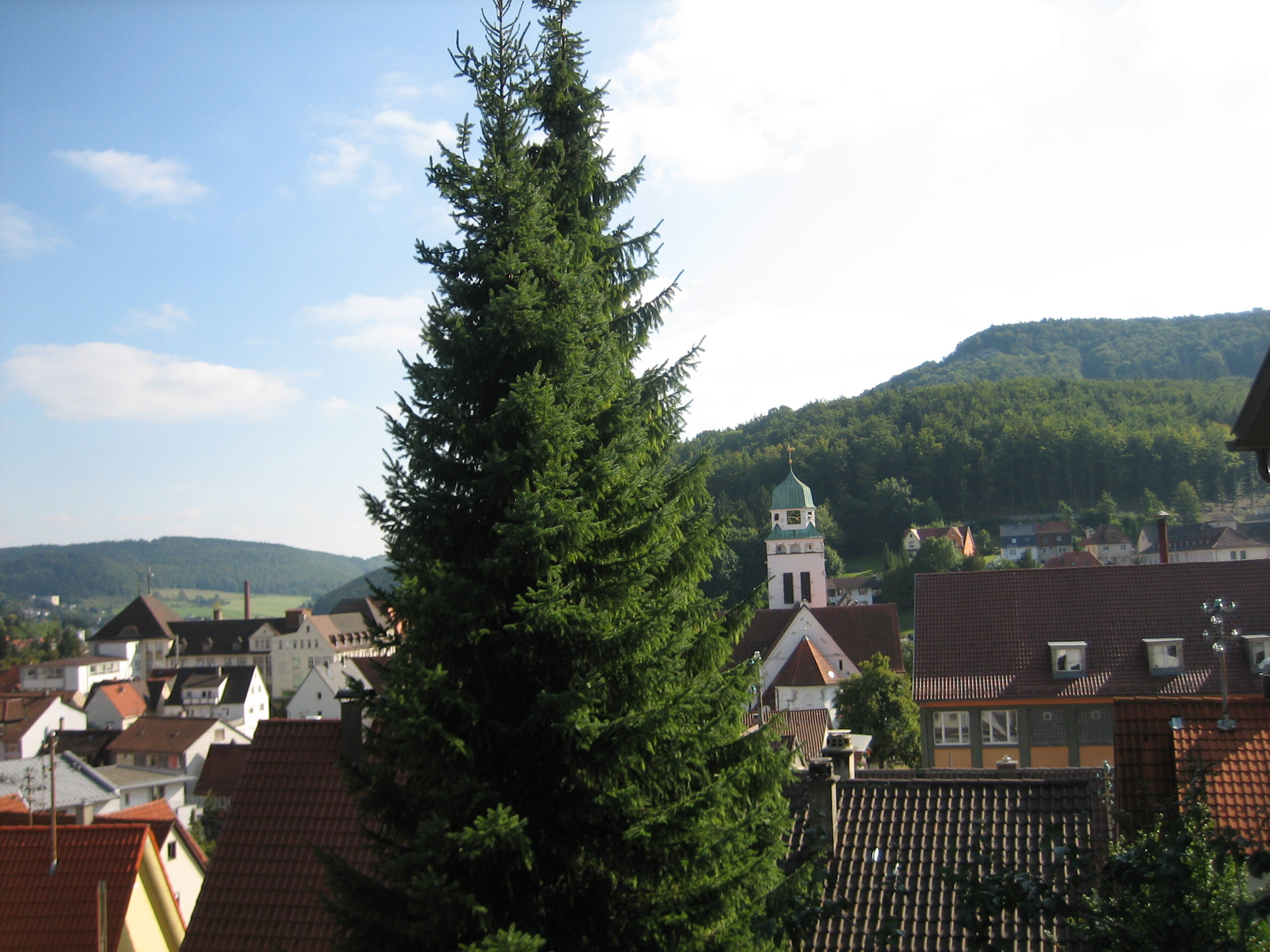
- Photo showing Braunhardsberg mountain in the background

Highest point
- Elevation: 969 m (3,179 ft)

Geography
- Location: Zollernalbkreis, Baden-Württemberg, Germany

Braunhardsberg is a mountain of Baden-Württemberg, Germany. It is located in Zollernalbkreis. It is known for its height of 969 meters and as a place of meaning in the region, as it is a popular place for hiking. It provides a great view of the Heersberg plateau in the west.
