= Filsenberg =

Mountain in Baden-Württemberg, Germany

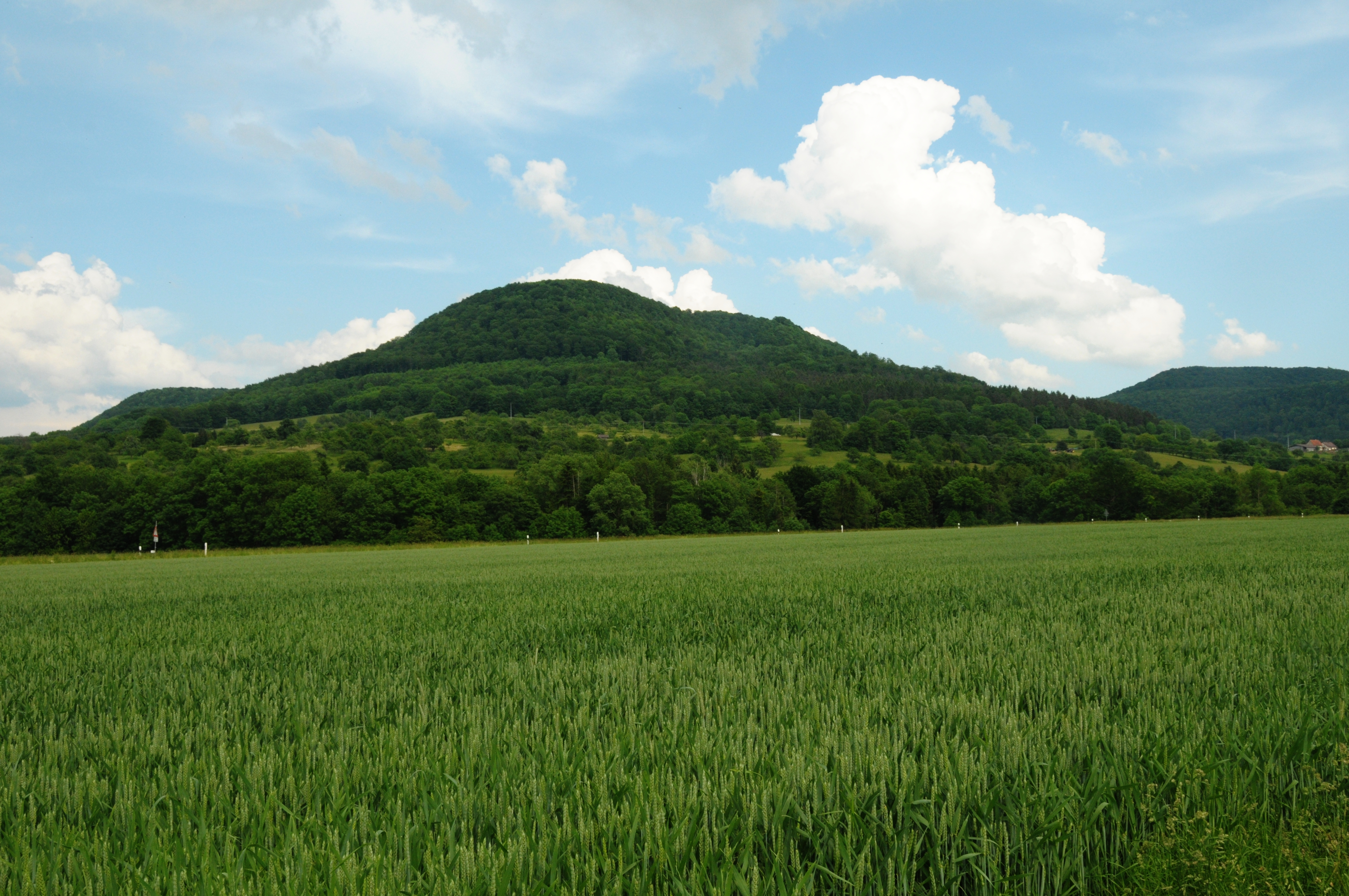

Highest point
- Elevation: 805 m (2,641 ft)
- Coordinates: 48°24′0″N 9°7′0″E

Geography
- Location: Baden-Württemberg, Germany

Filsenberg is a mountain of Baden-Württemberg, Germany.
