= Hasenberg (Stuttgart) =

Mountain in Stuttgart, Germany

Coordinates: 48°45′50″N 9°08′27″E

Geography
- Location: Baden-Württemberg, Germany

Hasenberg (Stuttgart) is a mountain of Baden-Württemberg, Germany.
