= Eichelberg (Odenwald) =

Mountain in Baden-Wurttemberg, Germany

Coordinates: 49°29′58″N 8°44′40″E

Highest point
- Elevation: 524.9 m (1,722 ft)

Geography
- Location: Baden-Württemberg, Germany

Eichelberg (Odenwald) is a mountain of Baden-Württemberg, Germany.
