= Goldkopf =

Coordinates: 49°32′01″N 8°41′40″E

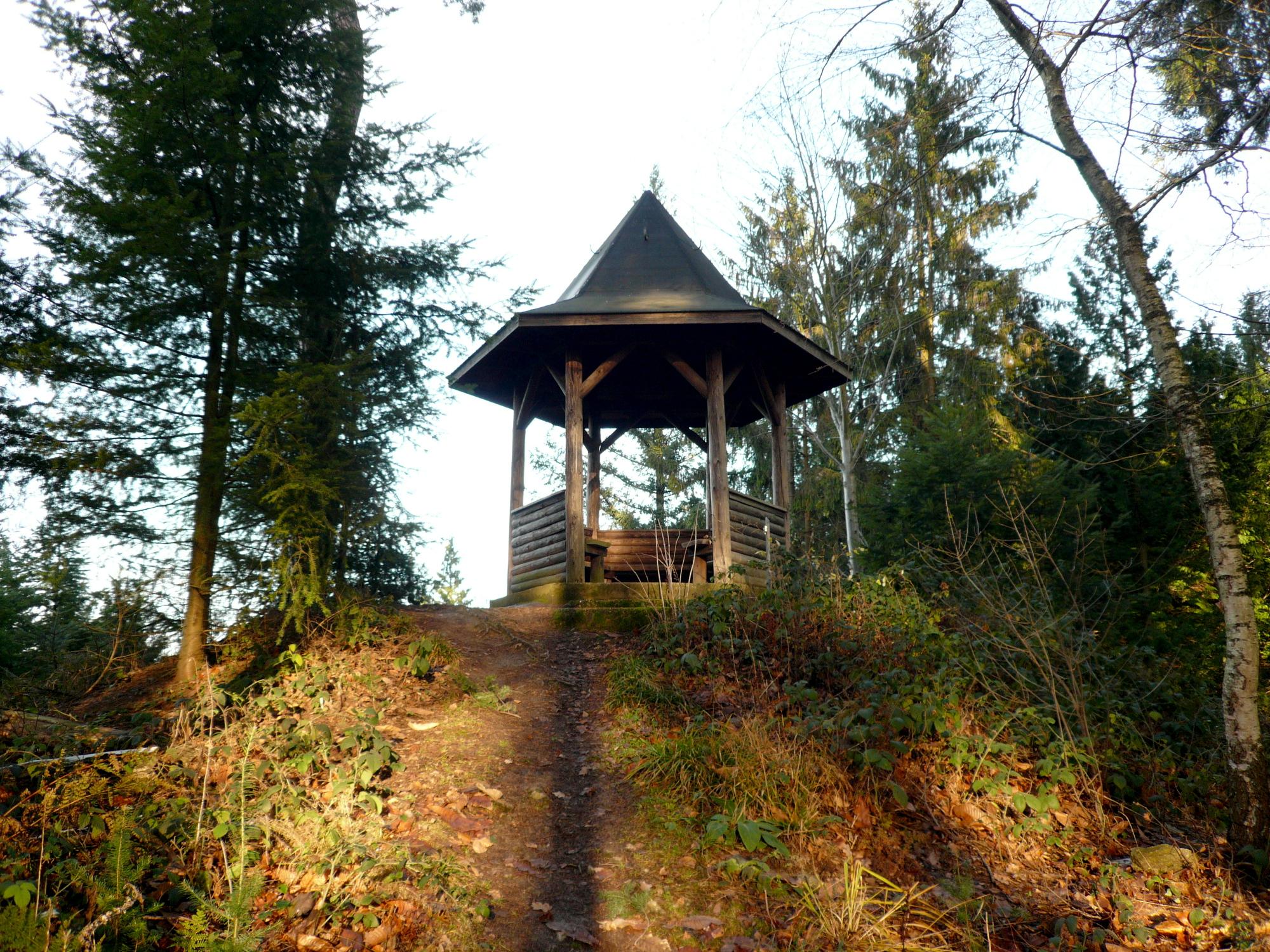
- Summit of Goldkopf

Highest point
- Elevation: 324 m (1,063 ft)

Geography
- Location: Baden-Württemberg, Germany

Goldkopf (Gold Head) is a mountain of Baden-Württemberg, Germany. It is 324 m above sea level.
