= Nimberg =

Mountain in Baden-Württemberg, Germany

Coordinates: 48°05′20″N 7°46′38″E

Highest point
- Elevation: 254 m (833 ft)

Geography
- Location: Baden-Württemberg, Germany

Nimberg is a mountain of Baden-Württemberg, Germany.
