= Baden-Württemberg =

State in southwest Germany

- State
- Flag Coat of arms Brandmark

- Location of Baden-Württemberg in Germany
- Interactive map of Baden-Württemberg
- Coordinates: 48°32′16″N 9°2′28″E
- Country: Germany
- Founded: 25 April 1952
- Capital (and largest city): Stuttgart

Government
  - Body: Landtag of Baden-Württemberg
  - Minister-President: Cem Özdemir (Green)
  - Governing parties: Greens / CDU
  - Bundesrat votes: 6 (of 69)
  - Bundestag seats: 79 (of 630) (as of 2025)

Area
  - Total: 35,747.85 km^{2} (13,802.32 sq mi)

Population (2020-09-30)
  - Total: 11,111,496 · 3rd
  - Density: 311/km^{2} (810/sq mi)

GDP
  - Total: €667.105 billion (2025)
  - Per capita: €59,233 (2025)
- Time zone: UTC+1 (CET)
  - Summer (DST): UTC+2 (CEST)
- ISO 3166 code: DE-BW
- NUTS Region: DE1
- HDI (2022): 0.963 very high · 3rd
- Website: baden-wuerttemberg.de

A campaign sticker developed by Scholz & Friends, translated, "We can [do] anything. Except [speak] Standard German." That is an allusion to Baden-Württemberg being one of the principal centres for innovation in Germany and having its own distinctive dialects.

Baden-Württemberg (/ˌbɑːdən ˈvɜːrtəmbɜːrɡ/ BAH-dən VURT-əm-burg; German: [ˌbaːdn̩ ˈvʏʁtəmbɛʁk]), commonly shortened to BW or BaWü, is a landlocked state (Land) in Southwest Germany, east of the Rhine, which forms the southern part of the country's western border with France. With more than 11.07 million inhabitants as of 2019 across a total area of nearly 35,752 km^{2} (13,804 sq mi), it is the third-largest German state by both area (behind Bavaria and Lower Saxony) and population (behind North Rhine-Westphalia and Bavaria). The largest city in Baden-Württemberg is the state capital of Stuttgart, followed by Mannheim and Karlsruhe. Other major cities are Freiburg im Breisgau, Heidelberg, Heilbronn, Konstanz, Pforzheim, Reutlingen, Tübingen, and Ulm.

Modern Baden-Württemberg includes the historical territories of Baden, Prussian Hohenzollern, and Württemberg. Baden-Württemberg became a state of West Germany in April 1952 through the merger of South Baden, Württemberg-Baden, and Württemberg-Hohenzollern. These states had been created by the Allies as they separated traditional states into occupation zones after World War II.

Baden-Württemberg is especially known for its strong economy with various industries like car manufacturing, electrical engineering, mechanical engineering, the service sector, and more. Ranking third among the German states by gross regional product (GRP), first by exports, first by research and development spending, and first by patent applications, Baden-Württemberg is considered one of the most prosperous regions in Europe and among the most innovative in the world. Part of the Four Motors for Europe and located in the Blue Banana, some of the largest German companies are headquartered in Baden-Württemberg, including Mercedes-Benz Group, Schwarz Group, Porsche, Bosch and SAP.

Culturally, Baden-Württemberg is known for its wine regions of Baden and Württemberg, the Cannstatter Volksfest (the second-largest Volksfest after Bavaria's Oktoberfest), the famous Hockenheimring race track, and its traditional Swabian cuisine, with the Black Forest and Lake Constance being popular tourist destinations. The state is home to many renowned universities, as well as Germany's supreme constitutional court, the Bundesverfassungsgericht, in Karlsruhe. The sobriquet Ländle, a diminutive of the word Land in the local Swabian, Alemannic and Franconian dialects, is sometimes used as a synonym for Baden-Württemberg.

== History ==
Baden-Württemberg is formed from the historical territories of Württemberg, Baden and Prussian Hohenzollern. Baden spans along the flat right bank of the river Rhine from north-west to the south (Lake Constance) of the present state, whereas Württemberg and Hohenzollern lie more inland and hillier, including areas such as the Swabian Jura mountain range. The Black Forest formed part of the border between Baden and Württemberg.

In 100 AD, the Roman Empire invaded and occupied Württemberg, constructing a limes (Note: A fortified boundary zone) along its northern borders. Over the course of the third century AD, the Alemanni forced the Romans to retreat west beyond the Rhine and Danube rivers. In 496 AD the Alemanni were defeated by a Frankish invasion led by Clovis I.

The Holy Roman Empire was later established. The majority of people in this region continued to be Roman Catholics, even after the Protestant Reformation influenced populations in northern Germany.

In the late 18th and early 19th century, Künzelsau, the capital of the Hohenlohe district, became the centre of emigration to the UK of pork butchers and bacon factors. The pioneers noticed a niche for speciality pork products in the rapidly growing English cities, especially those in the industrial centre and North. Many married local women and sent word home that a good living could be made in England; others followed.

In the late 19th and early 20th centuries, numerous people emigrated from this primarily rural area to the United States for economic reasons.

=== 20th century to present ===
At the beginning of the 20th century, the territory of modern-day Baden-Württemberg consisted of the Grand Duchy of Baden, (Note: Capital: Karlsruhe) the Kingdom of Württemberg (Note: Capital: Stuttgart) and the province of Hohenzollern (Note: Capital: Sigmaringen) of the Kingdom of Prussia. Since 1871, these had been part of the German Empire. In the aftermath of World War I and as part of the German revolution of 1918, the monarchs of Baden, (Note: The last monarch being Frederick II, Grand Duke of Baden) Württemberg (Note: The last monarch being William II of Württemberg) and Prussia (Note: The last monarch being the German emperor, William II of Prussia) were deposed, and these states became democratic republics: the Republic of Baden, the Free People's State of Württemberg and the Free State of Prussia.

Following Adolf Hitler becoming chancellor of Germany in 1933, the democratic institutions of Baden, Württemberg and Prussia were abolished as part of the Gleichschaltung.

After World War II, the Allies established three states in the territory of modern-day Baden-Württemberg: (South) Baden, (Note: Consisting of the southern part of Baden. Capital: Freiburg.) Württemberg-Baden (Note: Consisting of the northern parts of Baden and Württemberg. Capital: Stuttgart.) and Württemberg-Hohenzollern. (Note: Consisting of the southern part of Württemberg, and the former Prussian province of Hohenzollern. Capital: Tübingen.) Baden and Württemberg-Hohenzollern were occupied by France, while Württemberg-Baden was occupied by the United States. The new artificial borders were a consequence of France requesting its own occupation zone in Germany after World War II, and the Americans' wish to keep the A8 motorway, which spans east-west across northern Baden and northern Württemberg, wholly within their occupation zone.

In 1949, each state became a founding member of the Federal Republic of Germany (West Germany), with Article 118 of the German constitution providing an accession procedure. On 9 December 1951, a referendum was held in Württemberg-Baden, Württemberg-Hohenzollern and (South) Baden over a possible merger, or the restoration of the former pre-war states. There was strong support for the merger in Württemberg and Hohenzollern, but opposition in Baden. While a majority in the historic area of Baden (52%) voted to restore the former pre-war states, the majority of voters overall (69%) voted in favor of a merger. Baden-Württemberg officially became a state on 25 April 1952.

There were still opponents to the merger of Baden and Württemberg, however. In 1956 the Federal Constitutional Court decided that the population of Baden should have their say in a separate referendum. The second referendum was delayed, however, and the Federal Constitutional Court decided in 1969 that another referendum should be held by 30 June 1970. The referendum in the historic area of Baden was finally held on 7 June 1970, with 81.9% of the voters voting in favour of the merger of Baden and Württemberg.

== Geography ==
Baden-Württemberg shares borders with the German states of Rhineland-Palatinate, Hesse, and Bavaria, and also shares borders with France (Alsace, within the region of Grand Est), and Switzerland (cantons of Basel-Landschaft, Basel-Stadt, Aargau, Zürich, Schaffhausen and Thurgau).

Most of the major cities of Baden-Württemberg straddle the banks of the Neckar River, which has its source in Villingen-Schwenningen and runs downstream (from southwest to the centre, then northwest) through the state past Tübingen, Stuttgart, Heilbronn, Heidelberg, and Mannheim.

The Rhine (German: Rhein) forms the western border as well as large portions of the southern border. The Black Forest (Schwarzwald), the central mountain range of the state, rises east of the Upper Rhine valley. The high plateau of the Swabian Alb, between the Neckar, the Black Forest, and the Danube, is an essential European watershed. Baden-Württemberg shares Lake Constance (Bodensee, also known regionally as the Swabian Sea) with Switzerland, Austria and Bavaria, the international borders within its waters not being clearly defined. It shares the foothills of the Alps (known as the Allgäu) with Bavaria and the Austrian Vorarlberg, but Baden-Württemberg itself has no mainland border with Austria.

The Danube is conventionally taken to be formed by the confluence of the two streams Brigach and Breg just east of Donaueschingen. The source of the Donaubach, which flows into the Danube, in Donaueschingen is often referred to as the "source of the Danube" (Donauquelle). Hydrologically, the source of the Danube is the source of the Breg as the larger of the two formative streams, which rises near Furtwangen.

The forests in this region are home to common pests such as Melolontha Hippocastrani, that cause damage to the foliage and soil.

=== Mountains ===
- Augstberg
- Belchen (Schwarzwald)
- Blasenberg (Swabian Jura)
- Blauer Stein
- Blößling (Schwarzwald)
- Braunhardsberg
- Deutenberg
- Eichelberg (Odenwald)
- Feldberg (Schwarzwald)
- Filsenberg
- Geissberg
- Goldkopf
- Haigern
- Hardberg (Schwarzwald)
- Hasenberg (Stuttgart)
- Heersberg
- Heiligenkopf
- Herzogenhorn
- Himberg (Swabian Jura)
- Hochkopf (Northern Black Forest)
- Hochkopf (Southern Black Forest)
- Irrenberg
- Kammertenberg
- Luginsland
- Nimberg
- Pfaffenberg (Wendelsheim)
- Schnarrenberg
- Teckberg

=== Hills ===
- Lemberg (Affalterbach)

== Climate ==
Baden-Württemberg is–along with Bavaria–the southernmost part of Germany.

The climate across the states varies. This is mostly due to a high amount of mountains and highlands inside of the state. Most parts in the western parts (Baden) lower than 500–800 metres (1,600–2,600 ft) enjoy an almost year round mild oceanic climate (cfb in Köppen classification). The climate in the eastern parts of the state is more continental. For instance, winters in the city of Ulm are colder than in Berlin. While winters in the warmest areas often lack snow, the Black Forest, Swabian Alb and the Alps tend to get snow frequently, especially in areas of high elevation. Summers here have more rain than in the valleys, but winters tend to have more sun.

Due to the differences of the landscapes, average annual temperatures reach from only 5 °C (41 °F) in the microclimates of Black Forest and Allgäu up to 13 °C (55 °F) in the Upper Rhine Valley.

Climate data for Karlsruhe (1991–2020), 115 Meters, 377.3 ft
Month	Jan	Feb	Mar	Apr	May	Jun	Jul	Aug	Sep	Oct	Nov	Dec	Year
Mean daily maximum °C (°F)	5.1 (41.2)	7.2 (45.0)	12.1 (53.8)	17.2 (63.0)	21.0 (69.8)	24.5 (76.1)	26.6 (79.9)	26.4 (79.5)	21.6 (70.9)	15.5 (59.9)	9.2 (48.6)	5.6 (42.1)	16.0 (60.8)
Daily mean °C (°F)	2.6 (36.7)	3.7 (38.7)	7.3 (45.1)	11.4 (52.5)	15.3 (59.5)	18.8 (65.8)	20.8 (69.4)	20.6 (69.1)	16.3 (61.3)	11.4 (52.5)	6.4 (43.5)	3.4 (38.1)	11.5 (52.7)
Mean daily minimum °C (°F)	0.0 (32.0)	0.2 (32.4)	2.6 (36.7)	5.5 (41.9)	9.7 (49.5)	13.1 (55.6)	15.0 (59.0)	14.7 (58.5)	11.0 (51.8)	7.3 (45.1)	3.5 (38.3)	1.2 (34.2)	7.0 (44.6)
Average precipitation mm (inches)	40.0 (1.57)	36.9 (1.45)	40.1 (1.58)	38.9 (1.53)	63.7 (2.51)	61.7 (2.43)	66.7 (2.63)	76.5 (3.01)	48.7 (1.92)	49.5 (1.95)	52.6 (2.07)	52.2 (2.06)	627.5 (24.71)
Average precipitation days (≥ 0.1 mm)	14.9	13.3	13.3	10.9	13.7	12.9	14.0	12.5	11.5	13.6	14.7	16.9	162.2
Mean monthly sunshine hours	52.4	77.8	130.4	184.1	209.3	217.2	223.3	209.8	162.2	103.4	55.5	43.4	1,668.8
Source: weather-online

== Government ==
=== Administration ===
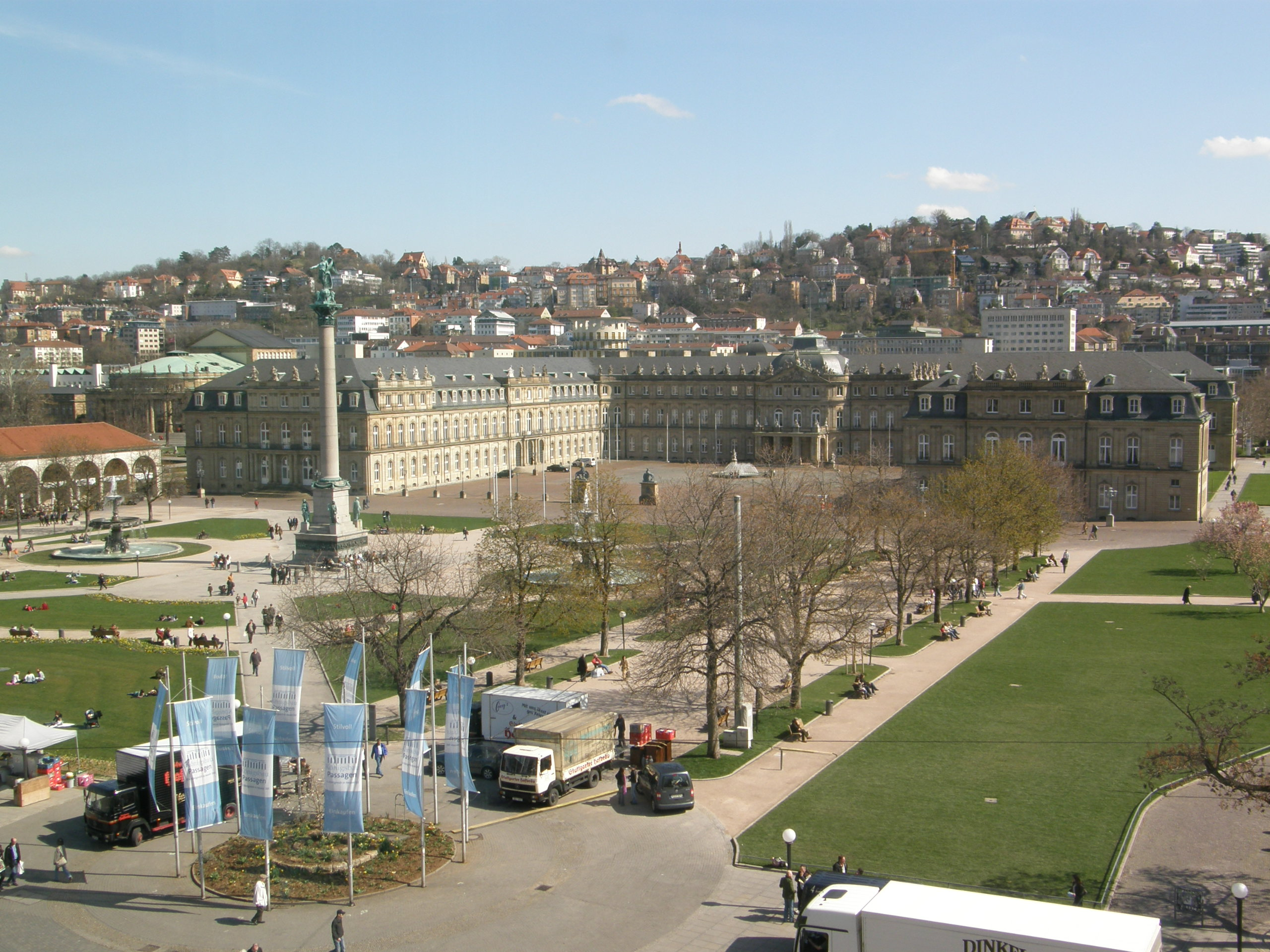
Stuttgart center with the Schlossplatz

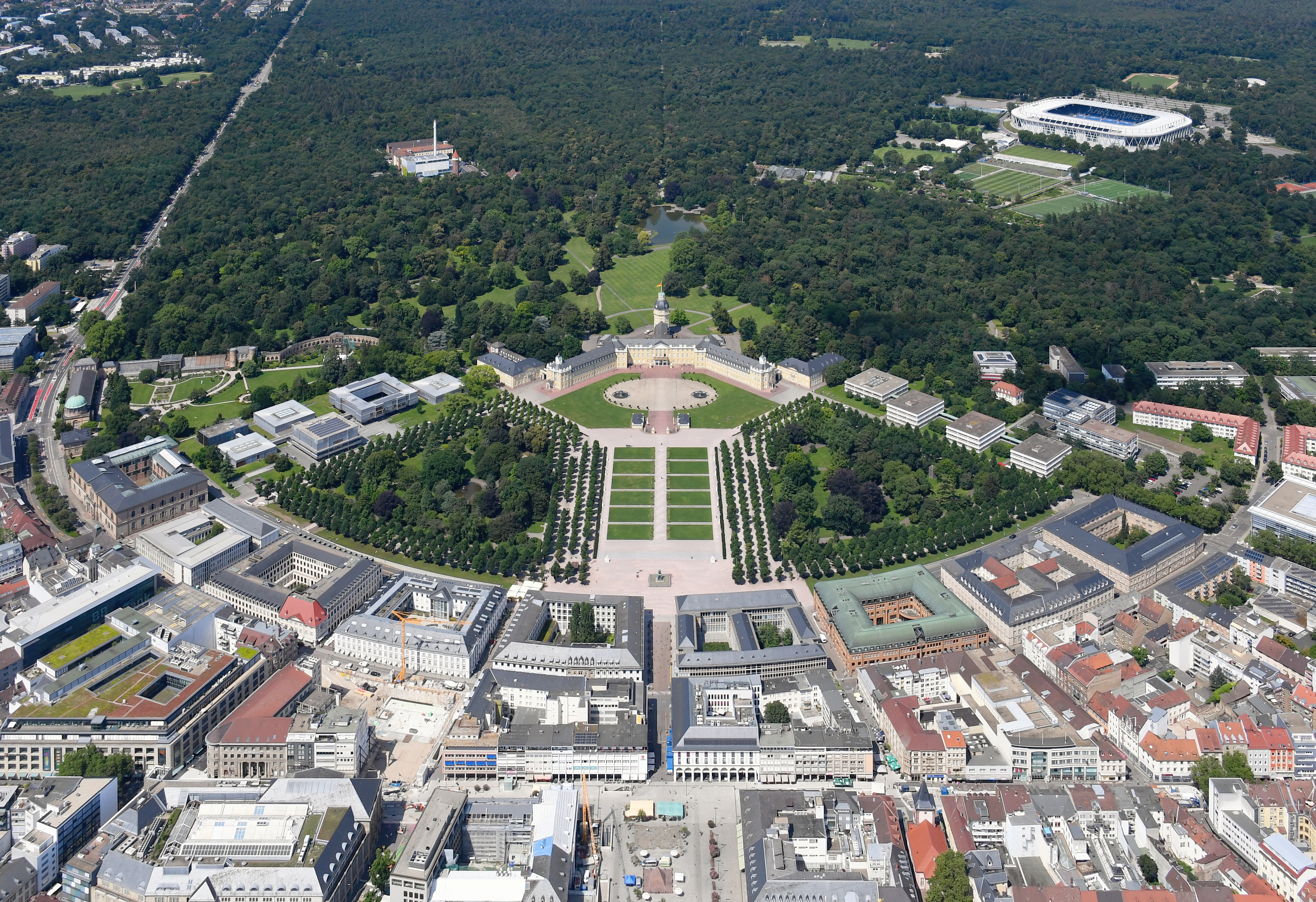
Karlsruhe

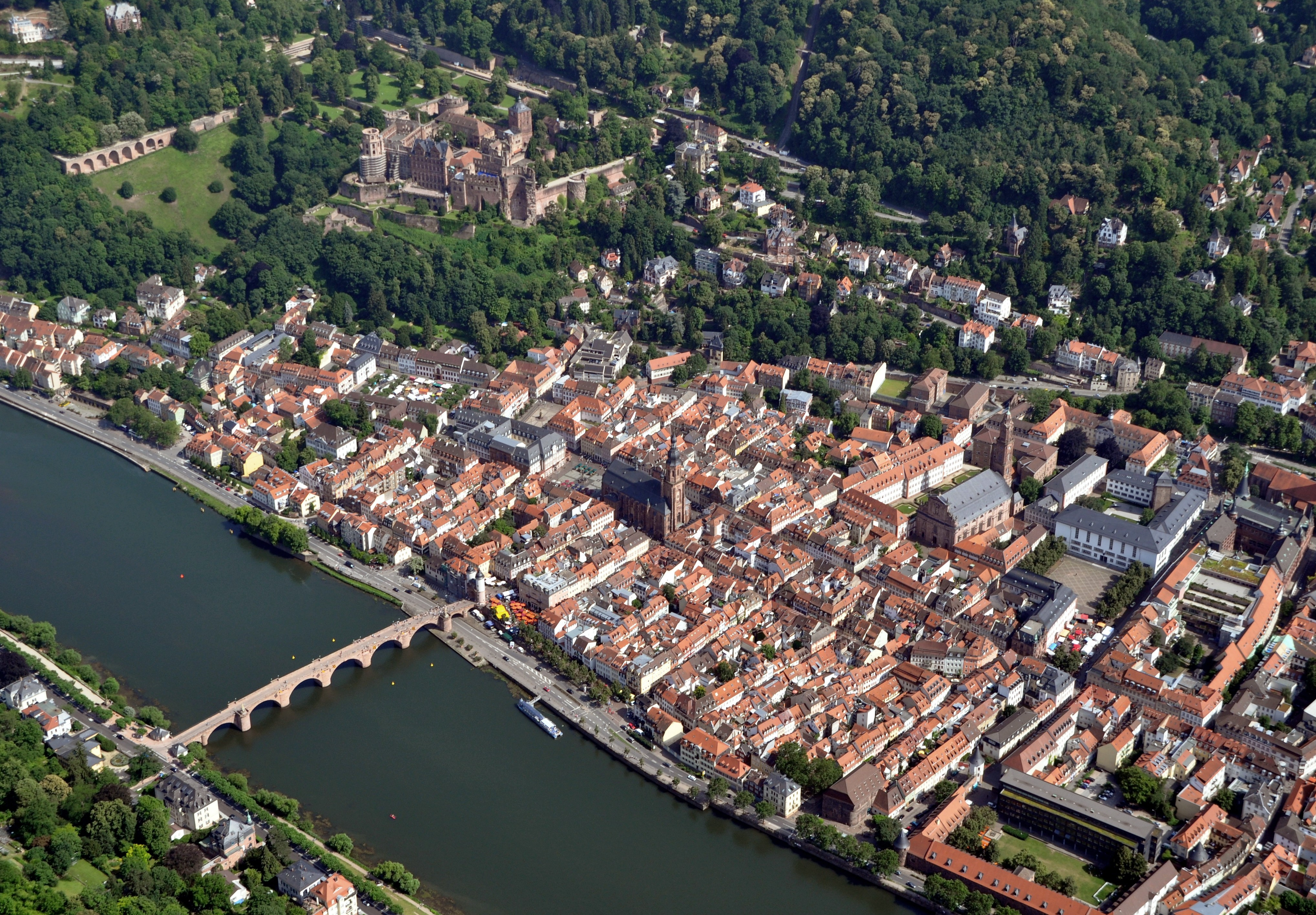
Heidelberg with the Neckar river and the vast Heidelberg Schloss (upper picture part)

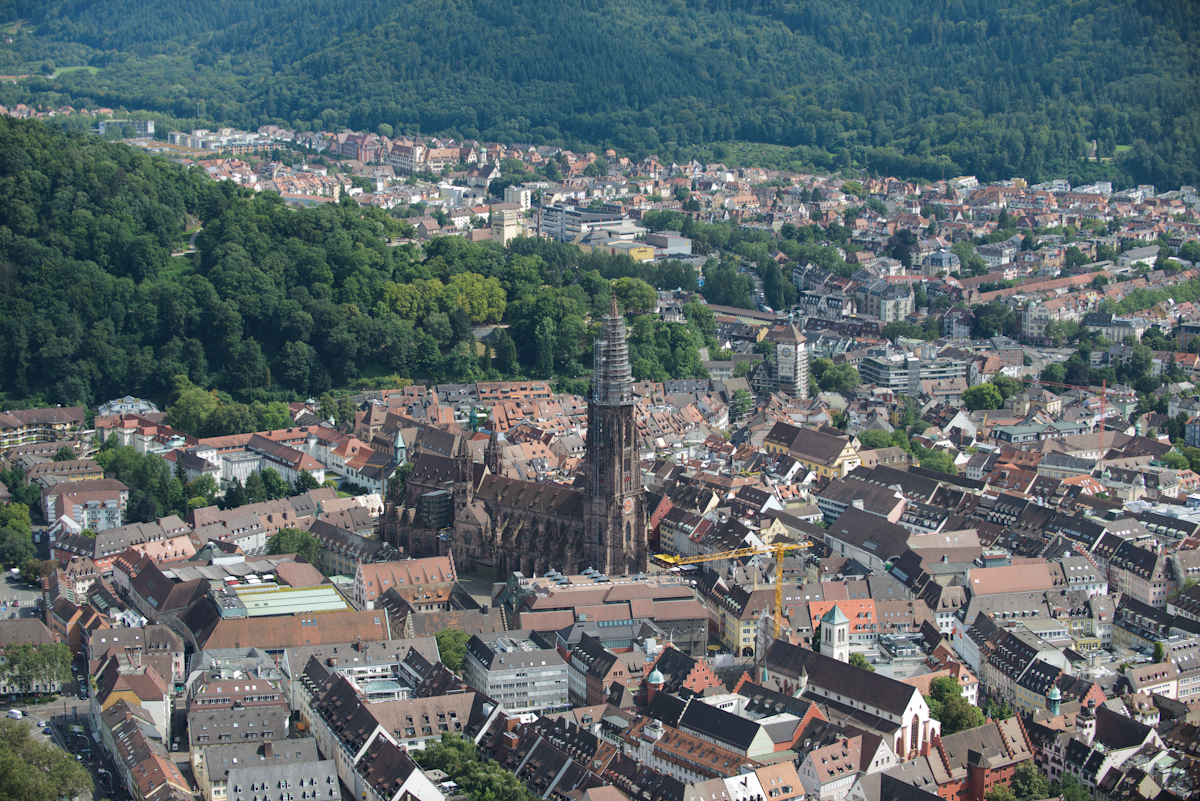
Freiburg with the Freiburg Minster

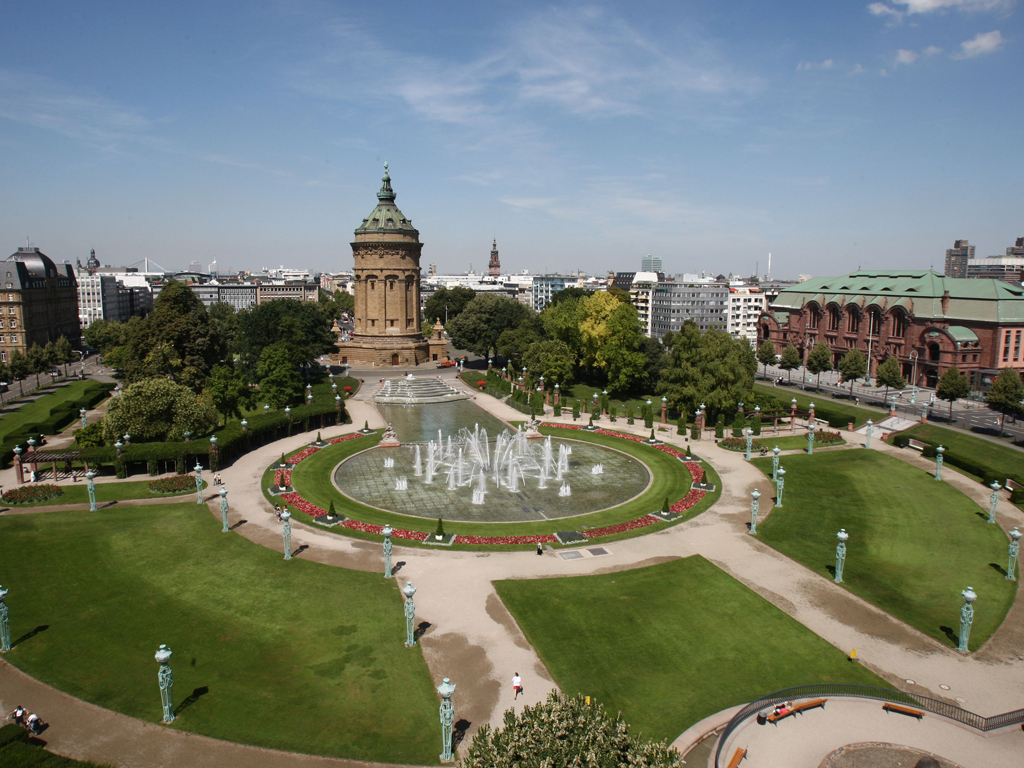
Mannheim

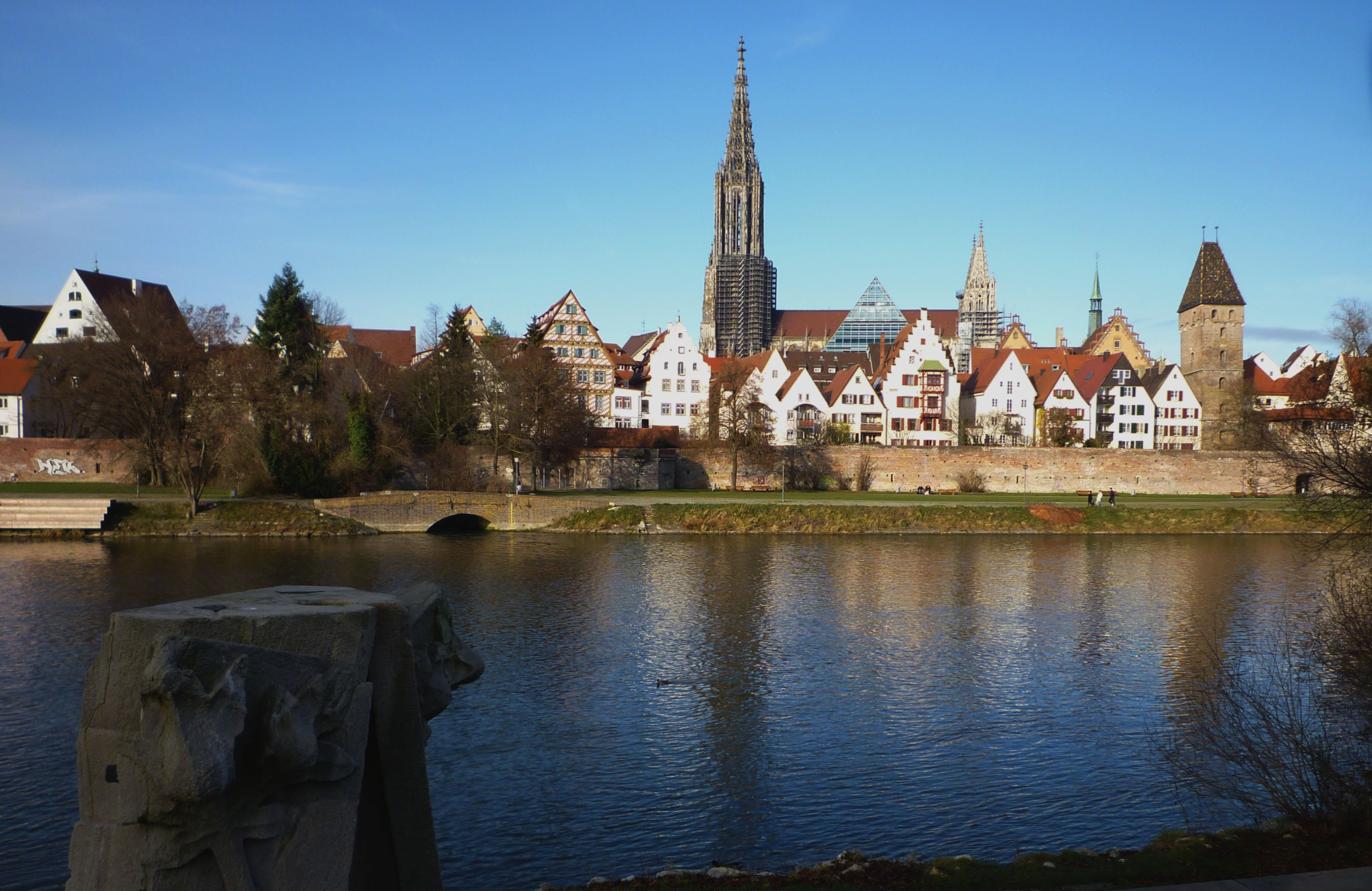
Ulm with the famous Ulm minster and the world's highest church tower

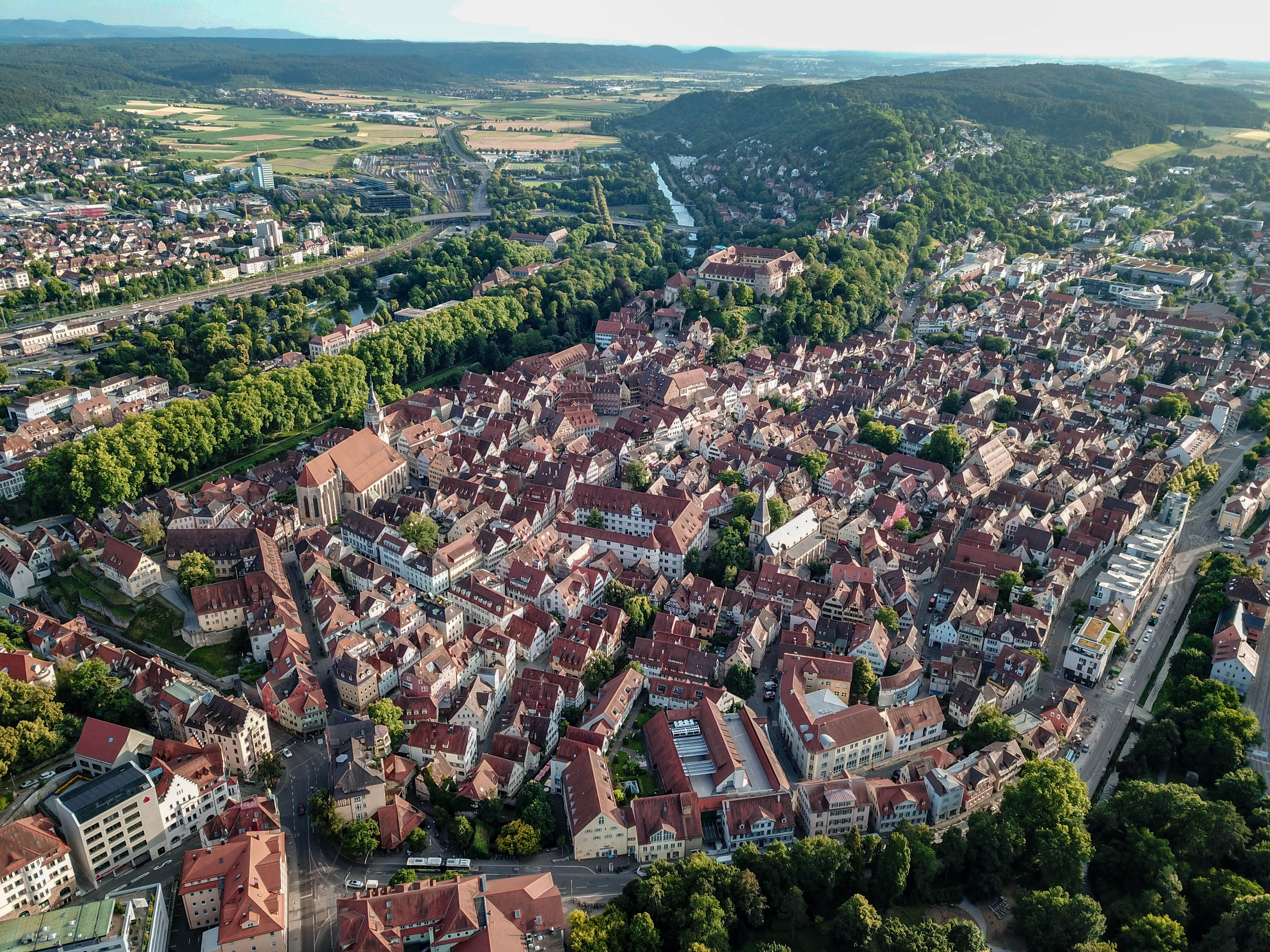
Tübingen

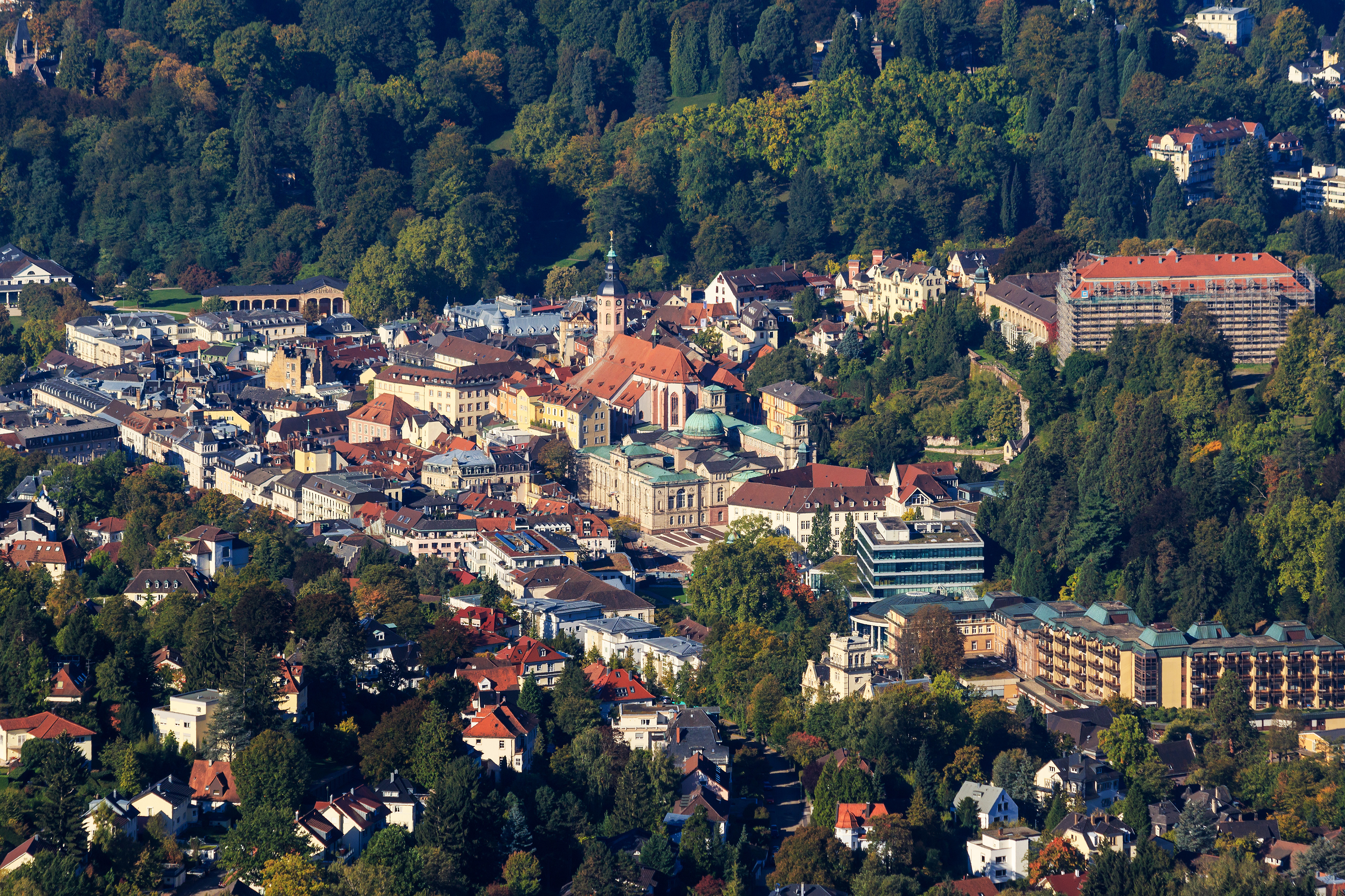
Baden-Baden

Baden-Württemberg is divided into thirty-five districts (Landkreise) and nine independent cities (Stadtkreise), both grouped into the four Administrative Districts (Regierungsbezirke) of Freiburg, Karlsruhe, Stuttgart, and Tübingen.

The 35 districts:

1. Alb-Donau-Kreis
2. Biberach
3. Bodenseekreis
4. Böblingen
5. Breisgau-Hochschwarzwald
6. Calw
7. Konstanz (Constance)
8. Emmendingen
9. Enzkreis
10. Esslingen
11. Freudenstadt
12. Göppingen
13. Heidenheim
14. Heilbronn
15. Hohenlohe
16. Karlsruhe
17. Lörrach
18. Ludwigsburg
19. Main-Tauber
20. Neckar-Odenwald-Kreis
21. Ortenaukreis
22. Ostalbkreis
23. Rastatt
24. Ravensburg
25. Rems-Murr-Kreis
26. Reutlingen
27. Rhein-Neckar-Kreis
28. Rottweil
29. Schwäbisch Hall
30. Schwarzwald-Baar-Kreis
31. Sigmaringen
32. Tübingen
33. Tuttlingen
34. Waldshut
35. Zollernalbkreis

Baden-Württemberg contains nine additional independent cities not belonging to any district:

Code	City (Stadtkreise)	Area (km^{2})	Population			Region (Regierungs- bezirk)
Code	City (Stadtkreise)	Area (km^{2})	1997	2007	2017	Region (Regierungs- bezirk)
A	Baden-Baden	140.18	52,672	54,853	54,718	Karlsruhe
B	Freiburg im Breisgau	153.06	200,519	219,430	229,636	Freiburg
C	Heidelberg	108.83	139,941	145,311	160,601	Karlsruhe
D	Heilbronn	99.88	120,987	121,627	125,113	Stuttgart
E	Karlsruhe	173.46	276,571	288,917	311,919	Karlsruhe
F	Mannheim	144.96	310,475	309,795	307,997	Karlsruhe
G	Pforzheim	98.02	118,079	119,423	124,289	Karlsruhe
H	Stuttgart	207.35	585,274	597,176	632,743	Stuttgart
I	Ulm	118.69	115,628	121,434	125,596	Tübingen

==== Other state institutions ====
The Baden-Württemberg General Auditing Office acts as an independent body to monitor public offices' correct use of public funds.

=== Politics ===
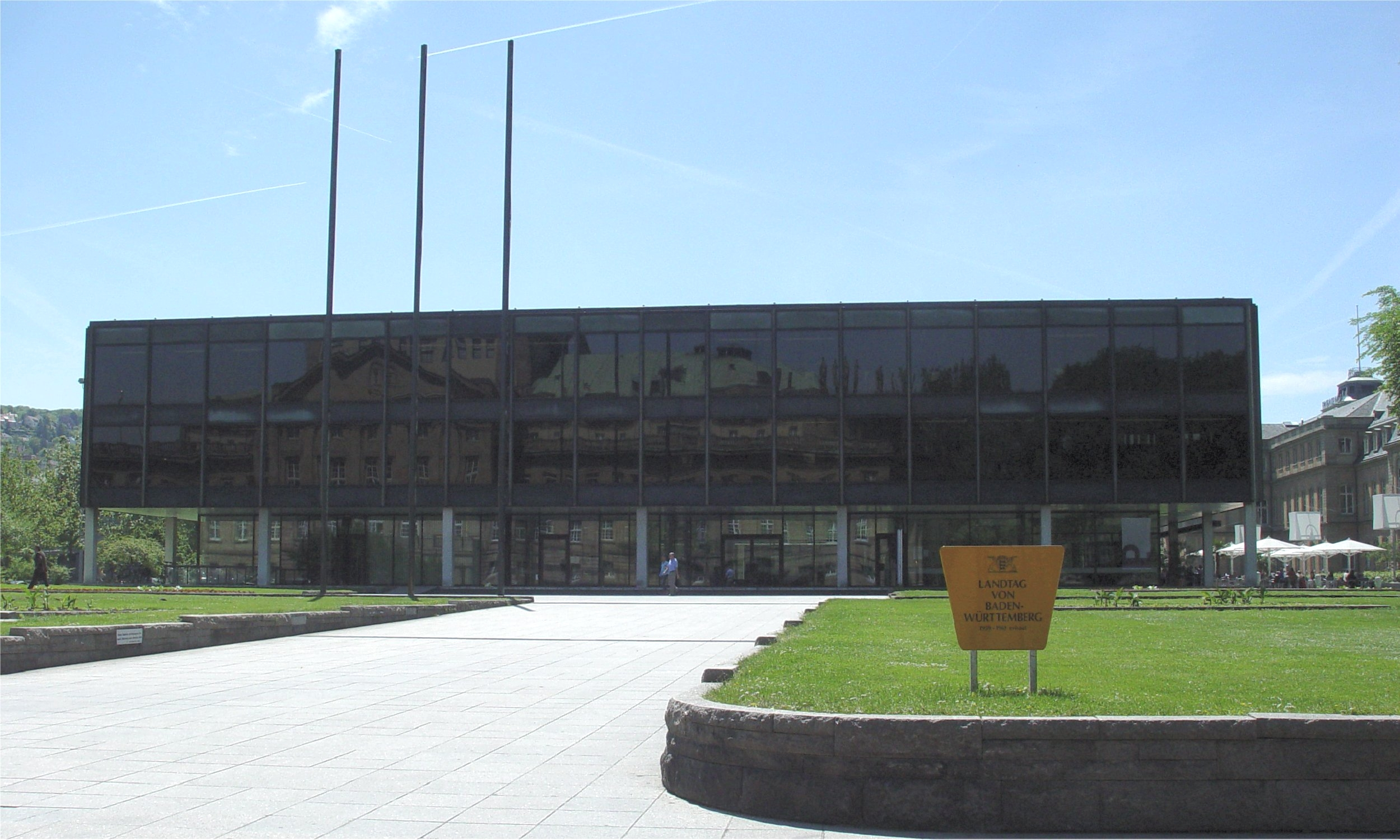
Baden-Württemberg state parliament in Stuttgart

The state parliament of Baden-Württemberg is the Landtag, located in Stuttgart. The state government is currently formed by a Greens-CDU coalition as the cabinet of Minister-President Cem Özdemir (Greens).

The politics of Baden-Württemberg have traditionally been dominated by the conservative Christian Democratic Union of Germany (CDU), which had led all but one government since 1952 until 2011. In the Landtag elections held on 27 March 2011, voters replaced the Christian Democrats and centre-right Free Democrats (FDP) coalition with an alliance of the Greens and Social Democrats (SPD), which secured a four-seat majority in the state parliament. The alliance elected the Greens-led first Kretschmann cabinet under Winfried Kretschmann because the Greens had surprisingly won 36 seats, one more than the Social Democrats' 35 seats. In the 2016 election, the popular Kretschmann and his Greens were reelected and, with their nationwide best result, turned out first place for the first time in any election in German history. However, because of the Social Democrats' heavy losses, the Greens formed a coalition government with the Christian Democrats, the second Kretschmann cabinet. After the elections in 2021 and 2026, the Greens-CDU coalition was upheld.

=== Most recent election results ===
Party	Party list			Constituency			Total seats	+/–
Party	Votes	%	Seats	Votes	%	Seats	Total seats	+/–
Alliance 90/The Greens	1,623,156	30.20	43	1,368,072	25.53	13	56	–2
Christian Democratic Union	1,595,844	29.69	0	1,837,543	34.29	56	56	+14
Alternative for Germany	1,010,449	18.80	34	1,009,819	18.84	1	35	+18
Social Democratic Party	298,278	5.55	10	450,169	8.40	0	10	–9
The Left	237,062	4.41	0	265,186	4.95	0	0	0
Free Democratic Party	235,599	4.38	0	256,168	4.78	0	0	–18
Free Voters	102,687	1.91	0	54,549	1.02	0	0	0
Sahra Wagenknecht Alliance	76,314	1.42	0	31,288	0.58	0	0	0
Tierschutzpartei	49,802	0.93	0	2,131	0.04	0	0	0
Volt	45,797	0.85	0	52,185	0.97	0	0	0
Die PARTEI	22,784	0.42	0	8,528	0.16	0	0	0
Grassroots Democratic Party of Germany	15,122	0.28	0	3,087	0.06	0	0	0
Alliance C – Christians for Germany	12,518	0.23	0	4,069	0.08	0	0	0
Values Union	11,304	0.21	0	4,651	0.09	0	0	0
Ecological Democratic Party	9,370	0.17	0	5,701	0.11	0	0	0
Pensioners' Party	9,009	0.17	0				0	0
The Justice Party	7,332	0.14	0	642	0.01	0	0	0
Party of Progress	3,670	0.07	0				0	0
Party for Rejuvenation Research	3,590	0.07	0				0	0
Klimaliste	2,790	0.05	0				0	0
Party of Humanists	2,357	0.04	0				0	0
Independents				5,088	0.09	0	0	0
Total	5,374,834	100.00	87	5,358,876	100.00	70	157	+3
Valid votes	5,374,834	99.41		5,358,876	99.11			
Invalid/blank votes	32,018	0.59		47,976	0.89			
Total votes	5,406,852	100.00		5,406,852	100.00			
Registered voters/turnout	7,773,341	69.56		7,773,341	69.56			
Source: wahlrecht.de

== Economy ==
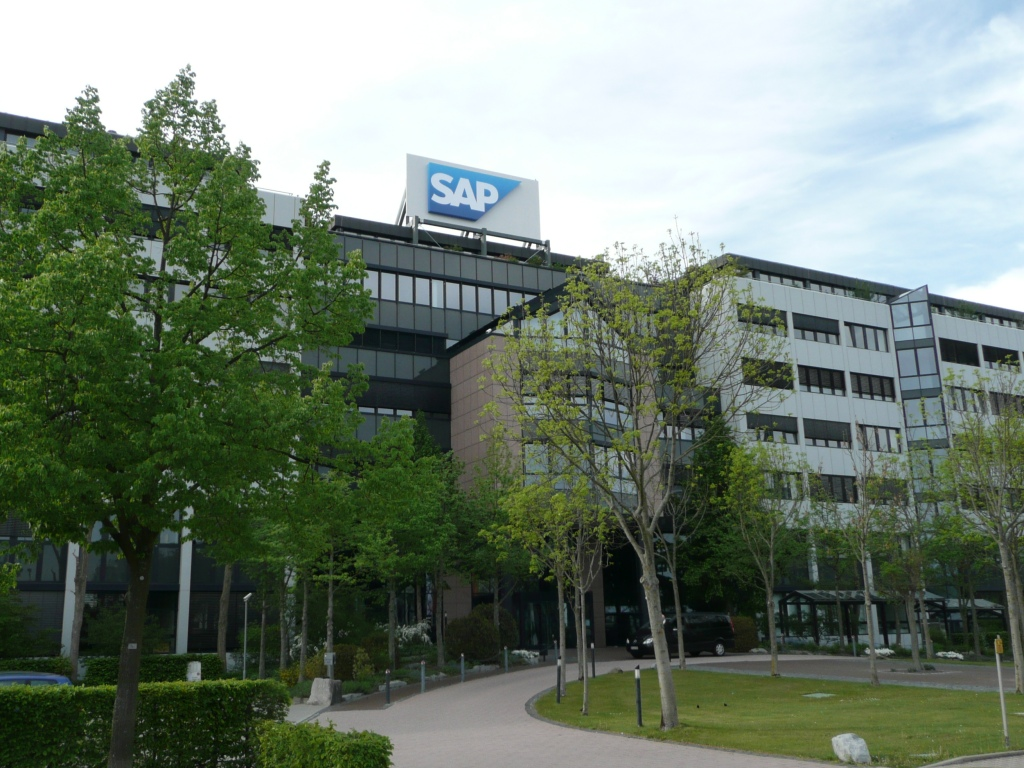
SAP headquarters in Walldorf

Although Baden-Württemberg has relatively few natural resources compared to other regions of Germany, the state is among the most prosperous and wealthiest regions in Europe, with a generally low unemployment rate historically. The state's economy benefits from and relies on its well-developed infrastructure. Apart from the city-states of Berlin, Bremen and Hamburg, Baden-Württemberg offers the fourth-shortest routes to trains and buses on average among all German states. Despite it not being predominantly reliant upon an industrial capacity, Baden-Württemberg is one of the strongest economic states in Germany.

Baden-Württemberg has the highest exports (2019) and third-highest imports (2020), the second-lowest unemployment rate with 4.3% (March 2021), the most patents pending per capita (2020), the second-highest absolute and highest relative number of companies considered "hidden champions", and the highest absolute and relative research and development expenditure (2017) among all states in Germany, as well as the highest measured Innovationsindex (2012), (Note: The Innovationsindex (innovation index) is an index developed by the Federal Statistical Office of Germany in Baden-Württemberg that features a variety of indicators for innovation in an identification number that enables a comparative assessment of the ability of innovation of 86 regions in the 27 member countries of the European Union.) making it the German state with the third-highest gross regional product (GRP) as of 2019 (behind North Rhine-Westphalia and Bavaria) with €524,325 billion (around US$636.268 billion). Baden-Württemberg also has the most employees (233,296) in the automotive industry of all German states as of 2018, as well as the third-highest number of motor vehicles of all German states (2020). If Baden-Württemberg were a sovereign country (2020), it would have an economy comparable to that of Sweden in terms of nominal gross domestic product (GDP).

A number of well-known enterprises are headquartered in the state, for example Mercedes-Benz Group, Porsche, Robert Bosch GmbH (automobile industry), Carl Zeiss AG (optics), SAP (Europe's most valuable brand as well as the largest non-American software enterprise) and Heidelberger Druckmaschinen (precision mechanical engineering). Despite this, Baden-Württemberg's economy is dominated by small and medium-sized enterprises, like most companies in German-speaking countries are. Although poor in workable natural resources (formerly lead, zinc, iron, silver, copper, and salts) and still very rural in some areas, the region is heavily industrialised overall. In 2003, there were almost 8,800 manufacturing enterprises with more than 20 employees, but only 384 with more than 500. There are 3,779 companies in Baden-Württemberg corporate family which come to 1000–5000 employees in total.

The latter category accounts for 43% of the 1.2 million persons employed in the industry. The Mittelstand or mid-sized company model is the backbone of the Baden-Württemberg economy. Medium-sized businesses and a tradition of branching into different industrial sectors have ensured specialisation over a wide range. A fifth of the "old" Federal Republic's industrial gross value added is generated by Baden-Württemberg. Turnover for manufacturing in 2003 exceeded 240,000 million, 43% of which came from exports. The region depends to some extent on global economic developments, though the great adaptability of the region's economy has generally helped it through crises. Half of the employees in the manufacturing industry are in mechanical and electrical engineering and automobile construction. This is also where the largest enterprises are to be found. The importance of the precision mechanics industry also extends beyond the region's borders, as does that of the optical, clock making, toy, metallurgy and electronics industries. The textile industry, which formerly dominated much of the region, has disappeared from Baden-Württemberg. Research and development (R&D) is funded jointly by the state and industry. In 2001, more than a fifth of the 100,000 or so persons working in R&D in Germany were located in Baden-Württemberg, most of them in the Stuttgart area. Baden-Württemberg is also the region with the highest GDP of the Four Motors for Europe.

A study performed in 2007 by the neo-liberal thinktank Initiative for New Social Market Economy and the trade newspaper Wirtschaftswoche awarded Baden-Württemberg for being the "economically most successful and most dynamic state" among the 16 states.

The unemployment rate stood at 3% in October 2018 and was the second lowest in Germany behind only Bavaria and one of the lowest in the European Union.

Year	2000	2001	2002	2003	2004	2005	2006	2007	2008	2009	2010	2011	2012	2013	2014	2015	2016	2017
Unemployment rate in %	5.4	4.9	5.4	6.2	6.2	7.0	6.3	4.9	4.1	5.1	4.9	4.0	3.9	4.1	4.0	3.8	3.8	3.5

=== Tourism ===
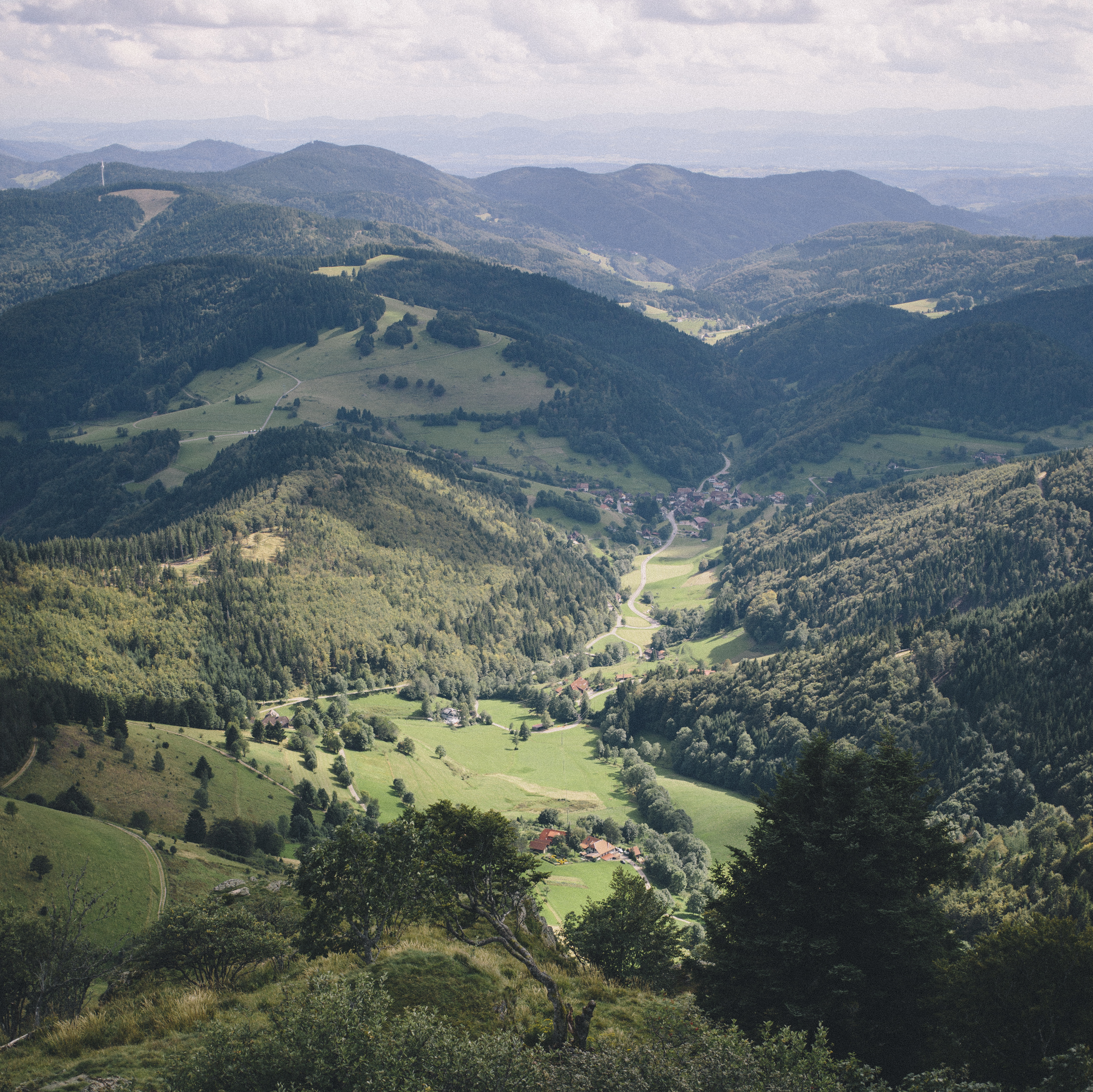
The Black Forest as seen from the Belchen

Baden-Württemberg is a popular holiday destination, ranking second among the German states by the total number of visitors' overnight stays behind Bavaria. Main sights include the capital and biggest city, Stuttgart, modern and historical at the same time, with its urban architecture and atmosphere (and famously, its inner-city parks and historic Wilhelma zoo), its castles (such as Castle Solitude), its museums as well as a rich cultural programme (theatre, opera) and mineral spring baths in Bad Cannstatt (also the site of a Roman Castra); it is the only major city in Germany with vineyards in an urban territory.

The residential (court) towns of Ludwigsburg and Karlsruhe, the spas and casino of Baden-Baden, the medieval architecture of Ulm (Ulm Münster is the tallest church in the world), the traditional university towns of Heidelberg and Tübingen with the castles looking out above the river Neckar, are popular smaller towns. Baden-Württemberg also contains old Free Imperial Cities such as Biberach, Esslingen am Neckar, Heilbronn, Ravensburg, Reutlingen, Künzelsau, Schwäbisch Hall and Aalen as well as the southernmost and sunniest city of Germany, Freiburg, close to Alsace and Switzerland, being a base for exploring the Black Forest (e.g., for skiing in winter or for hiking in summer) with its villages and the surrounding wine country of the Rhine Valley of South Baden.

The countryside of the Upper Neckar valley (where Rottweil is famous for its Fastnacht carnival) and the pristine Danube valley Swabian Alb (with Hohenzollern Castle and Sigmaringen Castle), as well as the largely pristine Swabian Forest, the Upper Rhine Valley, and Lake Constance, where all kinds of water sports are popular, with the former Imperial, today border town of Konstanz (where the Council of Constance took place), the Neolithic and Bronze Age village at Unteruhldingen, the flower island of Mainau, and the hometown of the Zeppelin, Friedrichshafen a.o., are especially popular for outdoor activities in the summer months.

In spring and autumn (April/May and September/October), beer festivals (fun fairs) take place at the Cannstatter Wasen in Stuttgart. The Cannstatter Volksfest, in the autumn, is the second-largest such festival in the world after the Munich Oktoberfest. In late November and early December Christmas markets are a tourist magnet in all major towns, the largest being in Stuttgart during the three weeks before Christmas.

The Bertha Benz Memorial Route is a 194 km signposted scenic route from Mannheim via Heidelberg and Wiesloch to Pforzheim and back, which follows the route of the world's first long-distance journey by automobile which Bertha Benz undertook in August 1888.

Baden-Württemberg also is home to Europa-Park in Rust. The largest theme park in Germany, and the second most popular theme park in Europe, after Disneyland Paris.

=== Companies owned by Baden-Württemberg ===
Company	Industry	Percentage owned	Ref.
EnBW	Energy industry	45%	
Badische Staatsbrauerei Rothaus	Beverage industry	100%	

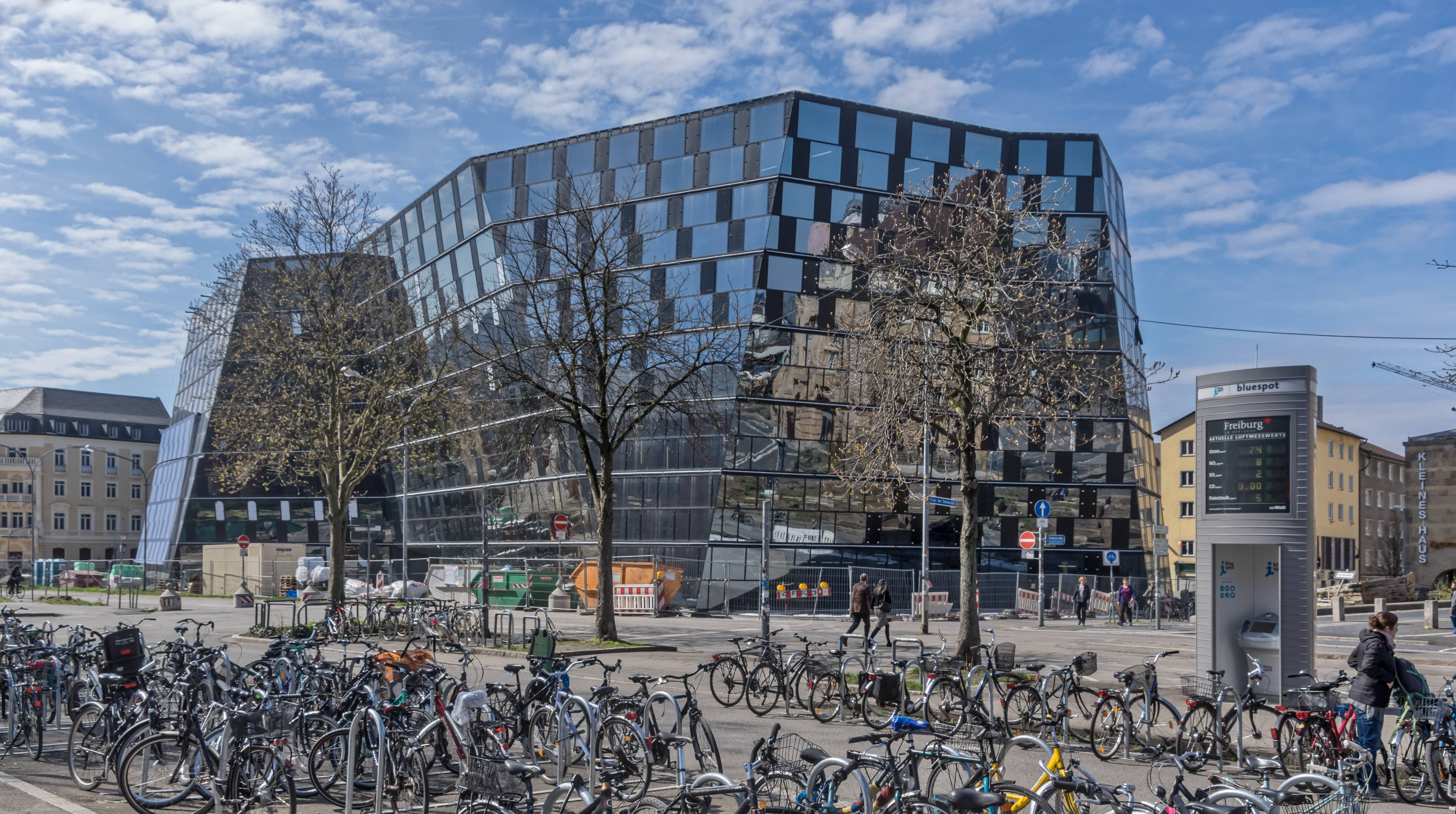
The University Library Freiburg was reopened in 2015.

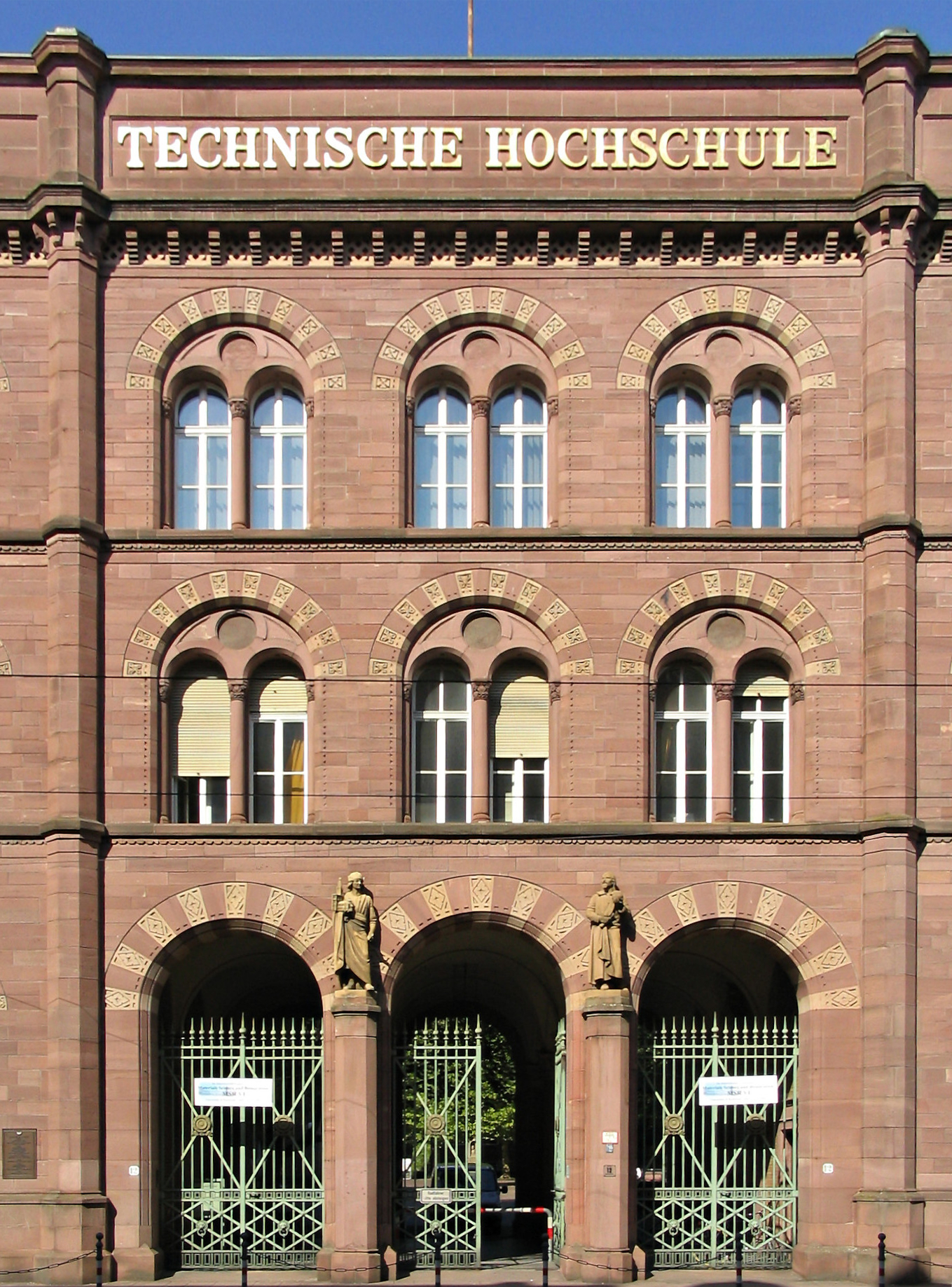
The University of Karlsruhe. Since 2009, it has been known as the Karlsruhe Institute of Technology.

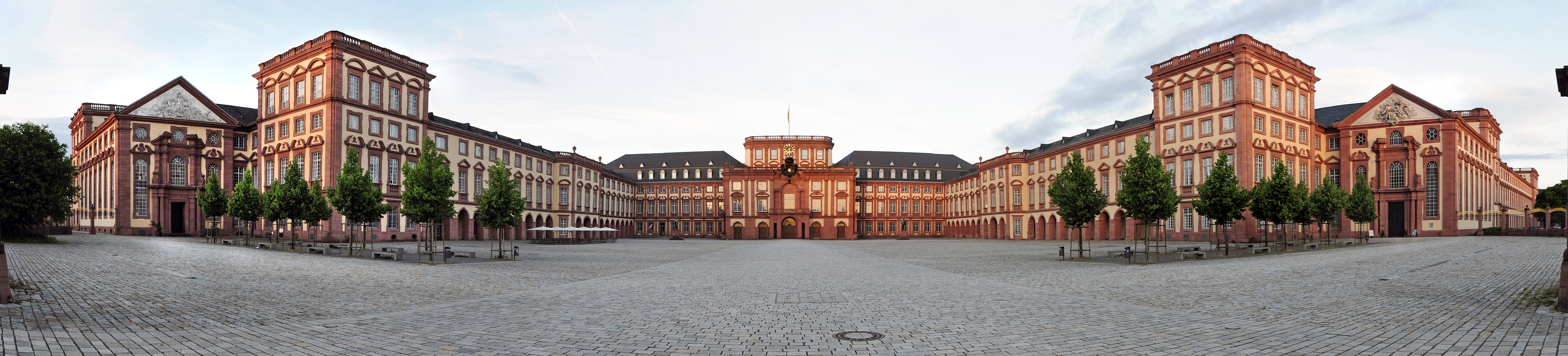
The Mannheim Palace houses the University of Mannheim, which repeatedly receives top marks in business administration and is sometimes referred to as the "Harvard of Germany".

== Education ==
Baden-Württemberg is home to some of the oldest, most renowned, and prestigious universities in Germany, such as the universities of Heidelberg (founded in 1386, the oldest university within the territory of modern Germany), Freiburg (founded in 1457), and Tübingen (founded in 1477). It also contains three of the eleven German excellence universities (Heidelberg, Tübingen, Konstanz and Karlsruhe and formerly, Freiburg ).

Other university towns are Mannheim and Ulm. Furthermore, two universities are located in the state capital Stuttgart, the University of Hohenheim, and the University of Stuttgart. Ludwigsburg is home to the national film school Filmakademie Baden-Württemberg (Film Academy Baden-Wuerttemberg). The private International University in Germany was situated in Bruchsal, but closed in 2009. Another private university is located in Friedrichshafen, Zeppelin University.

Furthermore, there are more than a dozen Fachhochschulen, i.e., universities of applied sciences, as well as Pädagogische Hochschulen, i.e., teacher training colleges, and other institutions of tertiary education in Baden-Württemberg. (Note: Among others in Aalen, Biberach an der Riss, Esslingen, Karlsruhe, Ludwigsburg, Nürtingen, Pforzheim, Ravensburg-Weingarten, Reutlingen, several in Stuttgart, Schwäbisch Hall) Pforzheim University is one of the oldest Fachhochschulen in Germany which is renowned and highly ranked for its engineering and MBA programs.

The state has the highest density of universities of any state in Germany.

== Transport ==
=== Railway ===
Map of rail transport infrastructures in Baden-Württemberg

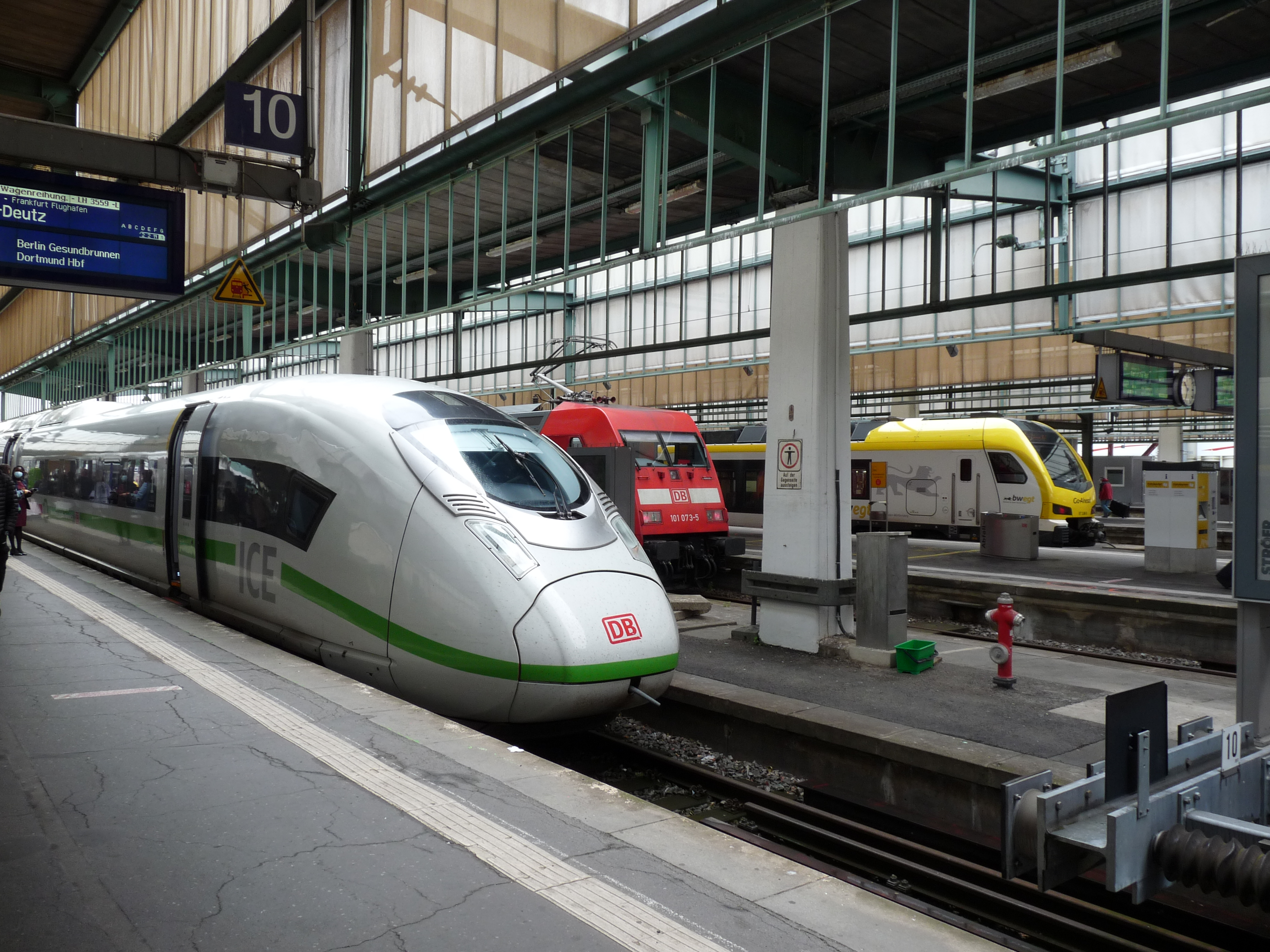
ICE high-speed, Intercity and Go-Ahead regional train in Stuttgart's central station

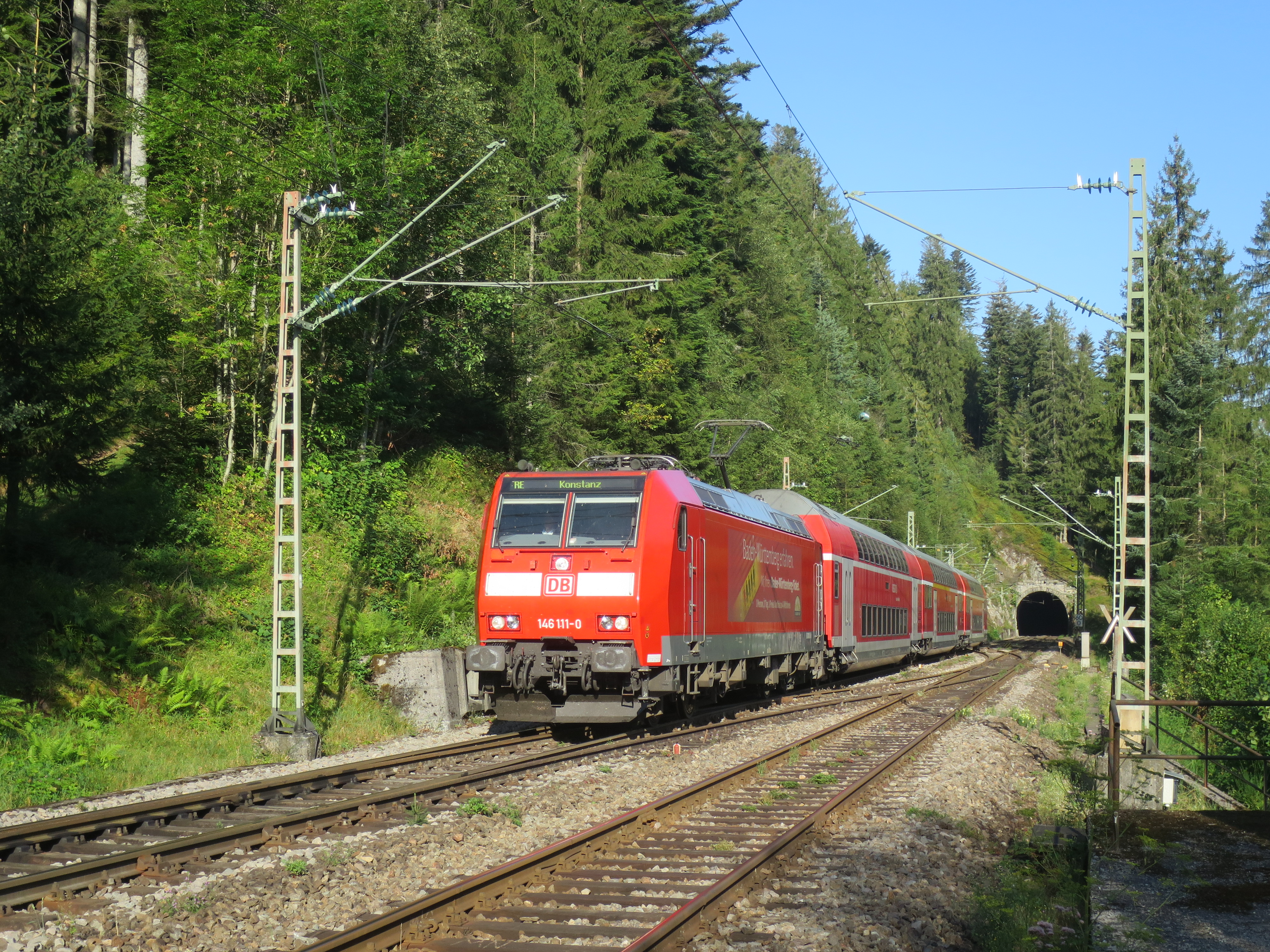
DB Regio regional train on the Black Forest Railway

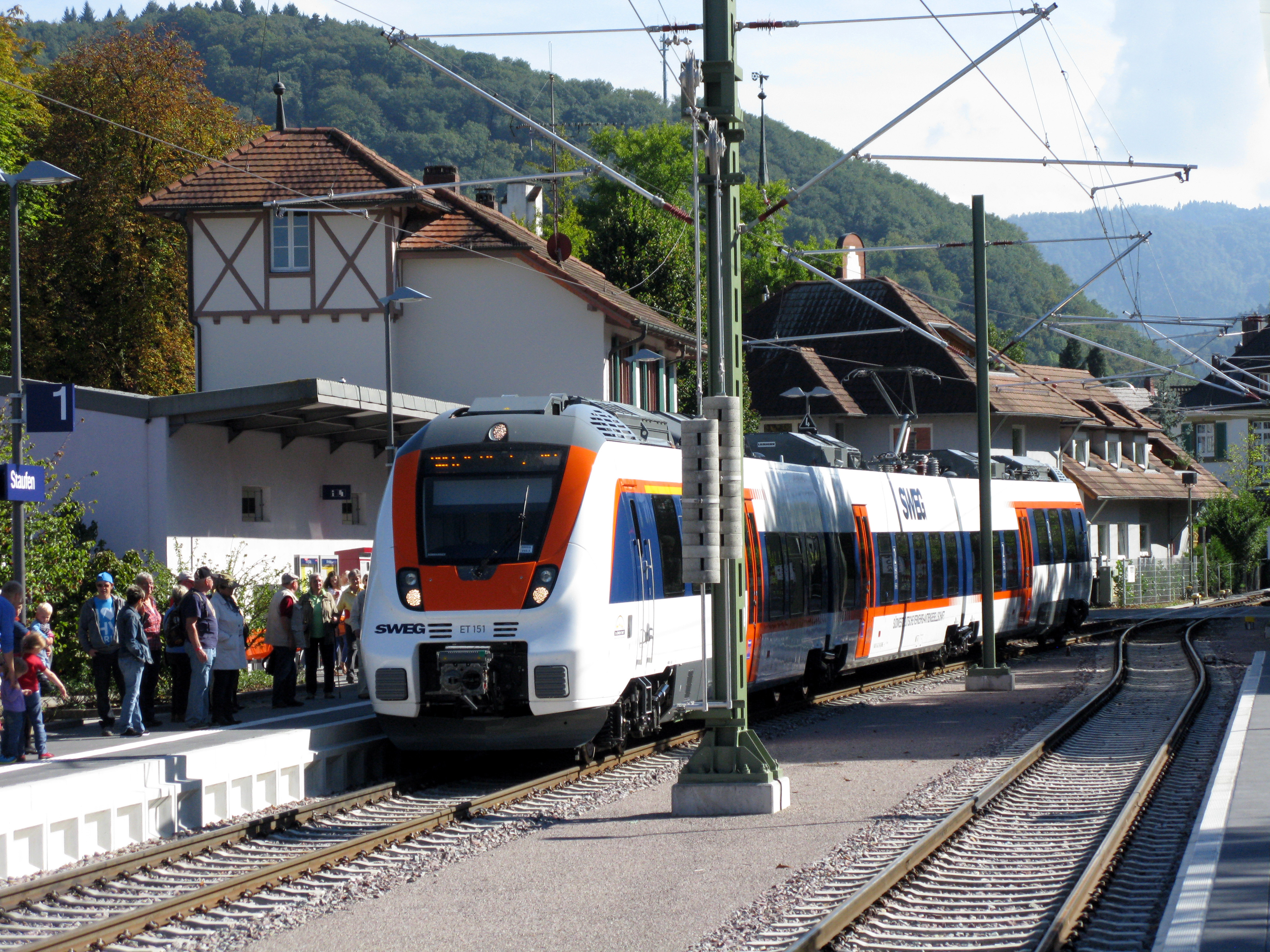
SWEG local train on the Münstertal branch line

Railways form a major part of the transport infrastructure in Baden-Württemberg. As of 2017, the main standard gauge railway network managed by DB InfraGO consists of about 3,350 kilometres (2,080 mi) of railway lines connecting all major settlements of the state, with about 6,500 trains operating every day. As part of high-speed rail in Germany, the Mannheim–Stuttgart and Stuttgart–Ulm high-speed lines were built, and the Karlsruhe–Basel high-speed line, paralleling the traditional Mannheim–Karlsruhe–Basel railway, is currently under construction. In and around Stuttgart, the old terminal station is currently being replaced with an underground through station as part of the controversial Stuttgart 21 project.

Local branch lines of around 860 kilometres (530 mi), managed by the state-owned SWEG and Hohenzollerische Landesbahn (HzL), Karlsruhe-owned Albtal-Verkehrs-Gesellschaft (AVG), private Württembergische Eisenbahn (WEG) and other smaller rail infrastructure operators, complete the state's railway infrastructure.

Passenger train services in Baden-Württemberg are operated partly by various subsidiaries of Deutsche Bahn, the national railway operator, such as DB Fernverkehr with its high-speed ICE, as well as IC trains; and DB Regio, operating some regional train services in the state. Cross-border train services are also provided by French Railways' TGV trains, as well as by Swiss Federal Railways and Austrian Federal Railways (including its Nightjet night trains).

Since the 1990s, the around 120 individual regional train services in Baden-Württemberg have been managed by the state-owned Nahverkehrsgesellschaft Baden-Württemberg (NVBW), (Note: With some exceptions, such as the Stuttgart S-Bahn, which is managed by the Verband Region Stuttgart; services on a few minor lines managed by the local Landkreise; and formerly also services running without any state subsidies.) which has started to commercially tender out these train operations. DB Regio, SWEG, HzL, AVG and WEG have been joined in operating regional trains by Agilis, Bodensee-Oberschwaben-Bahn, Arverio, SBB, Schwäbische Alb-Bahn and VIAS, which entered the market.

Starting in the 1970s, regional rail around major cities has been transformed into high-frequent S-Bahn networks, currently the following systems exist (partly) in Baden-Württemberg: Stuttgart S-Bahn, Rhine-Neckar S-Bahn, Breisgau S-Bahn and Basel S-Bahn. In and around the cities of Karlsruhe and Heilbronn, the Karlsruhe Stadtbahn system combines elements of traditional S-Bahns with tram operations within the urban cores (tram-trains).

Historically, the railway system in Baden-Württemberg was developed at first by the state's predecessors' state railways: the Grand Duchy of Baden State Railway opened its first railway line between Mannheim and Heidelberg on 12 September 1840; uniquely in Germany, it used a broad gauge of 1,600 mm (5 ft 3 in) in its early years. In Württemberg, the Royal State Railways opened their first line on 22 October 1845 between two present-day suburbs of Stuttgart. In 1900, the Hohenzollerische Landesbahn (HzL) was founded to expand the rail system in the Prussian province, which had previously only been served by short sections of Württemberg lines passing through "foreign" territory. After the construction of the main lines, various private or local government initiatives constructed branch or local railway lines, some of which survive today as AVG, SWEG, RNV or WEG lines. In 1920, the Baden and Württemberg state railways merged with other state railways to form Deutsche Reichsbahn, which was replaced by Deutsche Bundesbahn after World War II. A lot of smaller railway lines, both DB and remaining local or private lines, closed in the decades after World War II, or were at least run-down with minimal service for passengers. Since the 1990s, some of these lines have been revived and revitalised marking good examples for increased ridership through attractive trains and timetables, with some examples being the Kraichgau Railway (taken over by AVG) and the Schönbuch Railway (reopened by WEG).

A popular TV programme portraying railways around Germany and the world, Eisenbahn-Romantik, originates in Baden-Württemberg and is produced by its public broadcaster SWR.

=== Urban public transport ===
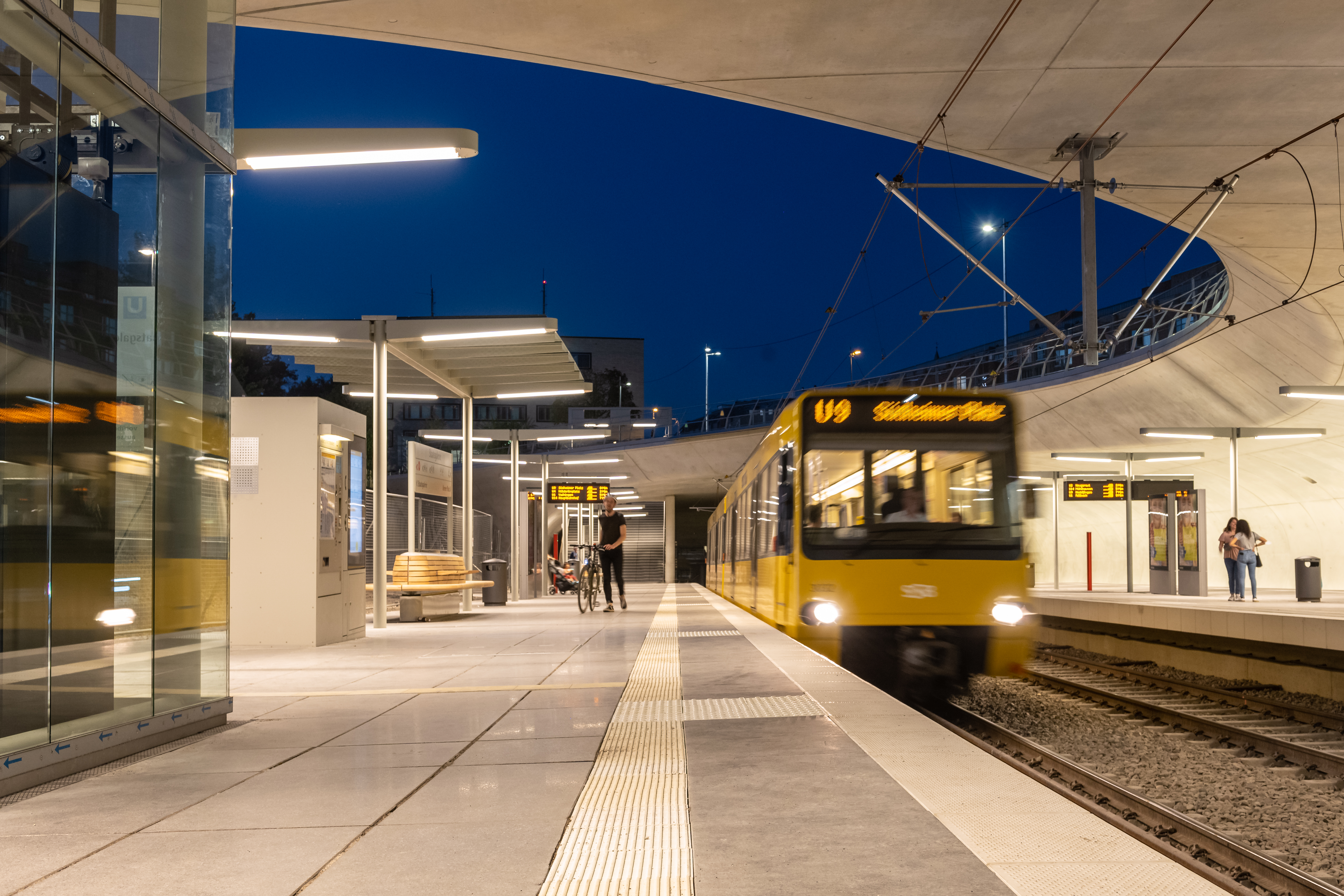
Underground open-air light rail station in Stuttgart

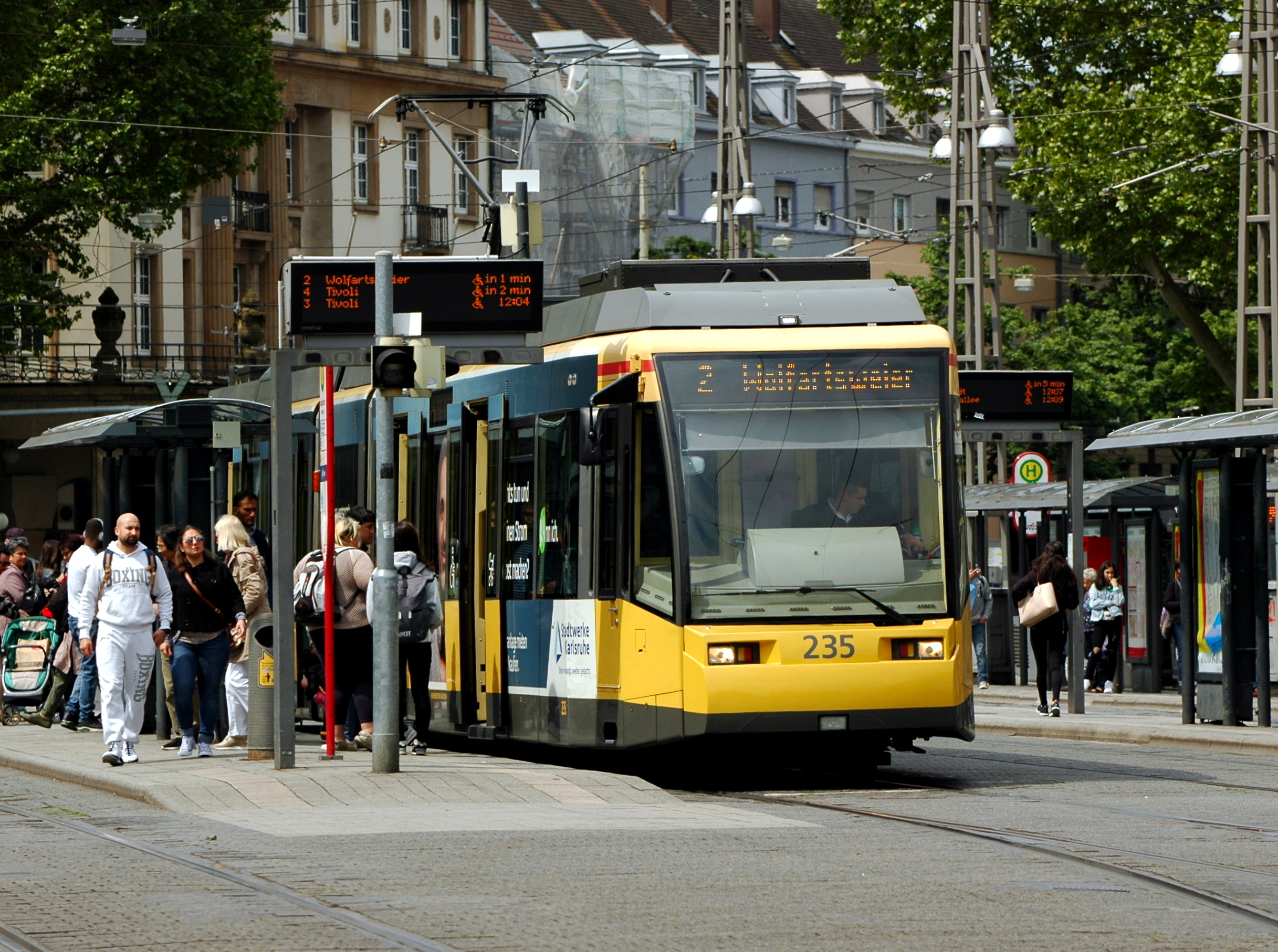
Tram in front of Karlsruhe's central station

Baden-Württemberg's area is covered by 19 Verkehrsverbünde (transport associations), organising and managing local public transport, as well as ensuring harmonised fares between different bus and train operators. For inter-Verbünde journeys, the bwtarif, created in 2018, offers seamless tickets across the state.

As of 2023, tram and light rail systems exist in Freiburg, Heidelberg, (Note: Connected to the Mannheim/Ludwigshafen system, and to Viernheim (Hesse) by metre-gauge interurbans) Heilbronn, (Note: Part of the Karlsruhe Stadtbahn system, with which through-running tram-trains exist) Karlsruhe, (Note: Through-running tram-trains (Karlsruhe Stadtbahn) connect the Karlsruhe tram system with insular tram lines in Bad Wildbad, Heilbronn, Linkenheim-Hochstetten and Wörth am Rhein (Rhineland-Palatinate).) Mannheim, (Note: Cross-border network with Ludwigshafen in Rhineland-Palatinate. Connected to the Heidelberg system, and to Bad Dürkheim (Rhineland-Palatinate) and Viernheim (Hesse) by metre-gauge interurbans.) Stuttgart and Ulm. International tram lines also reach Baden-Württemberg: Basel's tram 8 serves Weil am Rhein, while Strasbourg's tram D extends to Kehl. There is also a trolleybus system in Esslingen am Neckar.

=== Airports ===
Baden-Württemberg is served by several airports. The largest is Stuttgart Airport, which functions as the state’s main international hub. Other commercial airports include Karlsruhe/Baden-Baden Airport and Friedrichshafen Airport. The EuroAirport Basel Mulhouse Freiburg, located on the French–German–Swiss border, Frankfurt Airport and Zurich Airport are also frequently used by passengers from the region.

== Demographics ==
Historical population
Year	Pop.	±% p.a.
1871	3,349,409	—
1900	4,107,325	+0.71%
1933	5,185,618	+0.71%
1950	6,430,225	+1.27%
1960	7,726,859	+1.85%
1970	8,895,048	+1.42%
1980	9,258,947	+0.40%
1990	9,822,027	+0.59%
2001	10,600,906	+0.70%
2011	10,486,660	−0.11%
2022	11,104,040	+0.52%

The population of Baden-Württemberg was 10,486,660 in 2014, of which 5,354,105 were female and 5,132,555 male. In 2006, the birth rate of 8.61 per 1000 was almost equal to the death rate of 8.60 per 1000. 14.87 percent of the population was under the age of 15, whereas the proportion of people aged 65 and older was at 18.99 per cent (2008). The dependency ratio–the ratio of people aged under 15 and over 64 in comparison to the working-age population (aged 15–64)–was 512 per 1000 (2008). In 2018, Baden-Württemberg ranked 2 on the Human Development Index (HDI) among all states in Germany, after Hamburg. With an average life expectancy of 79.8 years for men and 84.2 years for women (2017–2019 life table), Baden-Württemberg ranks first in this category among all states in Germany for both sexes.

Baden-Württemberg has long been a preferred destination of immigrants. As of 2013, almost 28% of its population had a migration background as defined by the Federal Statistical Office of Germany; this number clearly surpassed the German average of 21% and was higher than in any other German state with the exception of the city states of Hamburg and Bremen. As of 2014, 9,355,239 of the population held German citizenship, whereas 1,131,421 were foreign nationals.

Largest cities or towns in Baden-Württemberg www.statistik.baden-wuerttemberg.de
Rank		Regierungsbezirk	Pop.
1	Stuttgart	Stuttgart (region)	633,164
2	Karlsruhe	Karlsruhe (region)	311,484
3	Mannheim	Karlsruhe (region)	308,763
4	Freiburg im Breisgau	Freiburg (region)	229,341
5	Heidelberg	Karlsruhe (region)	160,196
6	Ulm	Tübingen (region)	125,805
7	Heilbronn	Stuttgart (region)	125,599
8	Pforzheim	Karlsruhe (region)	125,108
9	Reutlingen	Tübingen (region)	115,877
10	Esslingen am Neckar	Stuttgart (region)	93,304

=== Vital statistics ===
- Births from January–March 2017 = ▲25,454
- Births from January–March 2018 = ▼25,161
- Deaths from January–March 2017 = ▲31,767
- Deaths from January–March 2018 = ▼31,725
- Natural growth from January–March 2017 = ▲ -6,313
- Natural growth from January–March 2018 = ▼ -6,564

=== Religion ===
Religion in Baden-Württemberg – 2025
Religion	Percent
None or other	49.6%
Roman Catholics	27.1%
EKD Protestants	23.3%

In 2025, 49.6% of the population was not religious or adhered to religions other than the Evangelical Church or Catholicism. 27.1% of the population belonged to the Roman Catholic Church, the largest religious body, and 23.3% to the Evangelical Church (EKD).

In 2011, 6% of the population adhered to Islam.

Northern and most of central Württemberg has been traditionally Protestant (particularly Lutheran) since the Reformation in 1534 (with its centre at the famous Tübinger Stift). The former Electorate of the Palatinate (Northwestern Baden) with its capital Heidelberg was shaped by Calvinism before being integrated into Baden. Upper Swabia, and the Upper Neckar Valley up to the bishop seat of Rottenburg, and Southern Baden (the Catholic archbishop has its seat in Freiburg) have traditionally been bastions of Roman Catholicism.

=== Sports ===
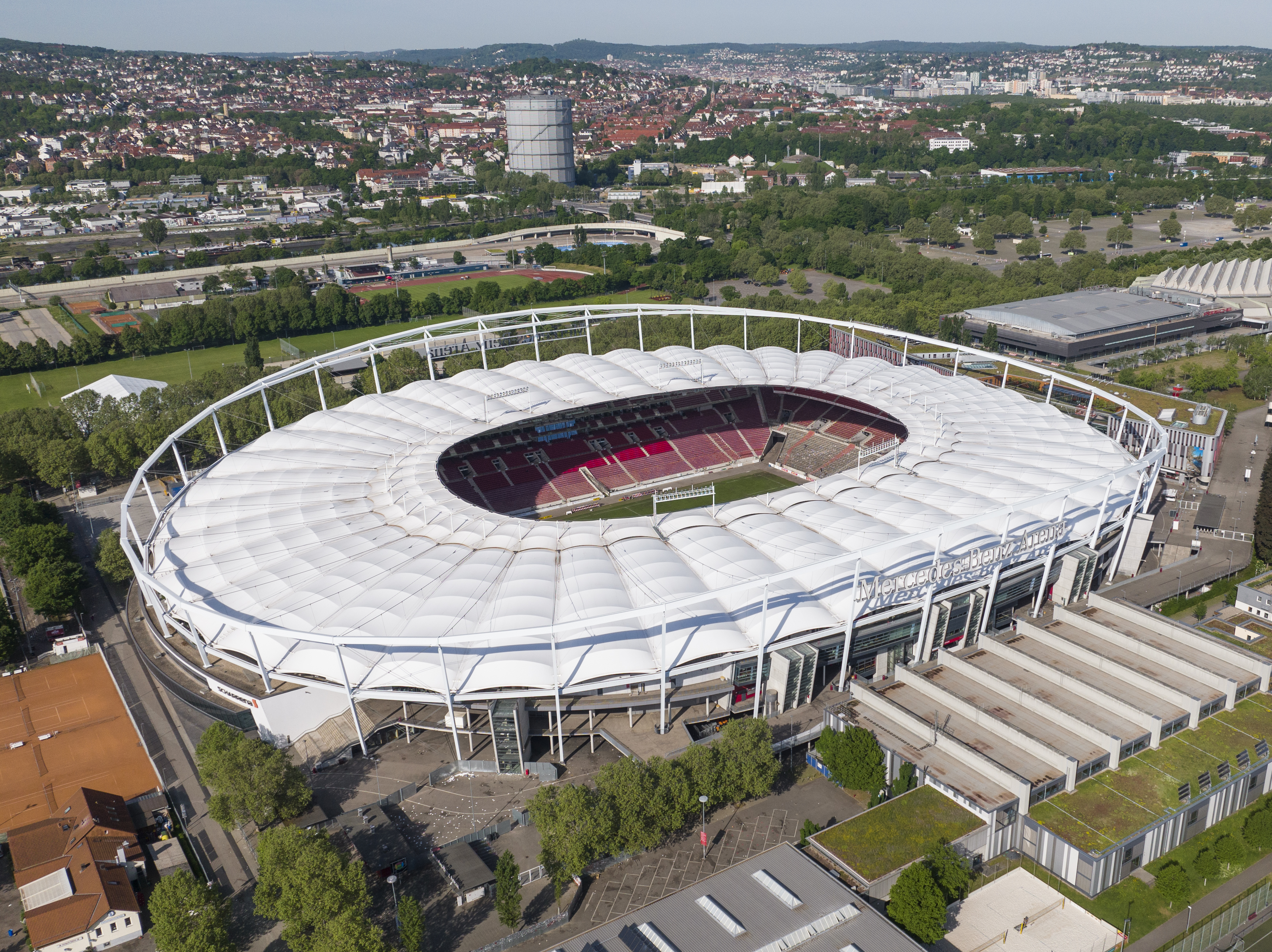
MHPArena in Stuttgart, one of the largest stadiums in Germany

==== Football ====
Football is the biggest sport in Baden-Württemberg. Clubs currently competing in the Bundesliga include SC Freiburg, TSG 1899 Hoffenheim and the most successful club in the state, VfB Stuttgart, meanwhile Karlsruher SC, 1. FC Heidenheim, SV Sandhausen and Waldhof Mannheim also compete in the top three German soccer divisions.

==== Handball ====
Handball-Bundesliga multiple champions Frisch Auf Göppingen and Rhein-Neckar Löwen, as well as TVB 1898 Stuttgart are based in Baden-Württemberg. Frisch Auf Göppingen won EHF Champions League (Europe's premier club tournament) twice, in 1960 and 1962. Several major women's handball clubs are also based here, including 3-time Frauen Bundesliga champions SG BBM Bietigheim.

==== Basketball ====
Compared to other German states, Baden-Württemberg has a particularly high density of professional basketball teams such as Riesen Ludwigsburg, ratiopharm Ulm, USC Heidelberg, PS Karlsruhe Lions and others.

==== Ice hockey ====
One of the most decorated German ice hockey clubs, Adler Mannheim, is based in the city of Mannheim. Other DEL clubs, such as Bietigheim Steelers and Schwenninger Wild Wings are also based in the state.

==== Volleyball ====
Baden-Württemberg is home to the most successful club in German volleyball history, the Volleyball-Bundesliga club VfB Friedrichshafen, which won CEV Champions League in 2006–07 season.

==== Motorsport ====
There are also multiple motorsport facilities, the most famous one being long-time Formula One circuit Hockenheimring.

=== Dialects ===
Alemannic and Franconian dialects of German are spoken in Baden-Württemberg. Slightly different variants of the Alemannic dialect Swabian are spoken in central and southern Württemberg, including in Upper Swabia, the Swabian Alb, and the central Neckar Valley of the Stuttgart region. In South Baden, the local dialects are Low Alemannic and High Alemannic (i.e., variants of what is also Swiss German). In the northern part of Baden, i.e., the area around Karlsruhe, Heilbronn and Mosbach, South Franconian dialects are predominant. In the Kurpfalz, however, with the cities of Heidelberg and Mannheim, the idiom is Rhine Franconian (i.e., Palatinate German), while in the Northeast of Baden-Württemberg East Franconian is spoken.

The same or similar Alemannic dialects are also spoken in the neighboring regions, especially in Bavarian Swabia, Alsace (Alsatian), German-speaking Switzerland (Swiss German), and the Austrian Vorarlberg. In contrast, the other Franconian dialects range from the Netherlands over the Rhineland, Lorraine, and Hesse up to Franconia in northern Bavaria.

Yiddish and Pleißne were spoken while Romani is still being used by some.

A variant of the Alemannic German of Baden developed into the Colonia Tovar dialect, spoken by descendants of immigrants from Baden who went to Venezuela in 1843.

=== Foreigners ===
As of 20 April 2022, the largest groups of foreign residents by country of origin were:

Significant foreign resident populations
Nationality	Population (20 April 2022)	Population (31 December 2023)
Turkey	255,675	267,940
Romania	164,600	182,690
Italy	183,920	178,595
Ukraine	150,105	166,925
Croatia	128,170	124,920
Syria	87,365	97,875
Poland	90,855	84,160
Kosovo	77,130	83,925
Greece	82,370	78,960
Hungary	59,205	54,190

== See also ==
- List of minister-presidents of Baden-Württemberg
- Käpfle
- List of places in Baden-Württemberg
- Four Motors for Europe
- History of Baden-Württemberg
- Türnleberg
- Württemberg
  - Coat of arms of Württemberg
  - County of Württemberg
  - Duchy of Württemberg
  - Electorate of Württemberg
  - Kingdom of Württemberg
- Baden
  - Coat of arms of Baden
  - Margraviate of Baden, for the 16th–18th century state
  - Electorate of Baden, for the Napoleonic state
  - Grand Duchy of Baden, for the state that existed from 1808–1918
  - Republic of Baden, for the state that existed from 1918–1945
  - Rulers of Baden, for a list of sovereigns and presidents
