= Käpfle =

Mountain in Baden-Württemberg, Germany

Coordinates: 48°28′N 9°09′E

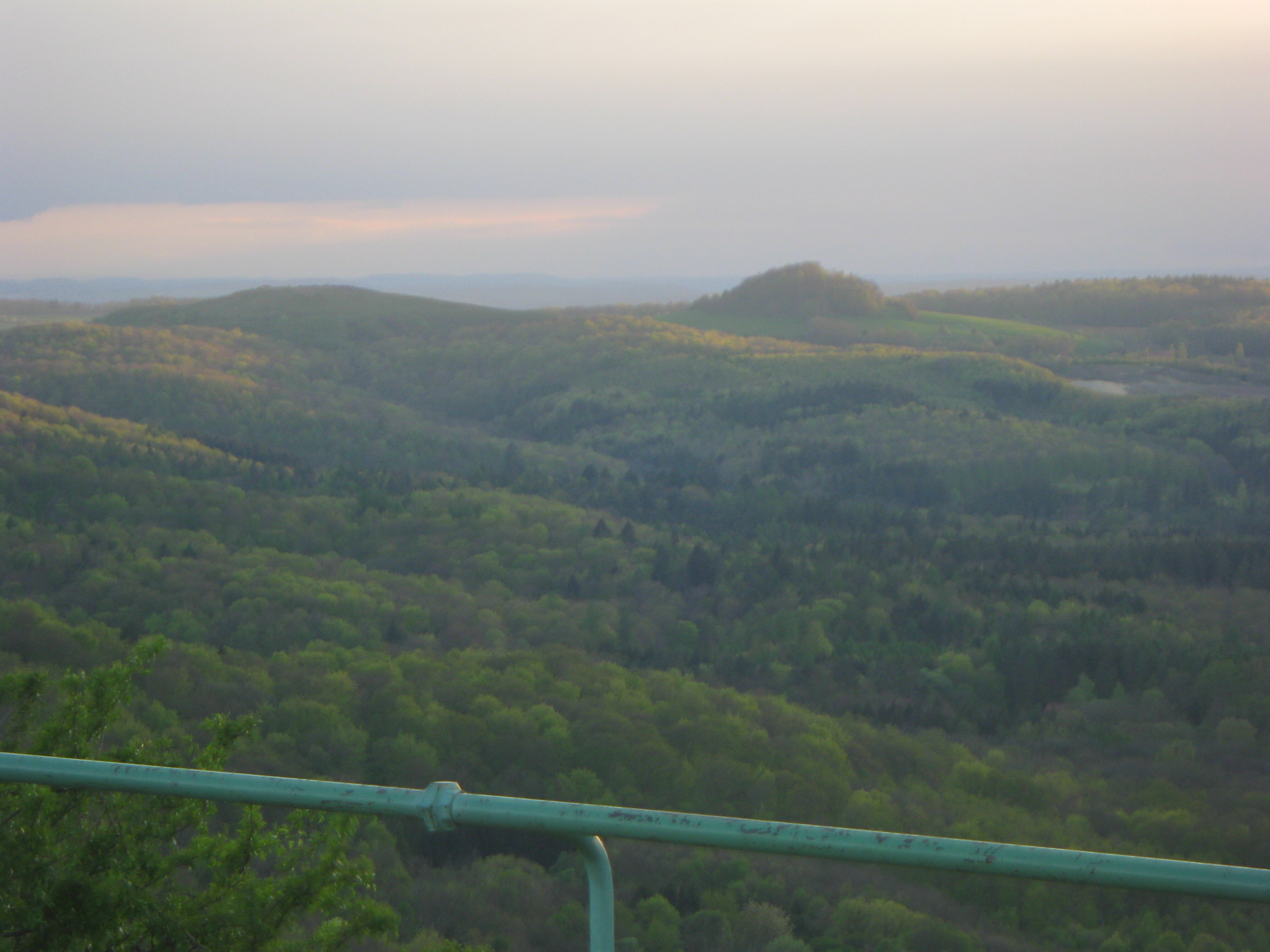
- Käpfle' view

Highest point
- Elevation: 593 m (1,946 ft)

Geography
- Location: Baden-Württemberg, Germany

Käpfle is a mountain of Baden-Württemberg, Germany to the north of Reutlingen.

On the summit there is a 12m high observation tower, first built in 1974, offering panoramic views of the surrounding area.

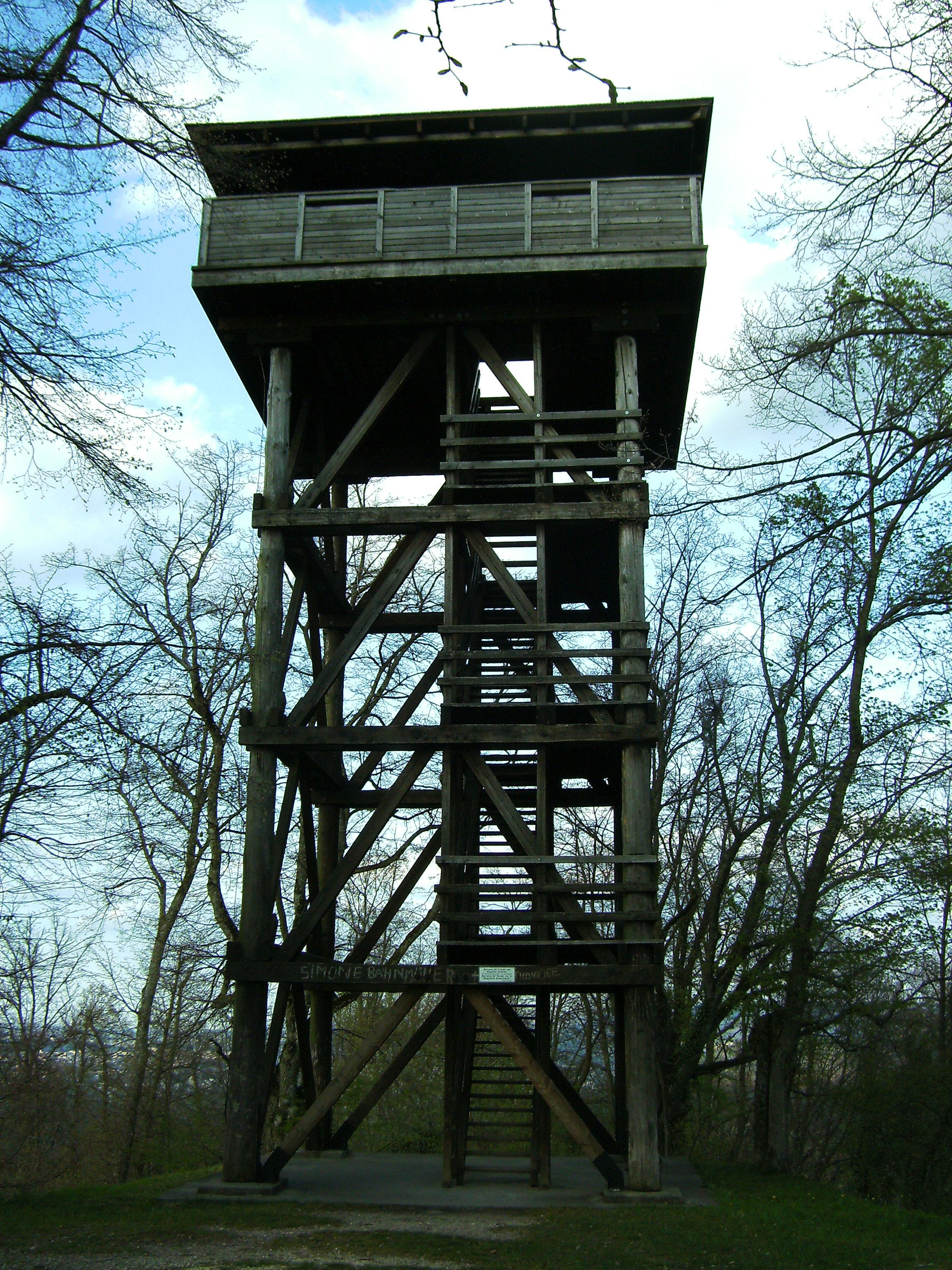
Summit observation tower
