= Haigern =

Coordinates: 49°05′42″N 9°12′06″E

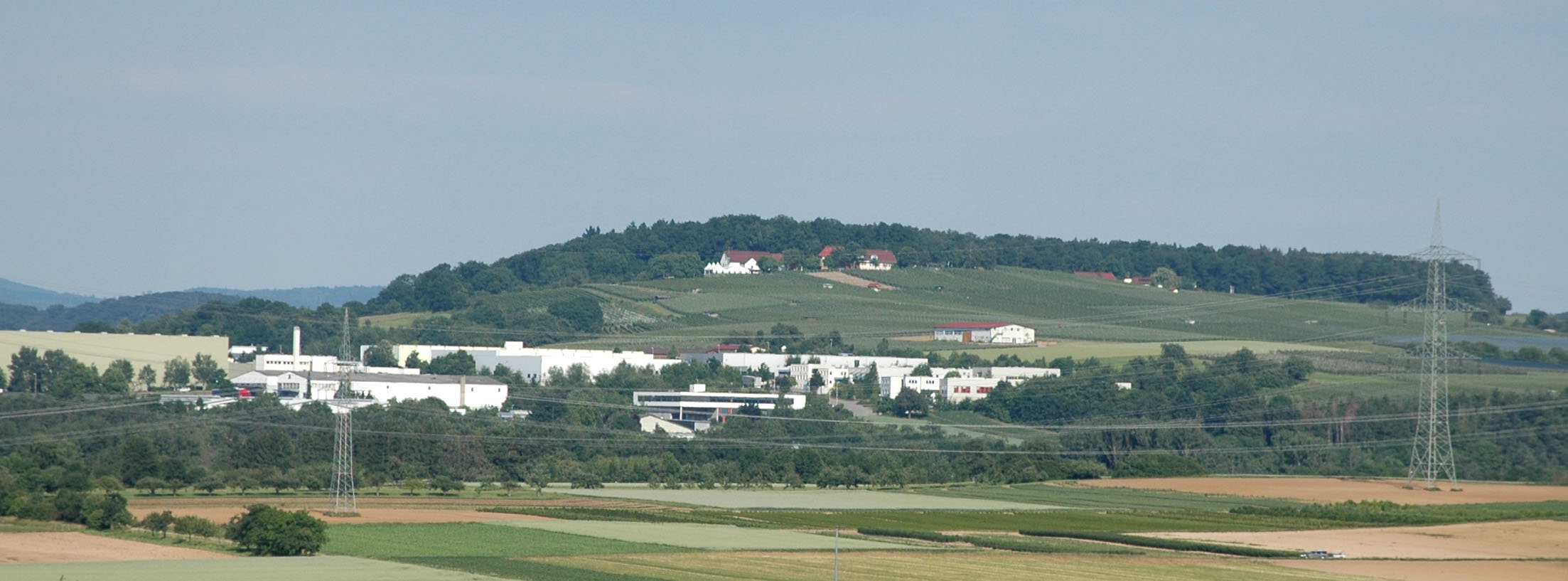
- View of the Haigern mountain from Nordheim

Highest point
- Elevation: 285 m (935 ft)

Geography
- Location: Baden-Württemberg, Germany

Haigern is a mountain of Baden-Württemberg, Germany.
