= Augstberg =

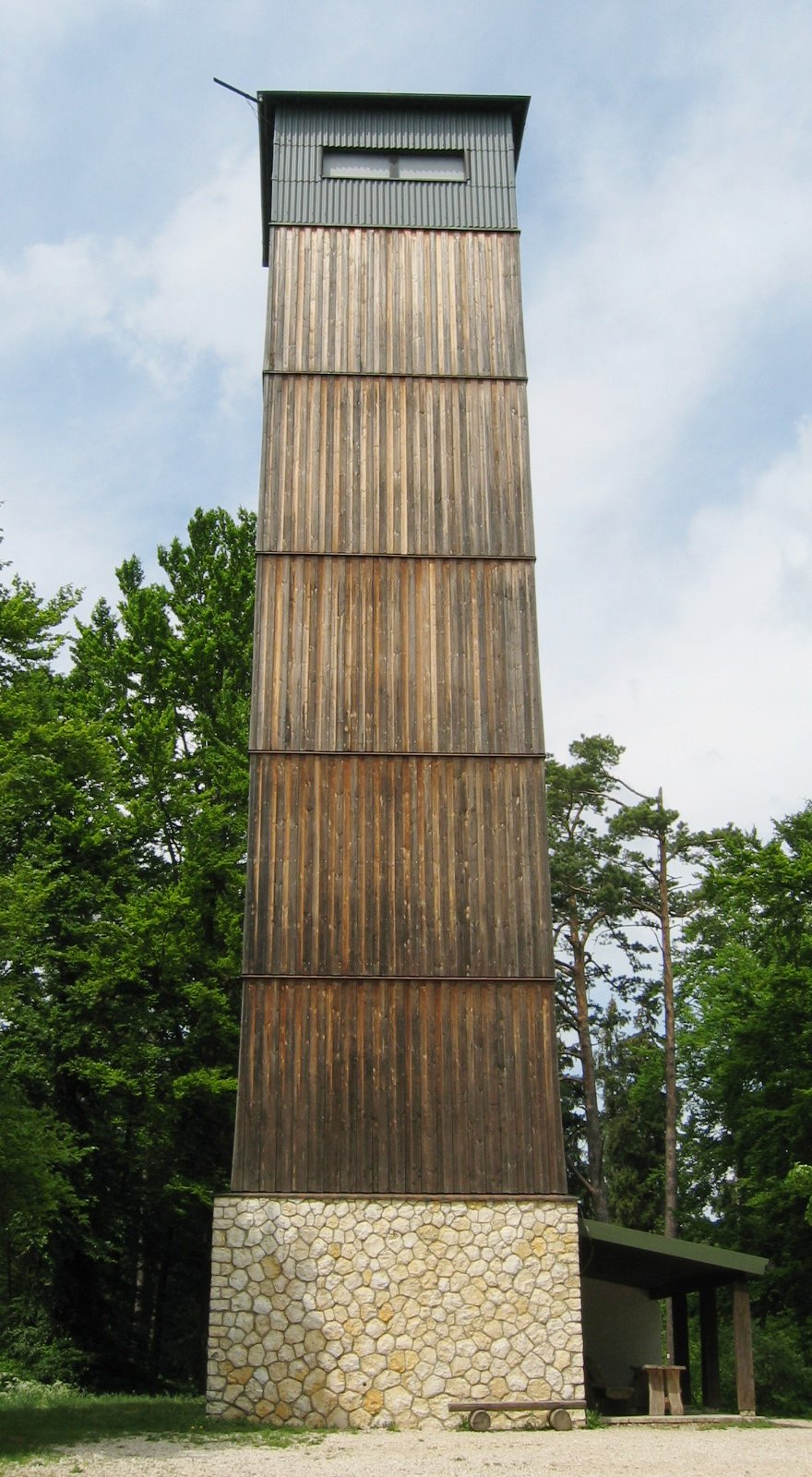

Highest point
- Elevation: 848.1 m (2,782 ft)
- Coordinates: 48°18′N 09°17′E

Geography
- Location within Baden-Württemberg
- Location: Baden-Württemberg, Germany

Augstberg (848 m) is a mountain on the Swabian Jura in Baden-Württemberg, Germany. It can be found 1.5 km south of Steinhilben, a district to the east of the town Trochtelfingen.

== History ==
In 1894, a 15 m high wooden observation tower (Augstbergturm) was constructed at the summit. Four years later in 1898, a storm brought the tower down. After reconstruction, the tower was raised to be 22 m high.

In 1910, for the last time, the tower was hit by a storm, causing the structure to collapse. In 1963 the tower was inaugurated, and rebuilt with reinforced concrete, now bringing the tower to 30 m high.

=== Etymology ===
Augstberg comes from Old High German ouwist meaning "sheep herd."
