= Türnleberg =

Mountain in Baden-Württemberg, Germany

Coordinates: 48°02′53″N 8°33′41″E

Highest point
- Elevation: 793 m (2,602 ft)

Geography
- Location: Baden-Württemberg, Germany

Türnleberg is a mountain of Baden-Württemberg, Germany.
