= Blasenberg (Swabian Jura) =

- Location within Baden-Württemberg

Highest point
- Elevation: 886 m (2,907 ft)
- Coordinates: 48°17′56″N 08°57′45″E

Geography
- Location: Zollernalbkreis, Baden-Württemberg, Germany

The Blasenberg is a mountain in Baden-Württemberg, Germany. It is located in the county of Zollernalbkreis.
