= Kammertenberg =

Mountain in Baden-Württemberg, Germany

Coordinates: 48°56′16″N 8°53′08″E

Highest point
- Elevation: 285.3 m (936 ft)

Geography
- Location: Baden-Württemberg, Germany

Kammertenberg is a mountain of Baden-Württemberg, Germany.
