= Geissberg (Germany) =

Coordinates: 48°50′36″N 8°51′05″E

Highest point
- Elevation: 509 m (1,670 ft)

Geography
- Location: Baden-Württemberg, Germany

Geissberg is a mountain of Baden-Württemberg, Germany.
