= Hardberg (Black Forest) =

Mountain of Baden-Württemberg, Germany

Coordinates: 48°47′07″N 8°13′58″E

Hardberg (Schwarzwald)
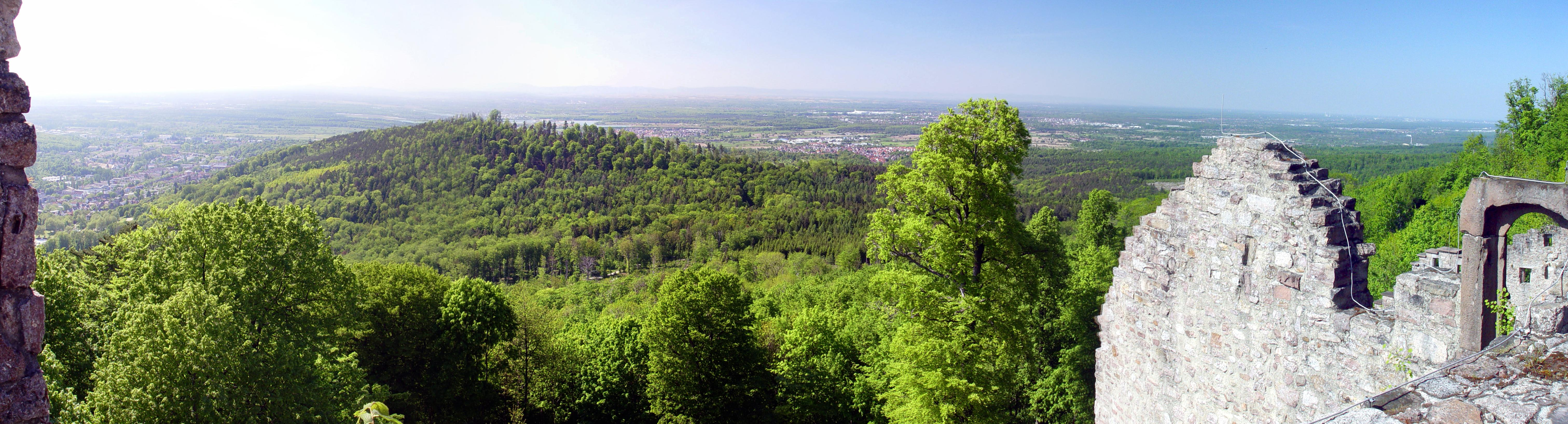
- Hardberg Mountain in Baden-Baden, Germany

Highest point
- Elevation: 374 m (1,227 ft)

Geography
- Location: Baden-Baden, Baden-Württemberg, Germany

Hardberg (Schwarzwald) is a mountain at the western edge of the Black Forest in Baden-Baden, Baden-Württemberg, Germany.
