= List of German scientists by century =

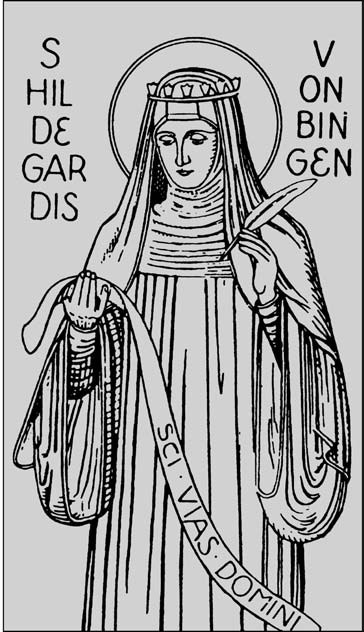
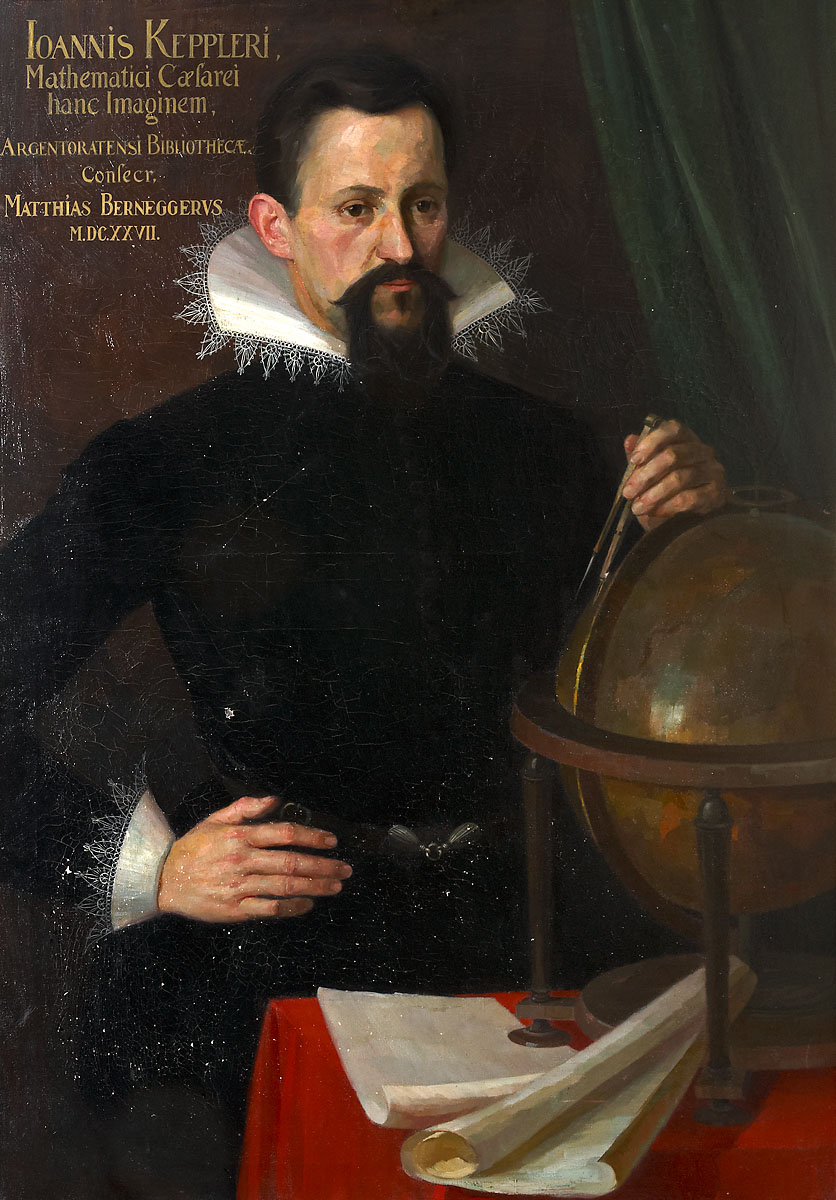
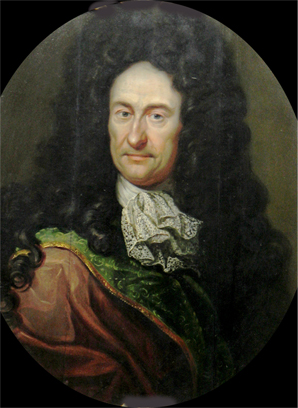
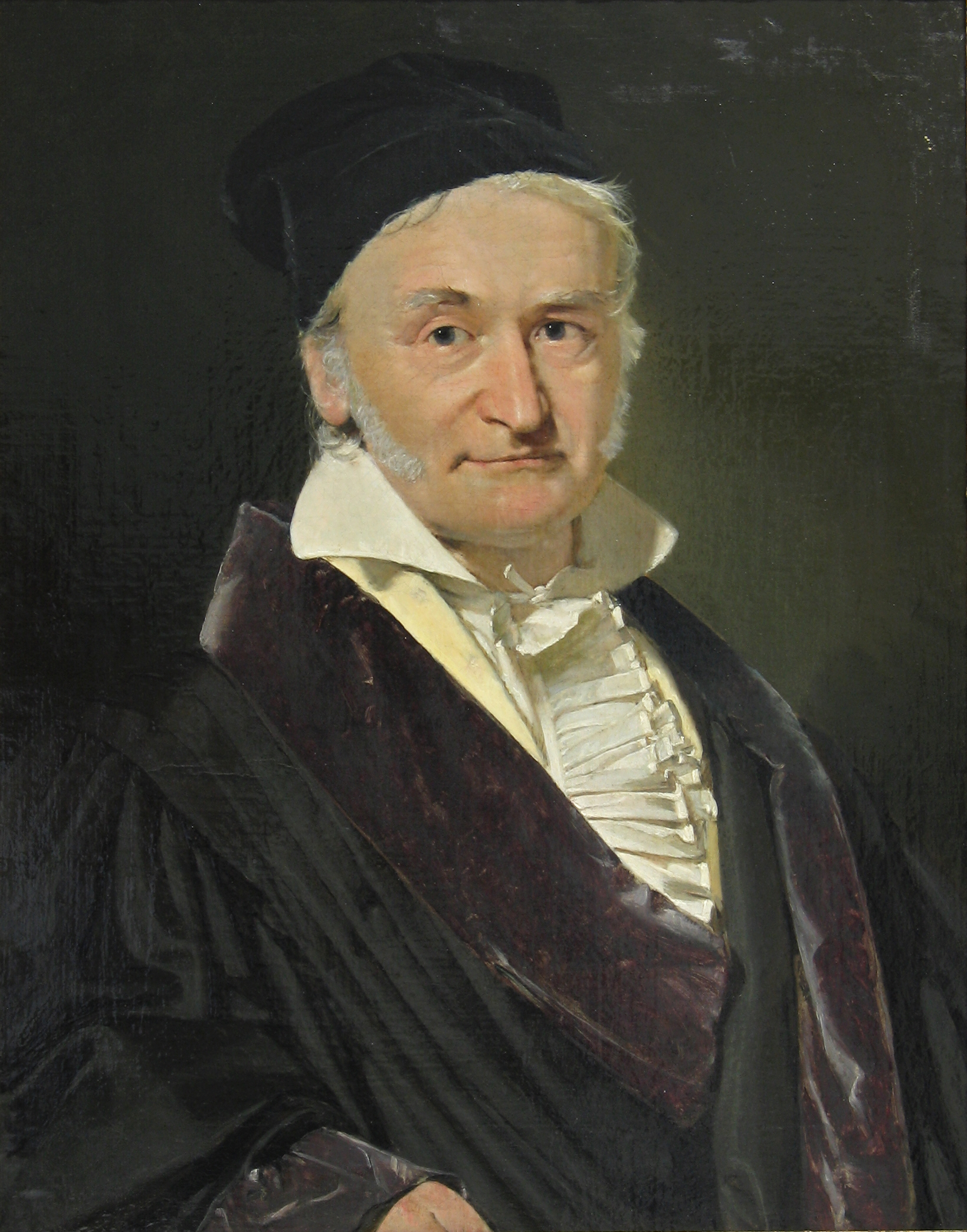
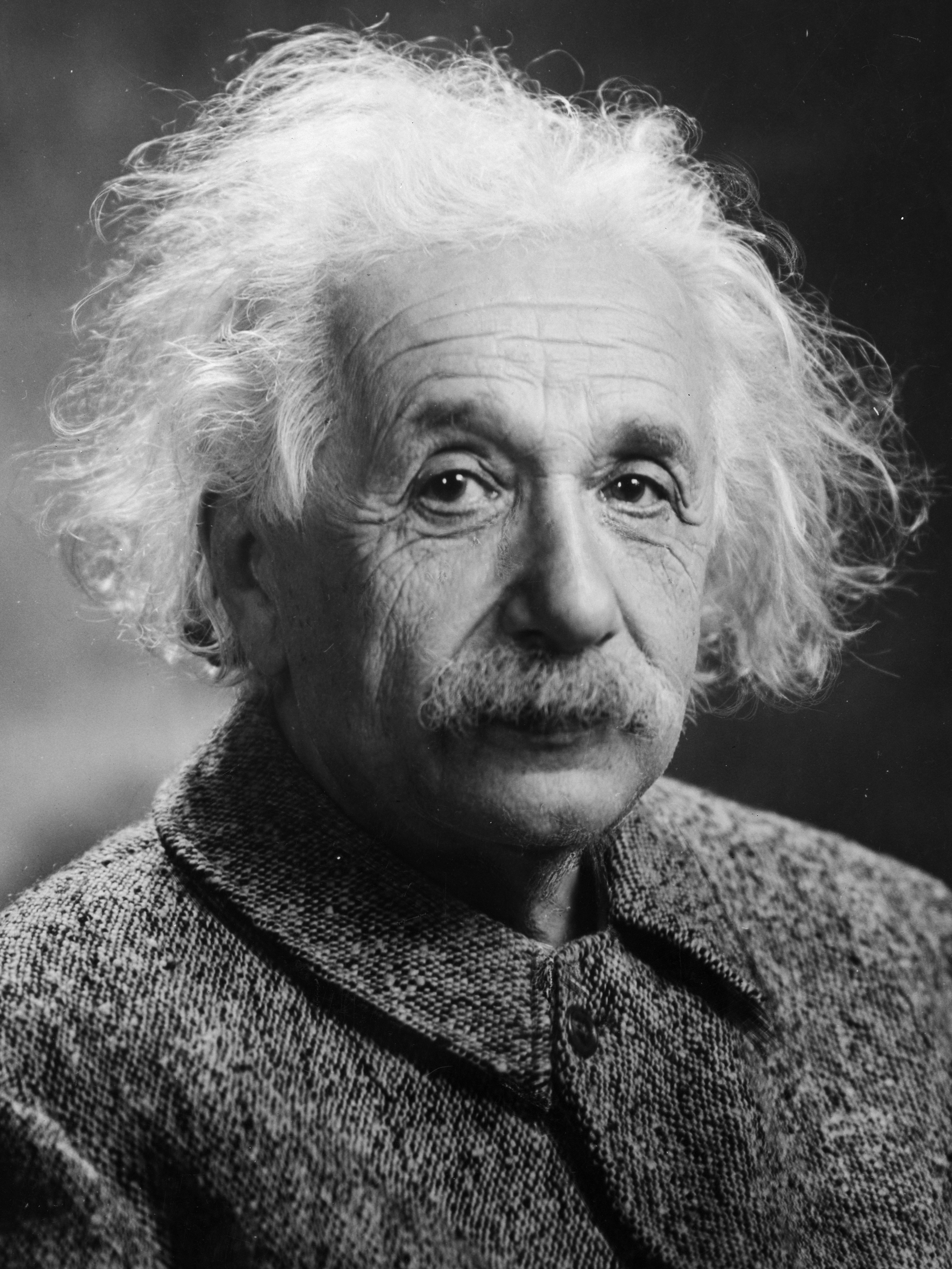
From top left, clockwise: Hildegard of Bingen, Johannes Kepler, Gottfried Wilhelm Leibniz, Albert Einstein, Carl Friedrich Gauss

This is a list of German scientists.

== Middle Ages ==
- Rabanus Maurus (780-856), writer
- Hildegard of Bingen (1098-1179), physician and theologian
- Albertus Magnus (c. 1200-1280), alchemist and chemist, classified minerals in a systematic way and discovered the element arsenic
- Theodoric of Freiberg (1250-1311), physicist and theologian
- Gottfried von Hagenau (1270-1325), physician
- John of Saxony, astronomer
- Albert of Saxony (1320-1390), mathematician, physicist and philosopher. He developed the theory of assumption
- Henry of Langenstein (1325-1397), He provided a revival of Eudoxus' cosmological model of concentric spheres
- Johannes Gutenberg (1396-1468), was a German inventor and craftsman who introduced letterpress printing to Europe with his movable-type printing press. Though movable type was already in use in East Asia, Gutenberg invented the printing press, which later spread across the world. His work led to an information revolution and the unprecedented mass-spread of literature throughout Europe. It also had a direct impact on the development of the Renaissance, Reformation, and humanist movements, as all of them have been described as "unthinkable" without Gutenberg's invention
- Johannes von Gmunden (1380-1442), mathematician and astronomer
- Regiomontanus (1436-1476), mathematician
- Nicolaus Germanus (1420-1490), geographer
- Nicholas of Cusa (1401-1464), philosopher
- Johannes Widmann (1460-1498), mathematician, The + and - symbols first appeared in print in his book Mercantile Arithmetic or Behende und hüpsche Rechenung auff allen Kauffmanschafft published in Leipzig in 1489 in reference to surpluses and deficits in business problems.
- Henricus Martellus Germanus, geographer
- Jacob Ziegler, scholar and geographer

== 16th century ==
- Eucharius Rösslin (1470-1526), was a German physician who in 1513 authored a book about childbirth called Der Rosengarten (The Rose Garden), which became a standard medical text for midwives.
- Erhard Ratdolt (1442–1528), Bilinen ilk yazıcı tip örneği kitabını üretmesiyle ünlü Matbaacı
- Michael Stifel (1487-1567), mathematician, theologian, He was an Augustinian who was one of the first supporters of Martin Luther. Later in mathematics professor at the University of Jena
- Nicholas Kratzer (1487-1550), mathematician, astronomer and horologist
- Adam Ries (1492-1559), mathematician
- Christoph Rudolff (1499-1545), mathematician, He was a German mathematician who was the author of the first German textbook on algebra
- Jacob Milich (1501-1559), mathematician, physician and astronomer, The crater Milichius on the Moon is named after him
- Petrus Apianus (1495-1552), mathematician, geographer, astronomer
- Philipp Apian (1531-1589), He was a German mathematician and doctor. Son of Petrus Apianus (1495–1552), he is also known as the cartographer of Bavaria.
- Philipp Nicodemus Frischlin (1547-1590), philologist
- Adam Lonicer, Adamus Lonicerus (10 October 1528 – 29 May 1586) was a German botanist best known for his 1557 revised version of Eucharius Rösslin's medicinal plant
- Hieronymus Wolf (1516-1580), historian and humanist, He coined the term Byzantium
- Heinrich Rantzau (1526-1598), humanist
- Nicolaus Reimers (1551-1600), astronomer, mathematician
- Bartholomaeus Pitiscus (1561-1613), mathematician, The scientist who first coined the term trigonometry
- Georg Limnaeus (1554-1611), mathematician and astronomer
- Ludolph van Ceulen (1540-1610), mathematician

== 17th century ==
- Michael Maestlin (1550-1631), mathematician, astronomer, Kepler's mentor
- Johannes Remus Quietanus, astronomer
- Paul Hermann (1645-1696), botanist
- Johannes Kepler (1571-1630), mathematician and astronomer, He is a key figure in the 17th-century Scientific Revolution, best known for his laws of planetary motion, and his books Astronomia nova, Harmonice Mundi, and Epitome Astronomiae Copernicanae, influencing among others Isaac Newton, providing one of the foundations for his theory of universal gravitation.
- Johann Rudolf Glauber (1604-1670), alchemist and chemist, His discovery of sodium sulfate in 1625 led to the compound being named after him: "Glauber's salt".
- Nicholas Mercator (1620-1687), mathematician
- Adam Olearius (1599-1671), geographer
- Hennig Brand (1630-1682), He discovered the chemical element phosphorus.
- Johann Joachim Becher (1635-1682), alchemist, He developed the theory of phlogiston
- David Origanus, astronomer
- Gottfried Wilhelm Leibniz (1646-1716), polymath active as a mathematician, philosopher, scientist and diplomat. Leibniz has been called the "last universal genius" due to his knowledge and skills in different fields and because such people became less common during the Industrial Revolution and spread of specialized labor after his lifetime.
- Otto Von Guericke (1602-1686), physicist, He performed the Magdeburg hemispheres experiment.
- Johann Sperling (1603-1658), was a physician, zoologist and physicist, deacon and Rector of the University of Wittenberg
- Gaspar Schott (1608-1666), specializing in the fields of physics, mathematics and natural philosophy
- Ehrenfried Walther von Tschirnhaus (1651-1708)
- Johann Sturm (1635-1703), philosopher
- Johann Schröder (1600-1664), pharmologist
- Georg Wolfgang Wedel (1645-1721), professor of surgery, botany, theoretical and practical medicine, and chemistry.
- Georg Ernst Stahl (1659-1734), chemist and natural philosophy
- Engelbert Kaempfer (1651-1716), He was a German naturalist, physician, explorer and writer

== 18th century ==
- Georg Wolfgang Wedel (1645–1721), surgery
- Johann Juncker (1679–1759), Juncker was a leader in the Pietist reform movement as it applied to medicine
- Daniel Gabriel Fahrenheit (1686–1736), physicist and engineer
- Christian Goldbach (1690–1764), mathematician
- Andreas Sigismund Marggraf (1709–1782), In 1747, Marggraf announced his discovery of sugar in beets and devised a method using alcohol to extract it
- Johann Daniel Titius (1729–1796), physicist
- Franz Carl Achard (1753–1821), chemist, geoscientist, physicist, and biologist. His principal discovery was the production of sugar from sugar beets

== See also ==
- List of medieval European scientists
- Science and technology in Germany
