= List of German states by research and development spending =

The following is a list of German states by their research and development (R&D) expenditure according to figures from the Federal Ministry of Research, Technology and Space, including as a percentage of the states' respective GRDPs.

Among the 20 European regions that devoted at least 3% of their GDP to R&D in 2005, Germany was the most represented country, with 8 regions featured, including Braunschweig (Lower Saxony) at rank 1 and Stuttgart (Baden-Württemberg) at rank 3.

== List ==
German states by research and development spending in 2024
State	Expenditure (€ billion)	Percent of GRDP
Baden-Württemberg	37.25	5.71
Bavaria	26.98	3.39
Berlin	6.31	3.03
Brandenburg	1.54	1.51
Bremen	1.15	2.77
Hamburg	4.23	2.60
Hesse	12.20	3.28
Mecklenburg-Vorpommern	0.84	1.38
Lower Saxony	10.27	2.67
North Rhine-Westphalia	19.85	2.26
Rhineland-Palatinate	6.65	3.68
Saarland	0.73	1.73
Saxony	3.87	2.37
Saxony-Anhalt	1.16	1.46
Schleswig-Holstein	1.93	1.53
Thuringia	2.01	2.58
Germany	136.97	2.62

== See also ==
- Science and technology in Germany
