= Science and technology in Germany =

Overview of Germany's handling with science and technology

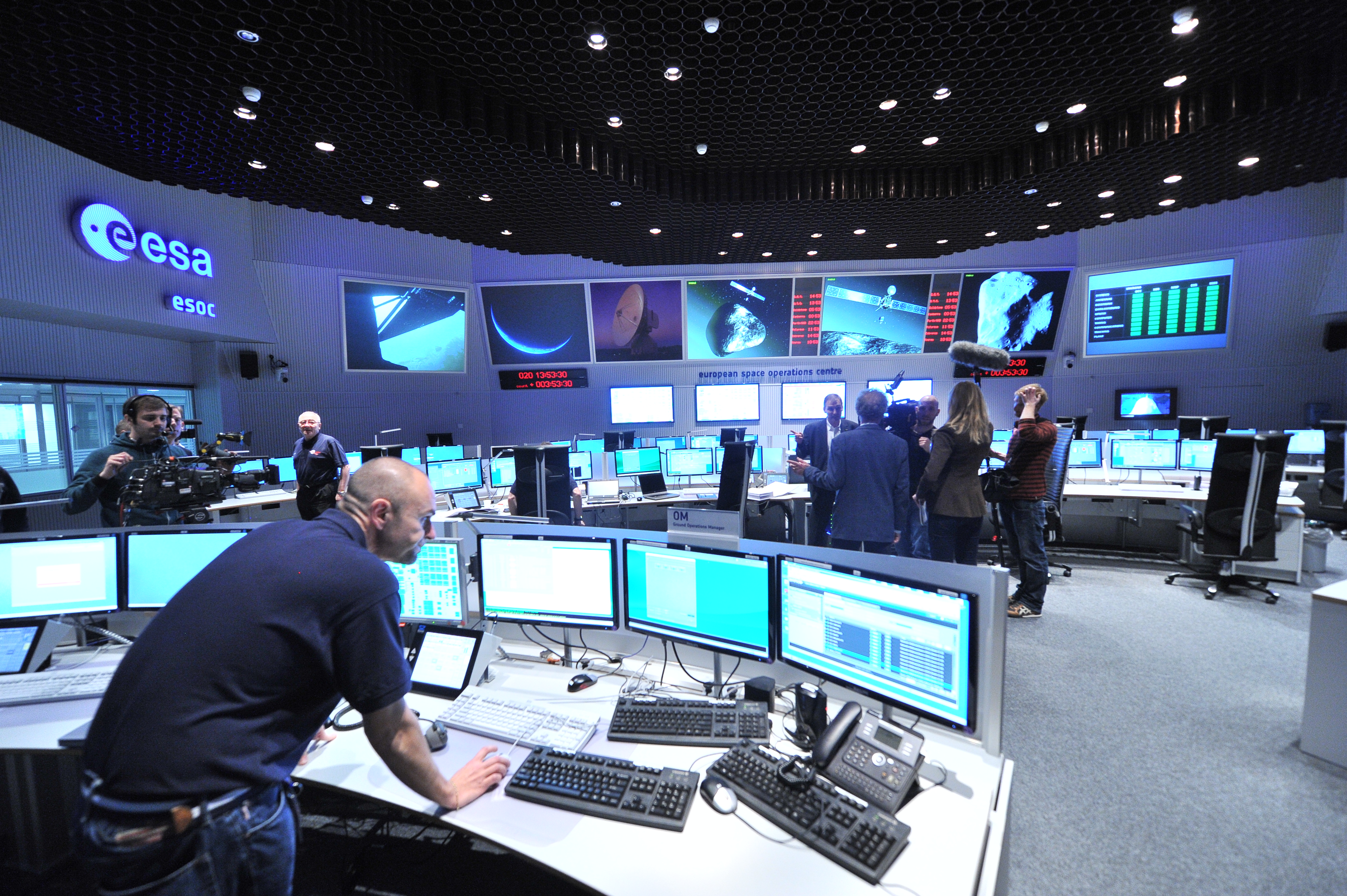
European Space Operations Centre (ESOC) in Darmstadt near Frankfurt

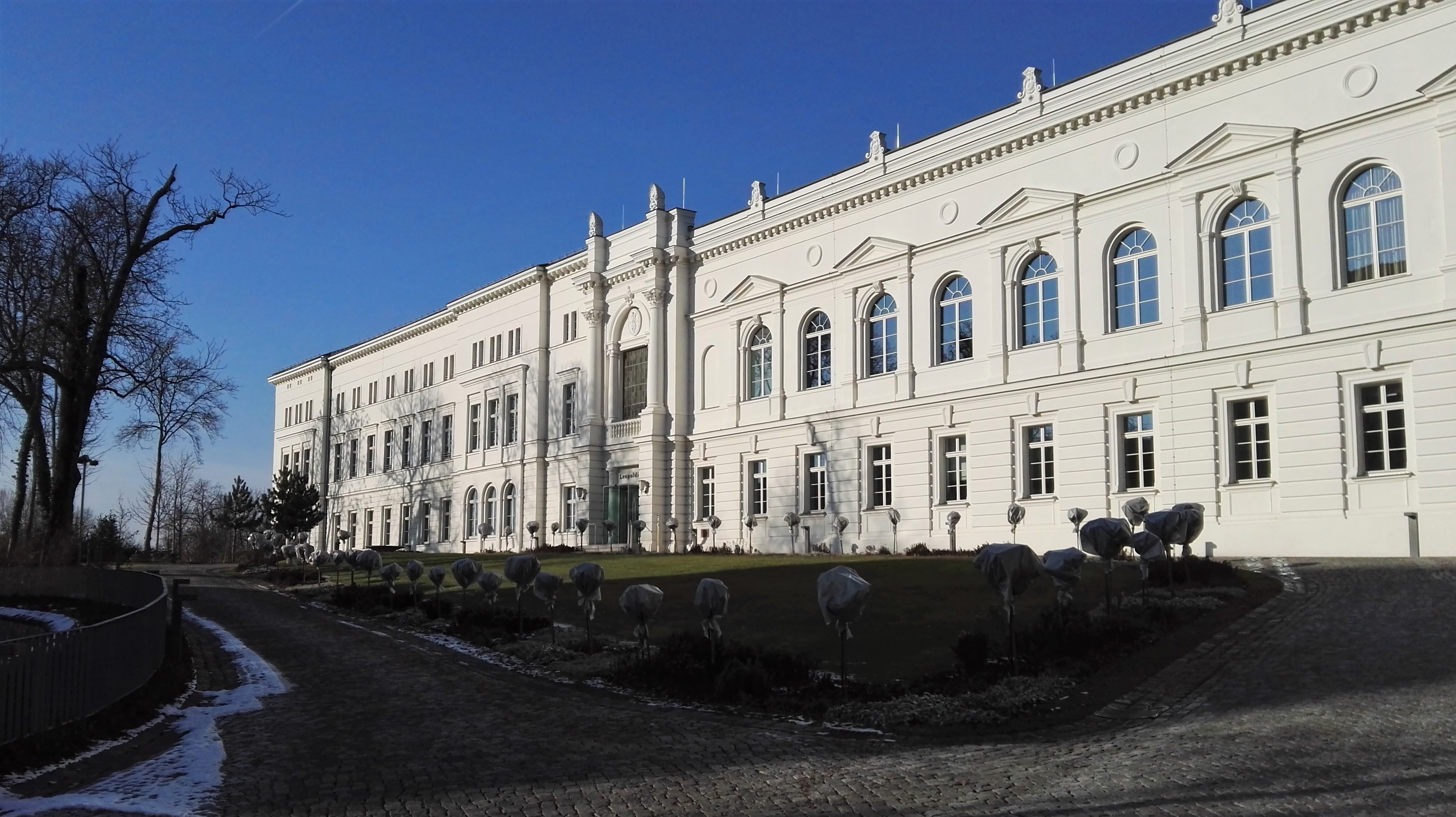
The German National Academy of Sciences Leopoldina, Halle (Saale), the oldest academy of natural sciences worldwide

Science and technology in Germany has a long history, and research and development efforts form an integral part of the country's economy. Germany has been the home of some of the most prominent researchers in various scientific disciplines, notably physics, mathematics, chemistry and engineering. Before World War II, Germany had produced more Nobel laureates in scientific fields than any other nation, and was the preeminent country in the natural sciences. Germany is currently the nation with the 3rd most Nobel Prize winners, 115.

The German language was, along with English and French, one of the leading languages of science from the late 19th century until the end of World War II. After the war, because so many scientific researchers' and teachers' careers had been ended either by Nazi Germany which started a brain drain, the denazification process, the American Operation Paperclip and Soviet Operation Osoaviakhim which exacerbated the brain drain in post-war Germany, or simply losing the war, "Germany, German science, and German as the language of science had all lost their leading position in the scientific community."

Today, scientific research in the country is supported by industry, the network of German universities and scientific state-institutions such as the Max Planck Society and the Deutsche Forschungsgemeinschaft. The raw output of scientific research from Germany consistently ranks among the world's highest. Germany was declared the most innovative country in the world in the 2020 Bloomberg Innovation Index and was ranked 11th in the Global Innovation Index in 2025 and 2026

== Institutions ==
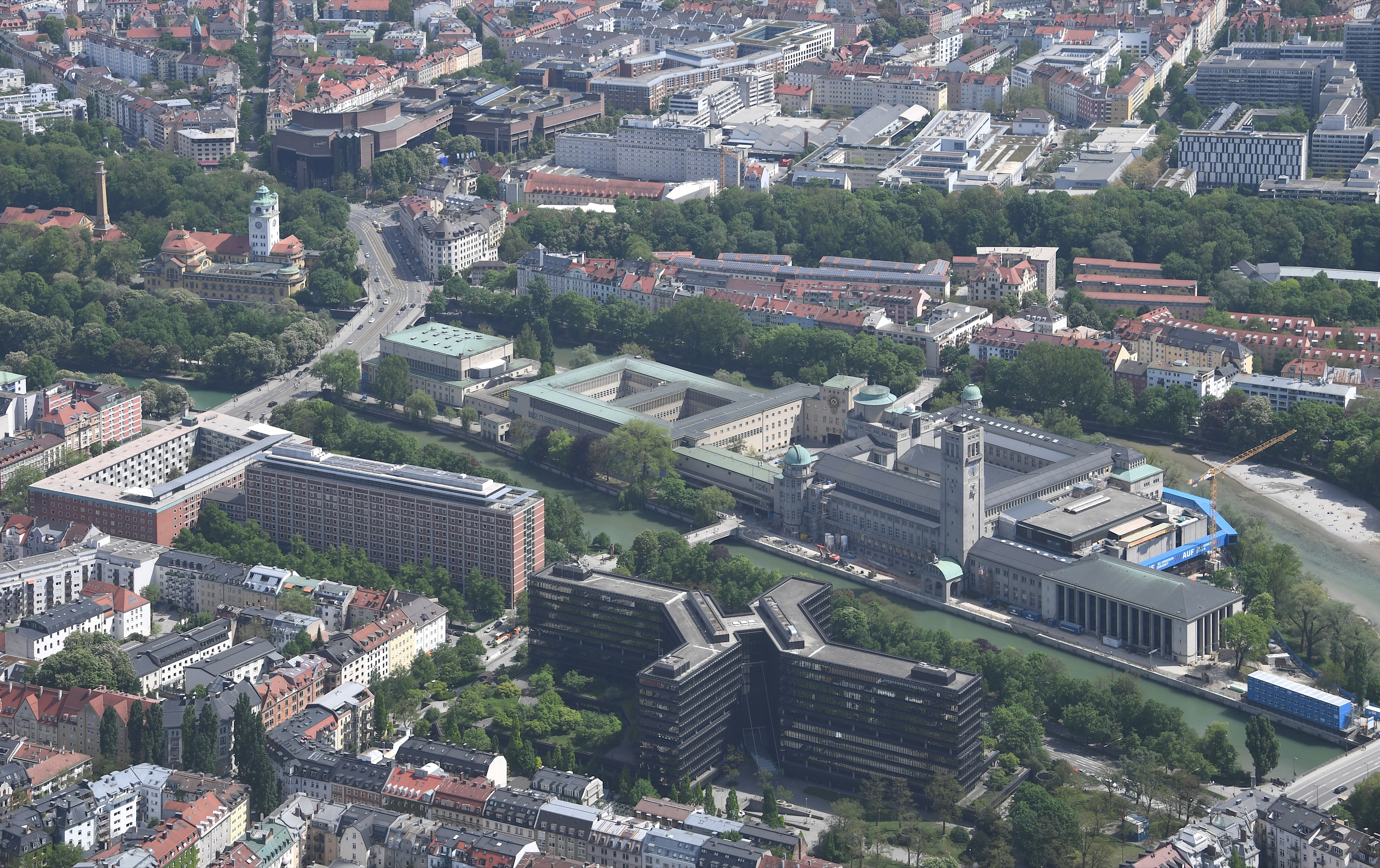
Aerial image of the science museum "Deutsches Museum" (center) in the city center of Munich on an island of the Isar river

The Union of German Academies of Sciences and Humanities (abbreviated Academies Union) is an association of the eight largest academies of sciences in Germany.

The Deutsches Museum, 'German Museum' of Masterpieces of Science and Technology in Munich is one of the largest science and technology museums in the world in terms of exhibition space, with about 28,000 exhibited objects from 50 fields of science and technology.

The Bundesministerium für Forschung, Technologie und Raumfahrt, 'Federal Ministry of Research, Technology and Space' (BMFTR) is a supreme authority of the Federal Republic of Germany for science and technology. The headquarter of the Federal Ministry is located in Bonn, the second office in Berlin. It was founded in 1972 as Federal Ministry of Research and Technology (BMFT) to promote basic research, applied research and technological development.

Federal Ministry for Economic Affairs and Climate Action (German: Bundesministerium für Wirtschaft und Klimaschutz (BMWK, previous BMWi)

=== Foundations ===
- Alexander von Humboldt Foundation
- Deutsche Forschungsgemeinschaft (DFG, German Research association)
- German Academic Exchange Service (DAAD), promoting international exchange of scientists and students)
- The Fritz Thyssen Stiftung, 'Fritz Thyssen Foundation' supports young scientists and research projects. It was founded in 1959 and is located in Cologne. The purpose of the foundation, with an endowment capital of €542.4 million, is to promote science at scientific universities and research institutes, primarily in Germany, under particular consideration on young scientists.

=== National science libraries ===
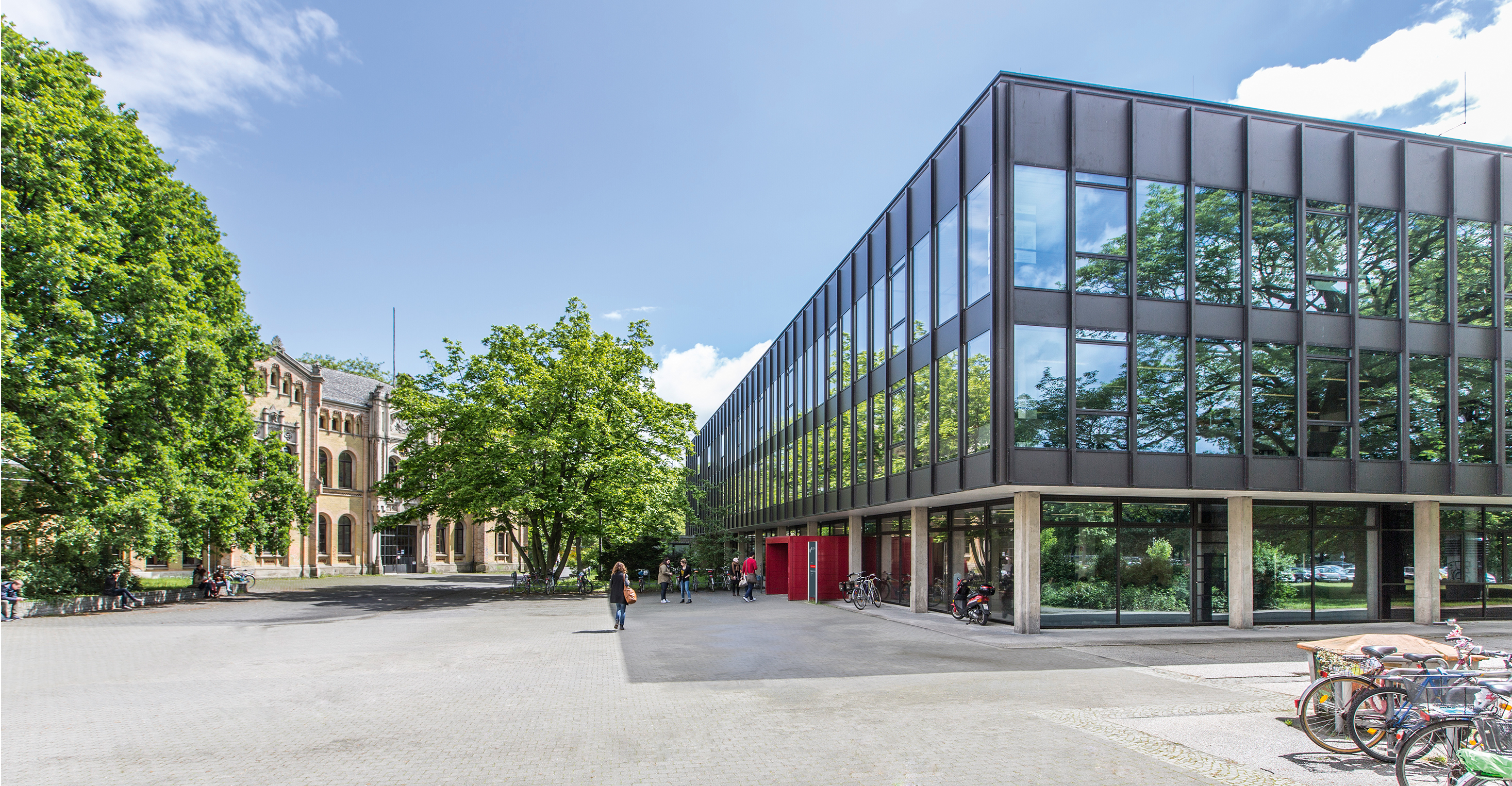
Main entrance of TIB, Hanover

- German National Library of Economics (ZWB), Kiel & Hamburg
- German National Library of Medicine (ZB MED), Cologne & Bonn
- German National Library of Science and Technology (TIB), Hanover

=== Research organizations ===
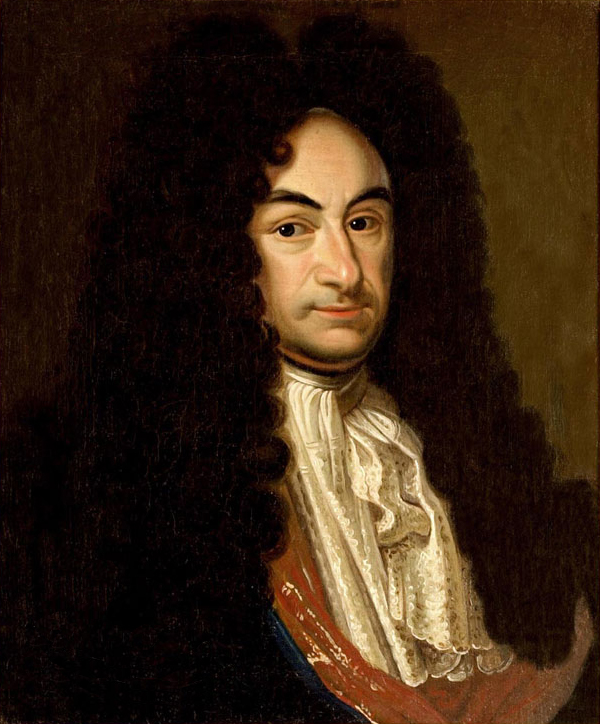
Portrait of Gottfried Wilhelm Leibniz

- Helmholtz Association of German Research Centres (complex systems und large-scale research), Bonn & Berlin
- Fraunhofer Society (applied research and mission oriented research, Munich)
- Leibniz Association (fundamental and applied research), Berlin
- Max Planck Society (fundamental research), Munich
- Gesellschaft für Angewandte Mathematik und Mechanik ("Society of Applied Mathematics and Mechanics"), Dresden
- The Hasso Plattner Institute (HPI), officially: Hasso Plattner Institute for Digital Engineering gGmbH, is a privately financed IT institute and, together with the University of Potsdam, forms the Digital Engineering Faculty. It is located in Potsdam-Babelsberg and researches practical and applied topics in digital technologies. Its founder and namesake is SAP founder Hasso Plattner.

=== Prize committees ===
- The Gottfried Wilhelm Leibniz Prize is granted to ten scientists and academics every year. With a maximum of €2.5 million per award it is one of highest endowed research prizes in the world. The prize and the mentioned organization above is named after the German polymath and philosopher Gottfried Wilhelm Leibniz (1646–1716), who was a contemporary and competitor of Isaac Newton (1642–1727).
- The Bunsen–Kirchhoff Award is a prize for "outstanding achievements" in the field of analytical spectroscopy. The prize is named in honor of chemist Robert Bunsen and physicist Gustav Kirchhoff (→ Physics).
- The Helmholtz Prize is awarded with €20,000 every two to three years to European scientists for scientific and technological research in metrology.

== Scientific fields ==
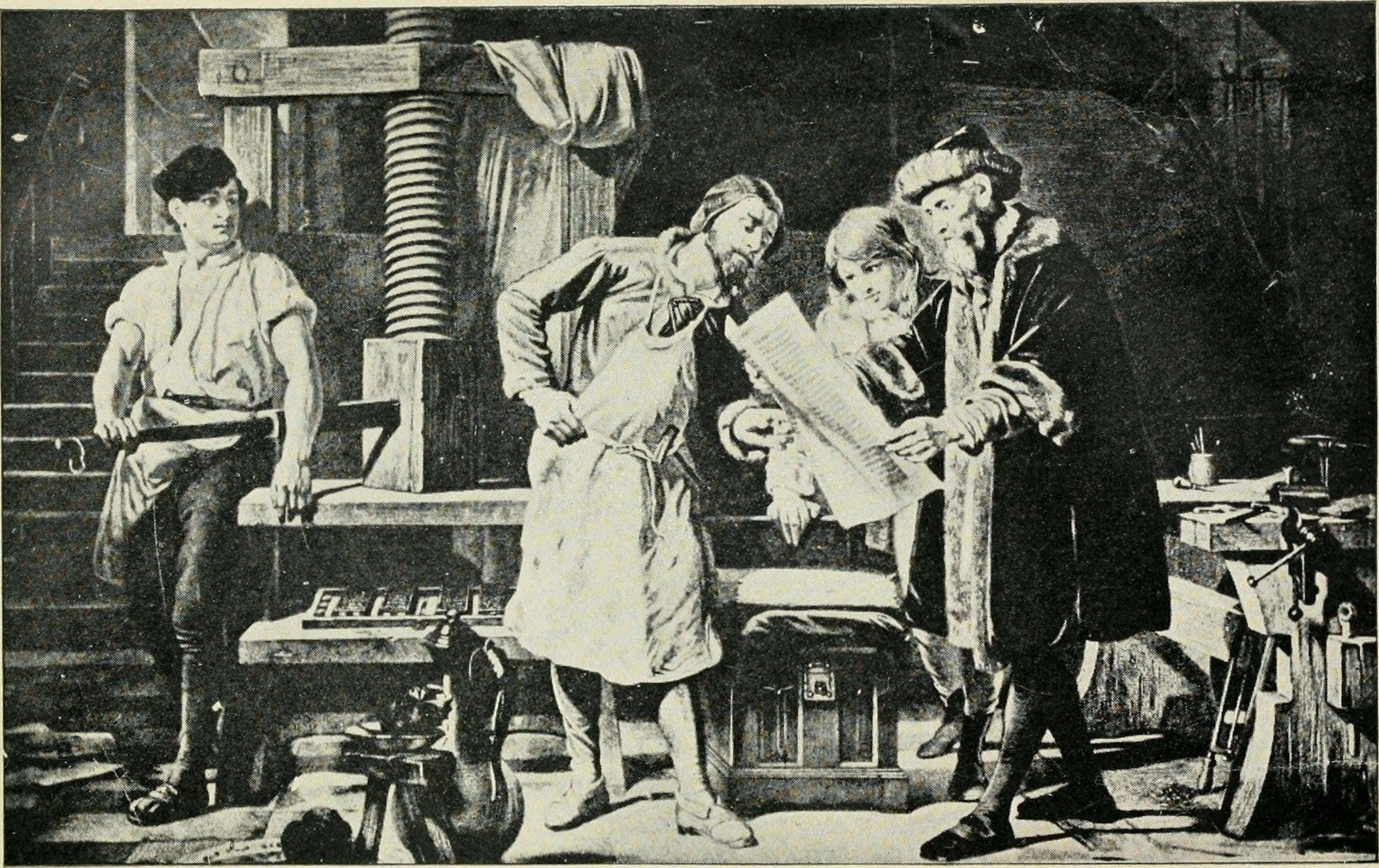
Johannes Gutenberg, 1904 reconstruction

The global spread of the printing press with movable types and an oil-based ink was a process that began around 1440 with the invention of the printing press by Johannes Gutenberg (c. 1400–1468) in the Free City of Mainz and continued until the introduction of printing based on this procedure in all parts of the world in the 19th century, thus creating the conditions for the dissemination of generally accessible scientific publications emerging to the revolution of science.

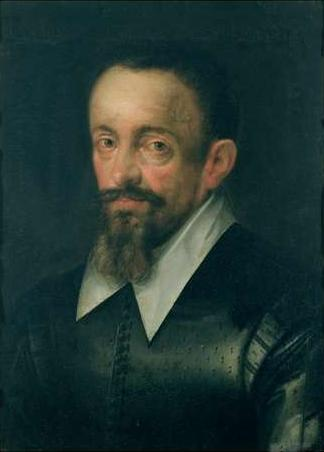
Probably a contemporary portrait of Johannes Kepler painted around 1612. Kepler was one of the founders and fathers of modern astronomy, the scientific method, natural and modern science.

=== Scientific Revolution ===
Johannes Kepler (1571–1630) was one of the originators of the Scientific Revolution of the 16th and 17th centuries as an astronomer, physicist, mathematician and natural philosopher. He advocated the idea of a heliocentric model of the Solar System, which can be traced back to the theories of the ancient Greek astronomers Aristarchus of Samos and Seleucus of Seleucia, as well as to the 16th-century astronomer Nicolaus Copernicus (1473–1543), whose main work De revolutionibus orbium coelestium, 'On the Revolutions of the Heavenly Spheres' about the heliocentric model was first published by Johannes Petreius (c. 1497–1550) and likely the polymath Johannes Schöner (1477–1547) in the Free Imperial City of Nuremberg in 1543. In March 1600, Kepler became assistant to the astronomer Tycho Brahe (1546–1601) at the court of Emperor Rudolf II in Prague, Kingdom of Bohemia. After Brahe's death in October of the next year, Kepler succeeded him as imperial mathematician and court astronomer (until 1627).

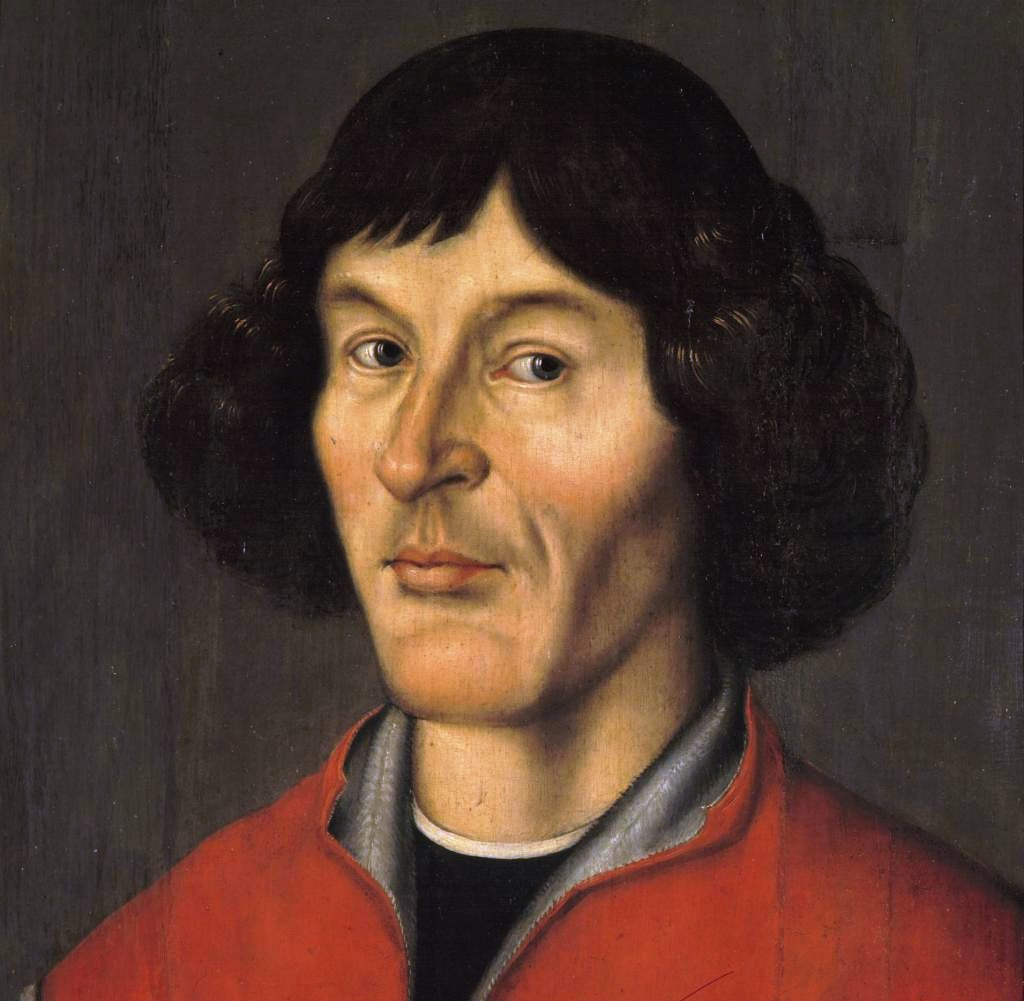
Nicolaus Copernicus, often named the originator of the Scientific Revolution

Johannes Kepler discovered the laws according to which planets are moving around the Sun, who were called Kepler's laws after him. With his introduction to calculating with logarithms, Kepler contributed to the spread of this type of calculation. In mathematics, a numerical method for calculating the volume of wine barrels with integrals was named former Kepler's barrel rule. He made optics to a subject of scientific investigation and confirmed the discoveries made with the telescope by his Italian contemporary Galileo Galilei (1564–1642). He worked on the theory of the telescope and invented the refracting astronomical or Keplerian telescope, which involved a considerable improvement over the Galilean telescope. Kepler also made the invention of the valveless gear pump, because a mine owner needed a device to pump water out of his mine.

=== Physics ===
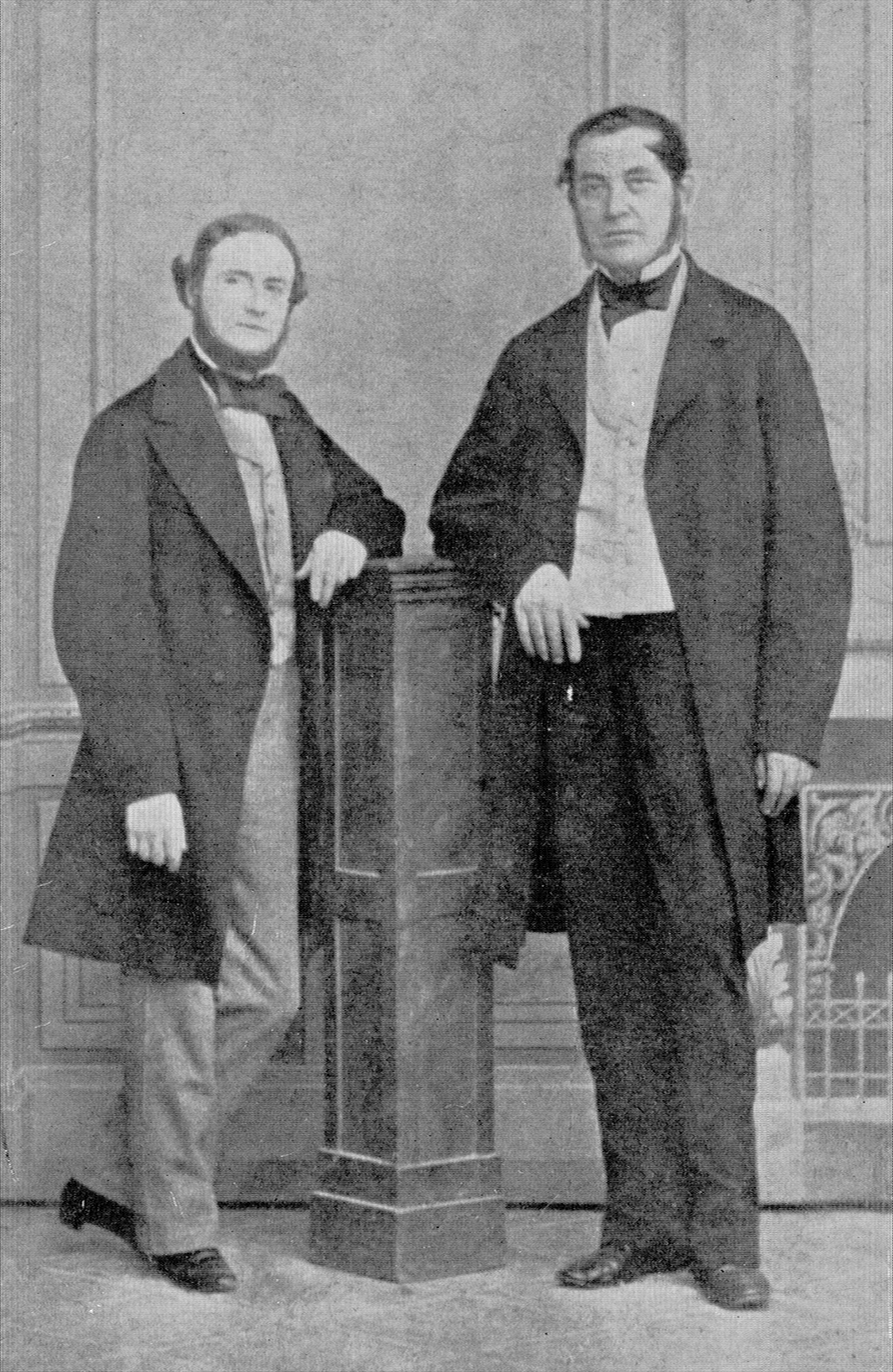
Gustav Kirchhoff (left) and Robert Bunsen (right), photograph c. 1850

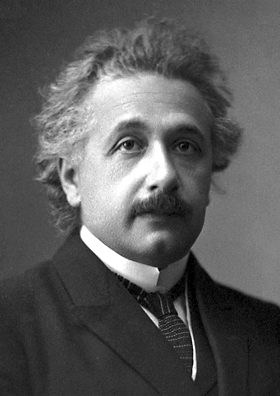
Albert Einstein was a German-born theoretical physicist.

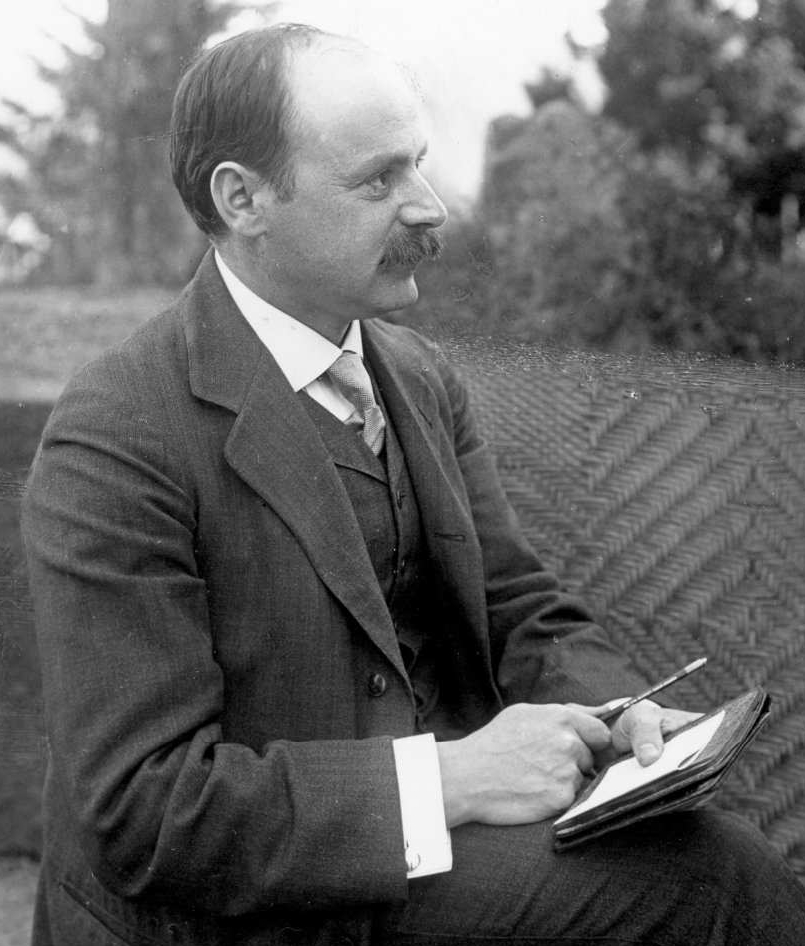
Karl Schwarzschild

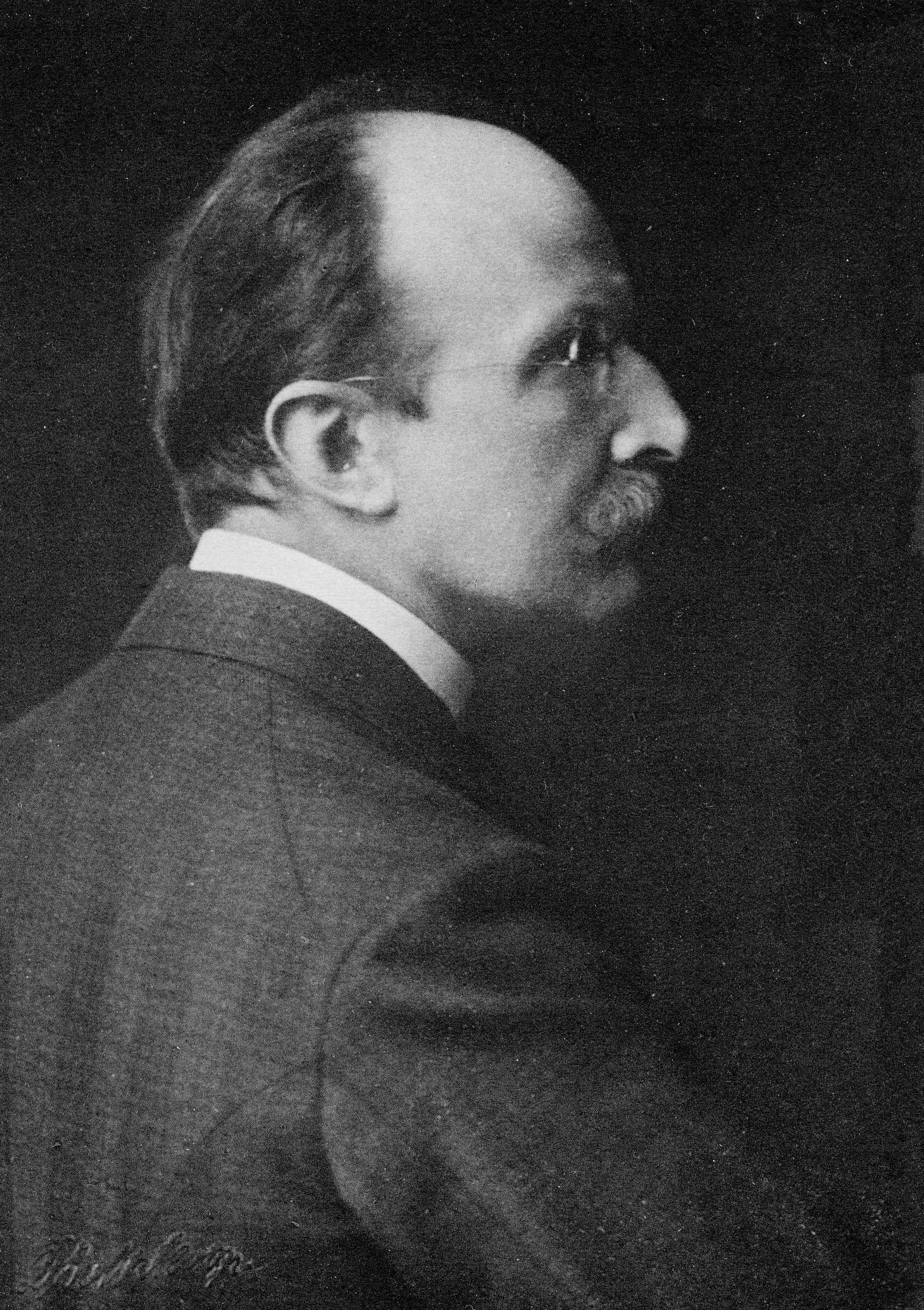
Max Planck

Otto von Guericke (1602–1686) was a scientist, inventor, mathematician and physicist from Magdeburg. He is best known for his experiments on air pressure using the Magdeburg hemispheres. With the invention of the vacuum pump he laid the foundation of vacuum technology.

Daniel Gabriel Fahrenheit (1686–1736) was a physicist and inventor of measuring instruments from Danzig. The temperature unit degrees Fahrenheit (°F) was named after him.

Gustav Kirchhoff (1824–1887) was a physicist from Königsberg who made a particular contribution to the study of electricity. Today, Kirchhoff is best known for Kirchhoff's circuit laws, and for introducing the concept of a black body, which contributed to the emergence of quantum mechanics. However, Kirchhoff's circuit laws were discovered as early as 1833 by Carl Friedrich Gauss (1777–1855) during his experiments on electricity. With Robert Bunsen (1811–1899) he developed flame spectroscopy in 1859, which can be used to detect chemical elements with high specificity. Bunsen was a chemist from Göttingen, and together with Kirchhoff discovered the elements caesium and rubidium in 1861. He perfected the Bunsen burner, which is named after him, and invented the Bunsen cell and a grease-spot photometer.

The work of Albert Einstein (1879–1955), best known for developing the theory of relativity, and Max Planck (1858–1947), he is known for the Planck constant, was crucial to the foundation of modern physics, which Werner Heisenberg (1901–1976) and Erwin Schrödinger (1887–1961) developed further. They were preceded by such key physicists as Joseph von Fraunhofer (1787–1826), who discovered the Fraunhofer lines in spectroscopy, and Hermann von Helmholtz (1821–1894), among others. Wilhelm Conrad Röntgen (1845–1923) discovered X-rays in 1895, an accomplishment that made him the first winner of the Nobel Prize in Physics in 1901 and eventually earned him an element name, roentgenium. Heinrich Rudolf Hertz's (1857–1894) work in the domain of electromagnetic radiation were pivotal to the development of modern telecommunication; the unit of frequency was named in his honor "Hertz". Mathematical aerodynamics was developed in Germany, especially by Ludwig Prandtl.

Karl Schwarzschild (1873–1916) was an astrophysicist from Frankfurt am Main. He was professor and director of the Göttingen Observatory from 1901 to 1909. There he was able to work together with scientists like David Hilbert (1862–1943) and Hermann Minkowski (1864–1909). Schwarzschild works on relativity provided the first exact solutions to the field equations of Albert Einstein's general relativity – one for an uncharged, non-rotating spherically symmetric body and one for a static isotropic void around a solid body. Schwarzschild did some fundamental works on classical black holes. This is why some properties of black holes got their name, namely the Schwarzschild metric and the Schwarzschild radius. The center of a non-rotating, uncharged black hole is called the Schwarzschild singularity.

Paul Forman in 1971 argued the remarkable scientific achievements in quantum physics were the cross-product of the hostile intellectual atmosphere whereby many scientists rejected Weimar Germany and Jewish scientists, revolts against causality, determinism and materialism, and the creation of the revolutionary new theory of quantum mechanics. The scientists adjusted to the intellectual environment by dropping Newtonian causality from quantum mechanics, thereby opening up an entirely new and highly successful approach to physics. The "Forman Thesis" has generated an intense debate among historians of science.

==== Deutsche Physik ====
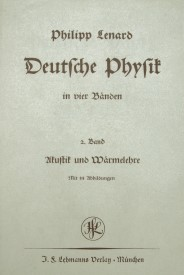
Philipp Lenard, Deutsche Physik, 1936–1937

The so-called Deutsche Physik, 'German physics' was a movement that some German physicists hold during the Nazi period, which mixed physics with racist views. They rejected new discoveries in physics as being too theoretical and advocated a stronger emphasis on empirical evidence. This physics was influenced by anti-Semitic ideas that were widespread in the polarized political climate of the Weimar Republic. In addition, some leading theoretical physicists at that time were of Jewish descent. Leading representatives of this ideology were the Bavarian physicist Johannes Stark (1874–1957, Nobel Prize in Physics in 1919) and the German-Hungarian physicist Philipp Lenard (1862–1947, Nobel Prize winner of 1905). Notably, the latter labeled Albert Einstein's contributions to science as Jewish physics.

=== Chemistry ===
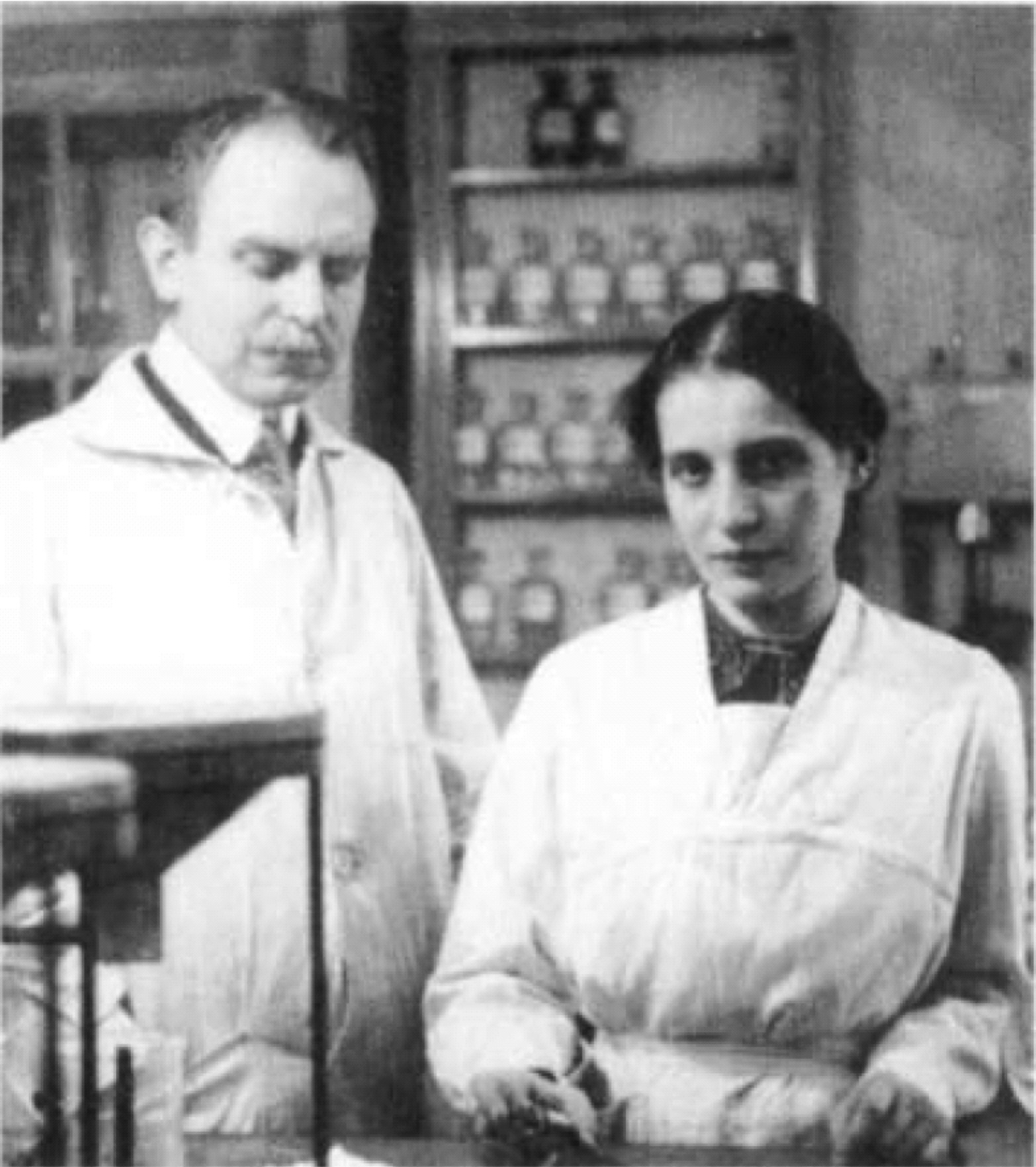
Otto Hahn and Lise Meitner at their laboratory in Berlin from the Kaiser-Wilhelm-Gesellschaft in 1912

Georgius Agricola gave chemistry its modern name. He is generally referred to as the father of mineralogy and as the founder of geology as a scientific discipline.

Justus von Liebig (1803–1873) made major contributions to agricultural and biological chemistry, and is one of the principal founders of organic chemistry.

At the start of the 20th century, Germany garnered fourteen of the first thirty-one Nobel Prizes in Chemistry, starting with Hermann Emil Fischer (1852–1919) in 1902 and until Carl Bosch (1874–1940) and Friedrich Bergius (1884–1949) in 1931.

Otto Hahn (1879–1968) was a pioneer of radioactivity and radiochemistry with the discovery of nuclear fission together with the Austrian scientist Lise Meitner (1878–1968) and Fritz Strassmann (1902–1980) in 1938, the scientific and technological basis for the utilization of atomic energy.

The bio-chemist Adolf Butenandt (1903–1995) independently worked out the molecular structure of the primary male sex hormone of testosterone and was the first to successfully synthesize it from cholesterol in 1935.

=== Engineering ===
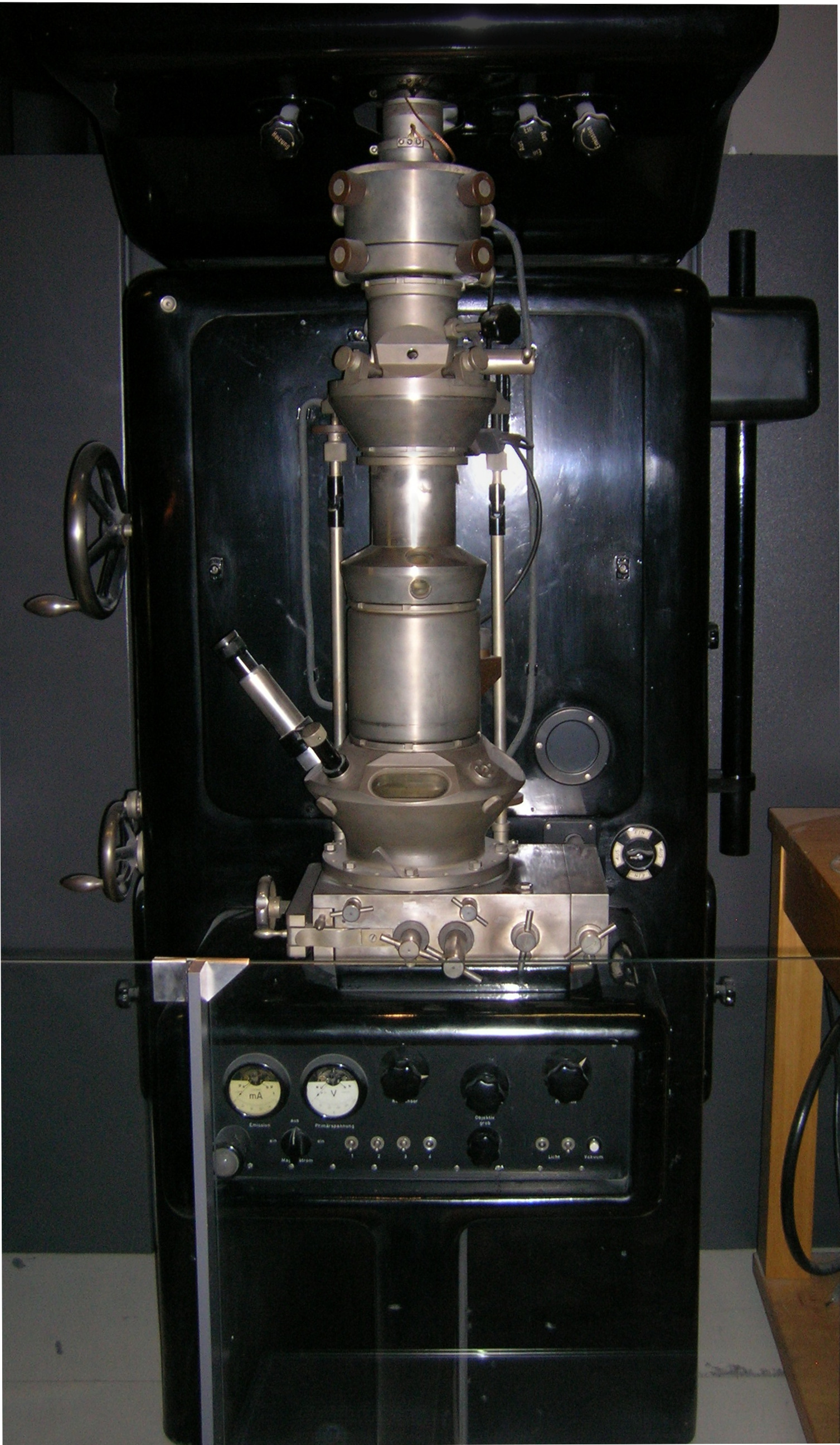
Replica of the first electron microscope from 1933 by Ernst Ruska

Germany has been the home of many famous inventors and engineers, such as Johannes Gutenberg, who is credited with the invention of movable type printing press in Europe; Hans Geiger, the creator of the Geiger counter; and Konrad Zuse, who built the first electronic computer. German inventors, engineers and industrialists such as Zeppelin, Siemens, Daimler, Otto, Wankel, Von Braun and Benz helped shape modern automotive and air transportation technology including the beginnings of space travel. The engineer Otto Lilienthal laid some of the fundamentals for the science of aviation.

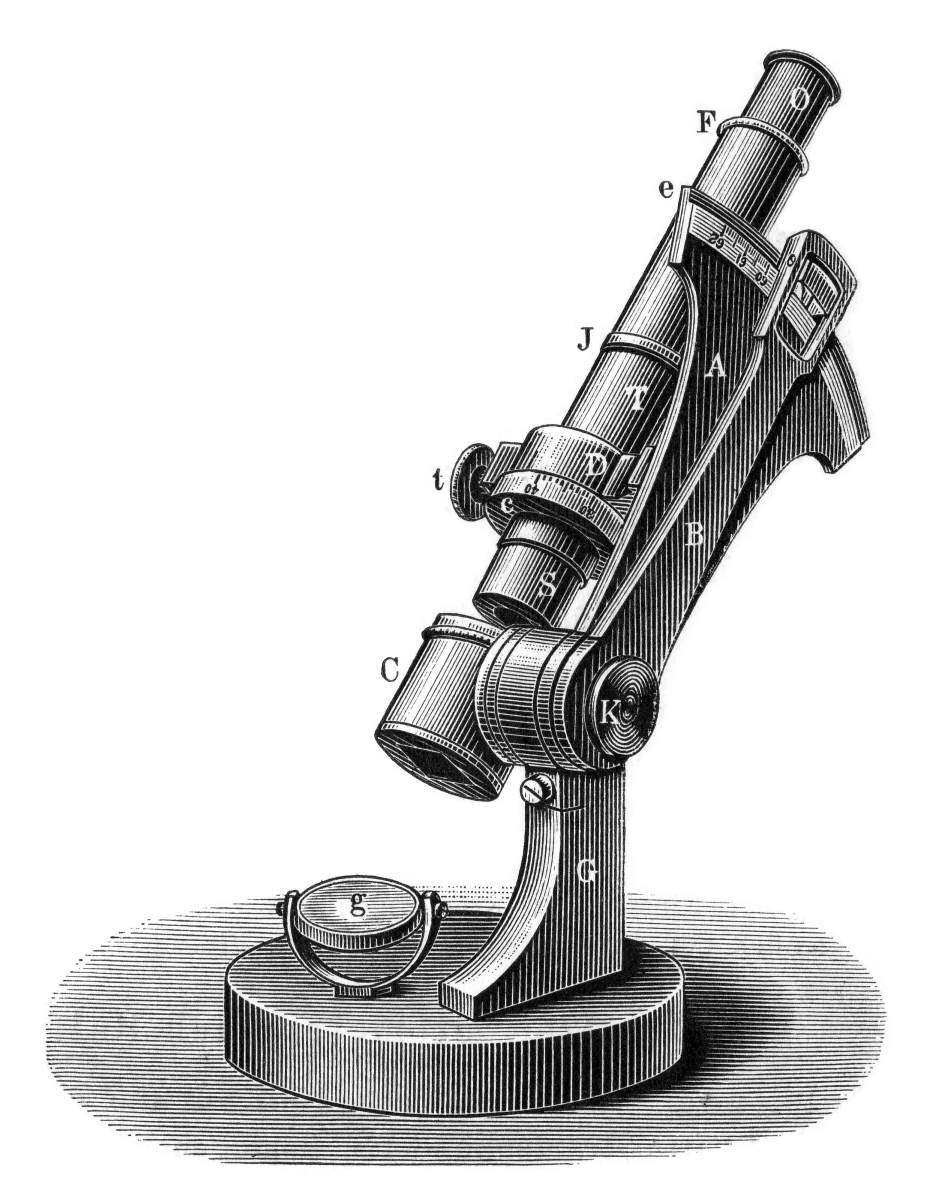
Abbe refractometer 1897

The physicist and optician Ernst Abbe (1840–1905) founded in the 19th century together with the entrepreneurs Carl Zeiss (1840–1905) and Otto Schott (1851–1935) the basics of modern Optical engineering and developed many optical instruments like microscopes and telescopes. Since 1899 he was the sole owner of the Carl Zeiss AG and played a decisive role of setting up the enterprise Jenaer Glaswerk Schott & Gen (today Schott AG). These enterprises are very successful worldwide up to present time (21st century).

The engineer Rudolf Diesel (1858–1913) was the inventor of an internal combustion engine, the Diesel engine. He first published his idea of an engine with a particularly high level of efficiency in 1893 in his work Theorie und Konstruktion eines rationellen Wärmemotors, 'Theory and Construction of a Rational Heat Motor'. After 1893, he succeeded in building such an engine in a laboratory at the Augsburg Machine Factory (now MAN). Through his patents registered in many countries and his public relations work, he gave his name to the engine and the associated Diesel fuel.

In the 1930s the electrical engineers Ernst Ruska (1906–1988) and Max Knoll (1897–1969) developed at the "Technische Hochschule zu Berlin" the first electron microscope.

Manfred von Ardenne (1907–1997) was a scientist, engineer and active as a researcher primarily in applied physics and is the originator of around 600 inventions and patents in radio and television technology, electron microscopy, nuclear, plasma and medical technology.

=== Biological and earth sciences ===
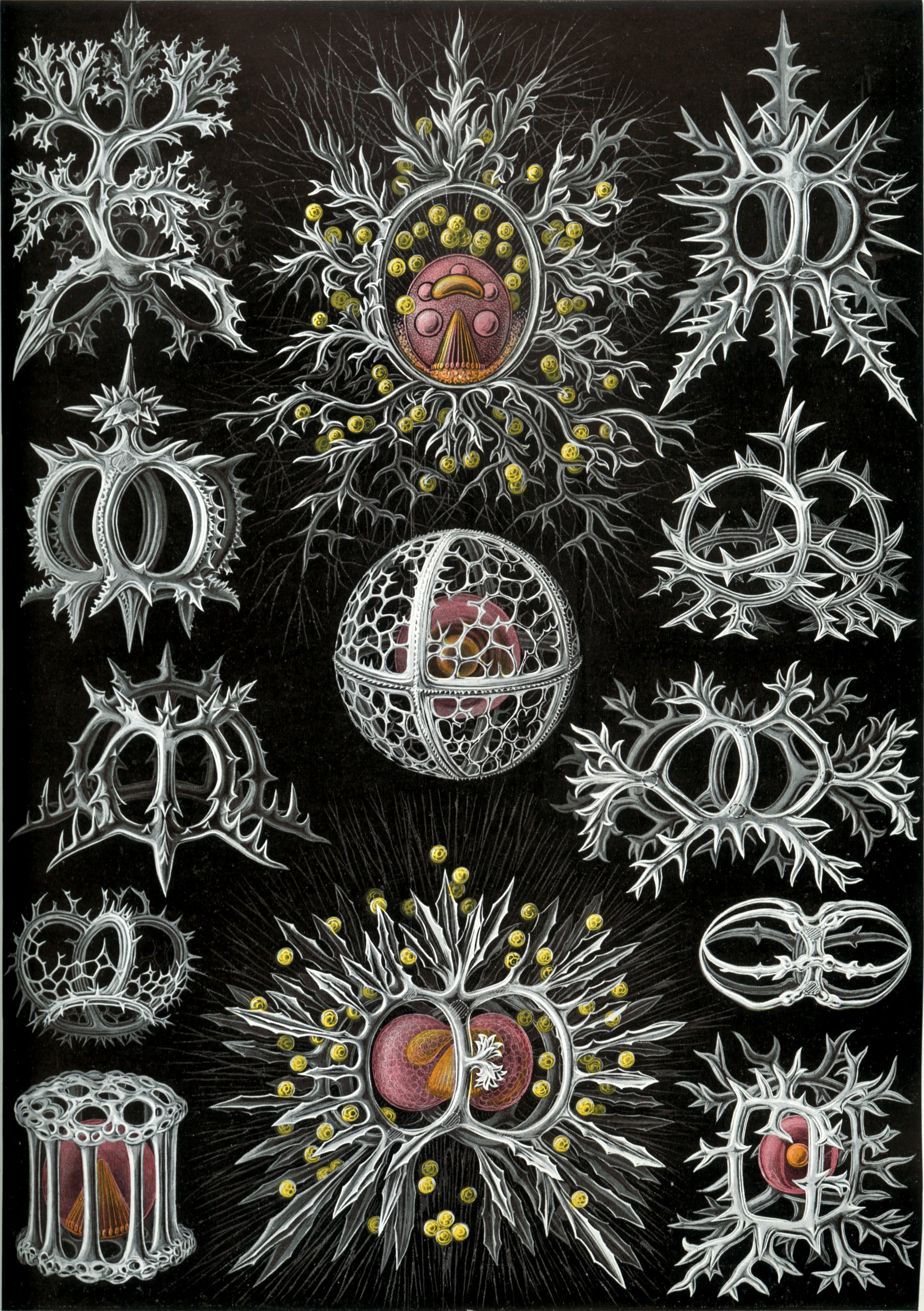
Radiolarians: Picture plate Nr. 71 from Kunstformen der Natur ("Art Forms of Nature"), 1899 by Ernst Haeckel

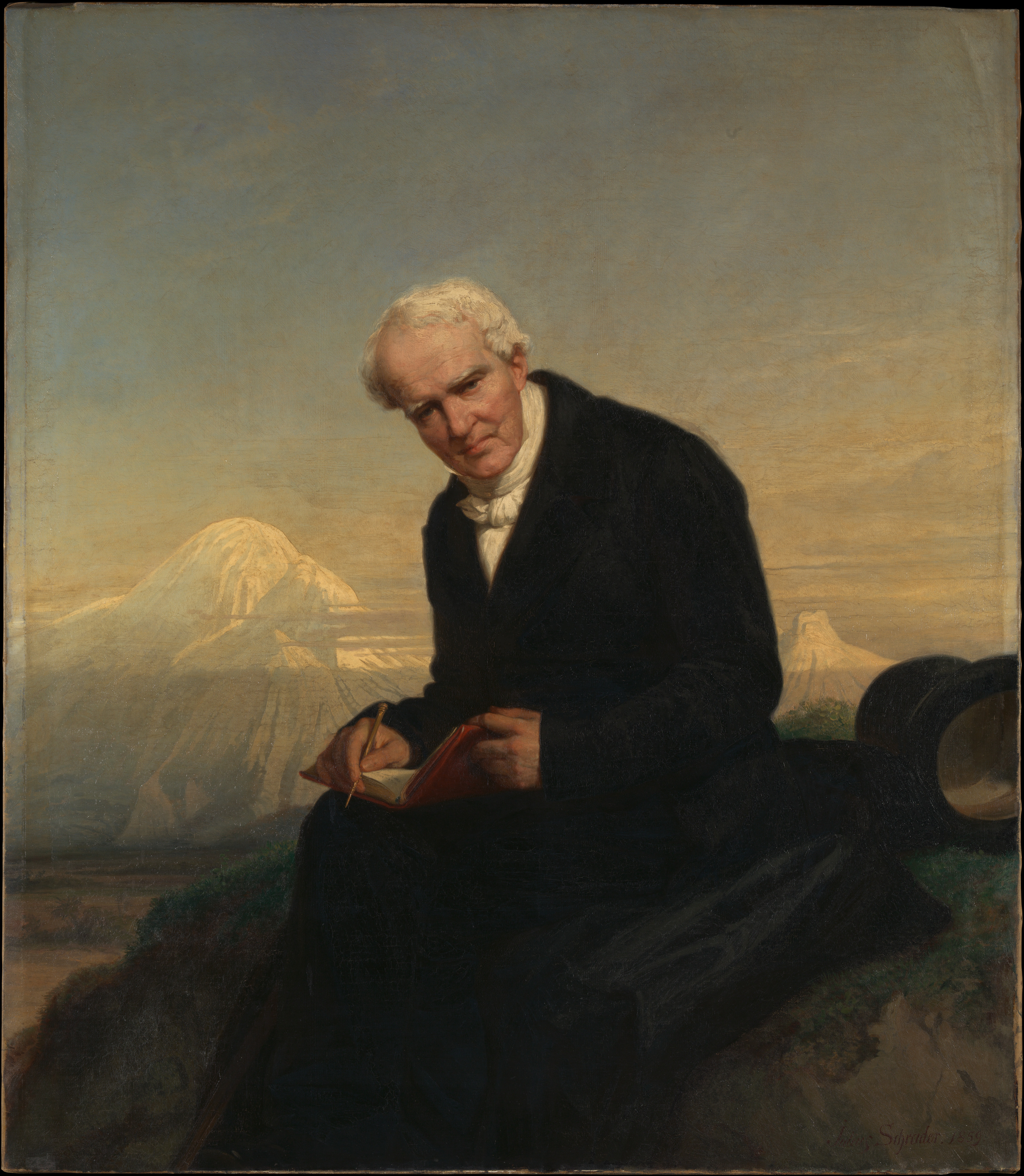
Alexander von Humboldt in front of the Chimborazo, oil on canvas by Julius Schrader 1859, Metropolitan Museum of Art New York

Martin Waldseemüller (c. 1472/1475–1520) and Matthias Ringmann (1482–1511) were cartographers of the Renaissance. In 1507 they created the first world map on which the land masses in the west of the Atlantic Ocean were named "America" after Amerigo Vespucci. The Waldseemüller map of 1507 has been part of the UNESCO World Documentary Heritage since 2005.

Emil Behring, Ferdinand Cohn, Paul Ehrlich, Robert Koch, Friedrich Loeffler and Rudolf Virchow, six key figures in microbiology, were from Germany. Alexander von Humboldt's (1769–1859) work as a natural scientist and explorer was foundational to biogeography, he was one of the outstanding scientists of his time and a shining example for Charles Darwin. Wladimir Köppen (1846–1940) was an eclectic Russian-born botanist and climatologist who synthesized global relationships between climate, vegetation and soil types into a classification system that is used, with some modifications, to this day. The Frankfurt surgeon, botanist, microbiologist, and mycologist Anton de Bary (1831–1888) laid one of the fundamentals of the plant pathology and was one of the discoverer of the symbiosis of organisms.

Ernst Haeckel (1834 – 1919) discovered, described and named thousands of new species, mapped a tree of life relating all life forms and coined many terms in biology, for example ecology and phylum. His published artwork of different lifeforms includes over 100 detailed, multi-colour illustrations of animals and sea creatures, collected in his Kunstformen der Natur, 'Art Forms of Nature', an international bestseller and a book that would go on to influence the Art Nouveau (Jugendstil, 'youth style'). But Haeckel was also a promoter of scientific racism and embraced the idea of Social Darwinism.

Alfred Wegener (1880–1930), a similarly interdisciplinary scientist, was one of the first people to hypothesize the theory of continental drift that was later developed into the overarching geological theory of plate tectonics.

=== Psychology ===
Wilhelm Wundt is credited with the establishment of psychology as an independent empirical science through his construction of the first laboratory at the University of Leipzig in 1879.

In the beginning of the 20th century, the Kaiser Wilhelm Institute founded by Oskar and Cécile Vogt was among the world's leading institutions in the field of brain research. They collaborated with Korbinian Brodmann to map areas of the cerebral cortex.

After the National Socialistic laws banning Jewish doctors in 1933, the fields of neurology and psychiatry faced a decline of 65% of its professors and teachers. The research shifted to a 'Nazi neurology', with subjects such as eugenics or euthanasia.

=== Humanities ===
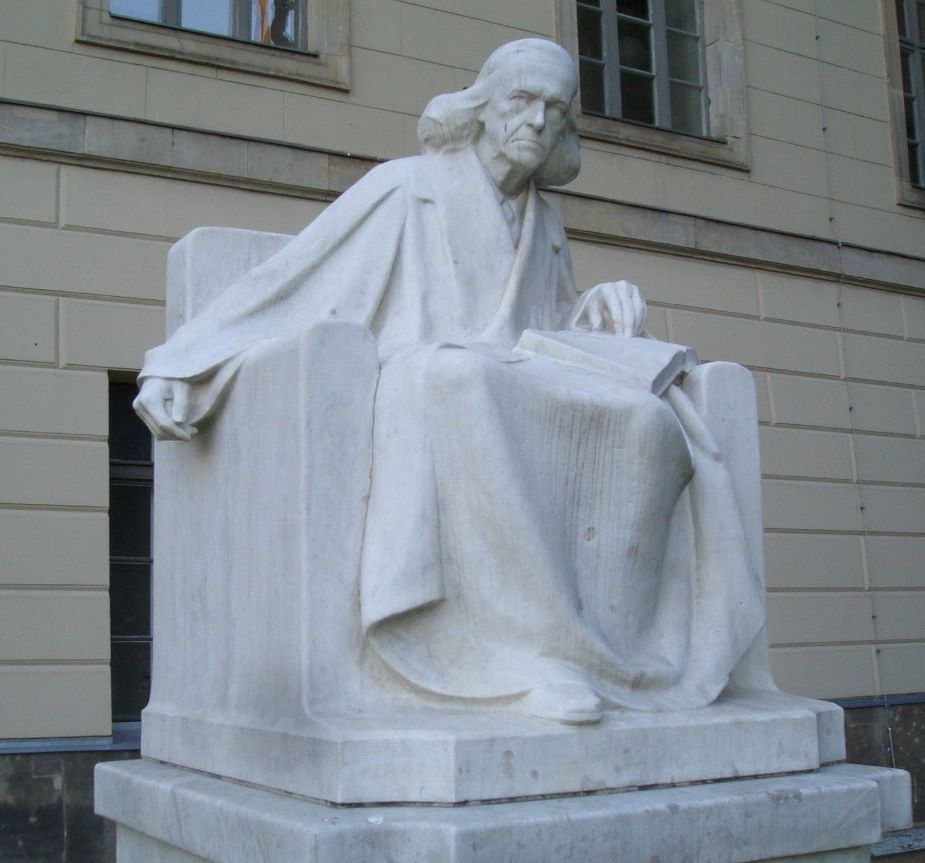
Monument to the Nobel Prize laureate of 1902 Theodor Mommsen by Adolf Brütt (1909), in the yard of the Humboldt University of Berlin

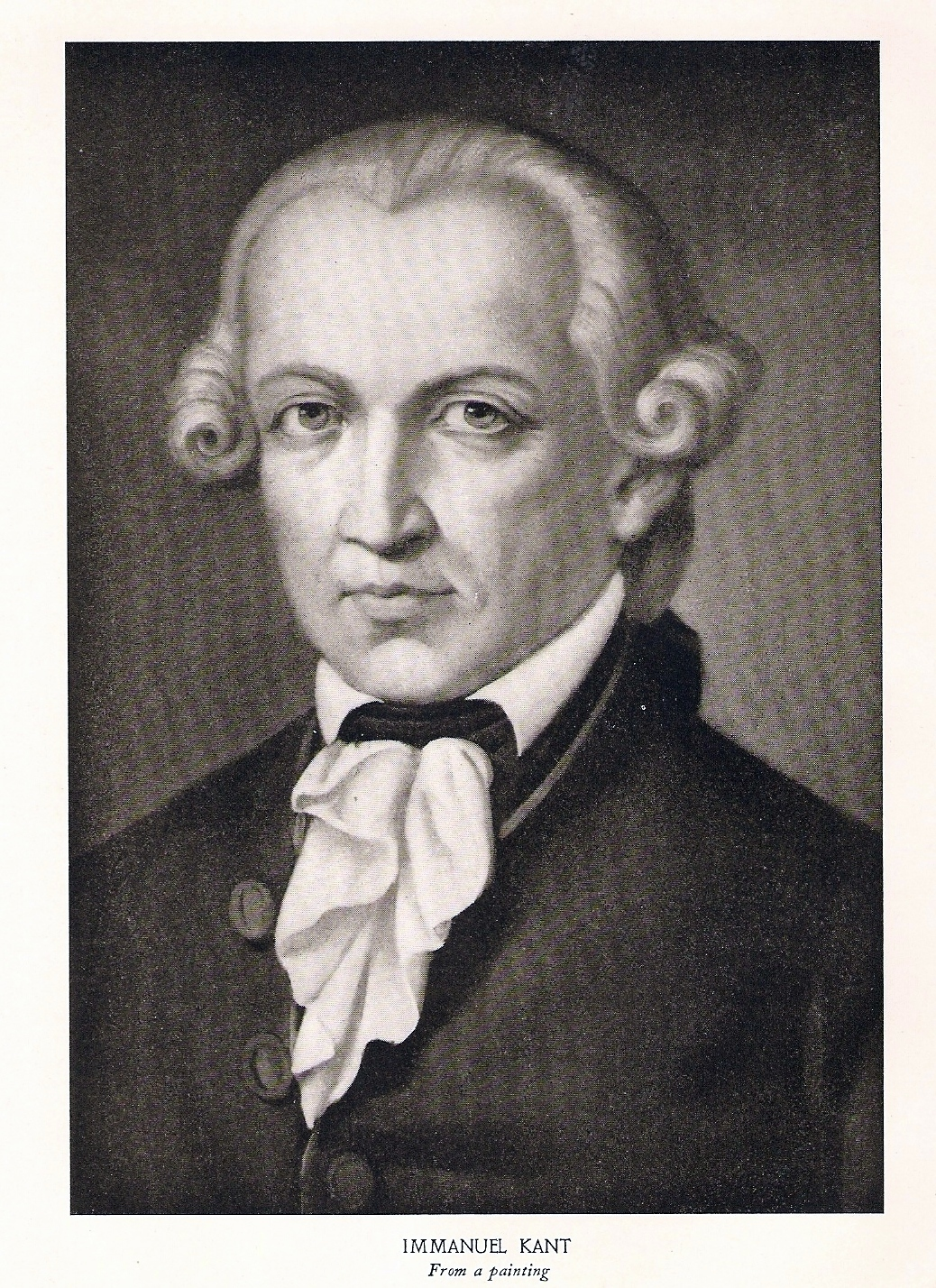
Immanuel Kant engraving

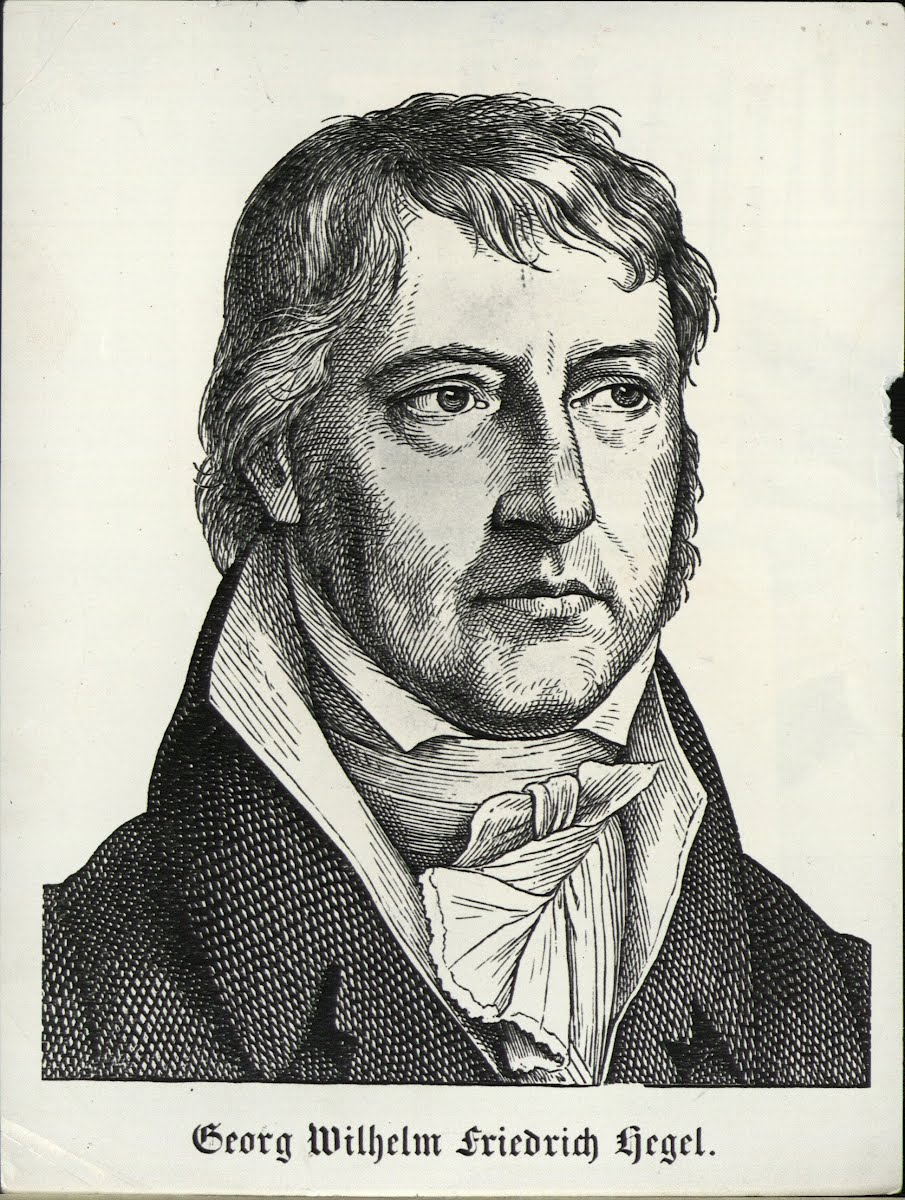
Hegel

Besides natural sciences, German researchers have added much to the development of humanities.

Albertus Magnus (c. 1200–1280) was a polymath, philosopher, lawyer, natural scientist, theologian, Dominican and Bishop of Regensburg. His great, diverse knowledge earned him the name Magnus ("the Great"), the title of Doctor of the Church and the honorary title of doctor universalis.

Johann Joachim Winckelmann (1717–1768) was a German art historian and archaeologist, "the prophet and founding hero of modern archaeology". Heinrich Schliemann (1822–1890) was a wealthy businessman and a devotee of the historicity of places mentioned in the works of Homer and an archaeological excavator of Hisarlik (since 1871), now presumed to be the site of Troy, along with the Mycenaean sites Mycenae and Tiryns. Theodor Mommsen (1817–1903) is widely counted as one of the greatest classicists of the 19th century; his work regarding Roman history is still of fundamental importance for contemporary research. Max Weber (1864–1920) was together with Karl Marx (1818–1883) among the most important theorists of the development of modern Western society and is regarded as one of the founder of the Sociology.

Immanuel Kant (1724–1804) was a philosopher of the Enlightenment and professor of logic and metaphysics in Königsberg. Kant is one of the most important representatives of Western philosophy. His work Critique of Pure Reason marks a turning point in the history of philosophy and the beginning of modern philosophy. Kant is best known for the categorical imperative, the fundamental principle of moral action from his Groundwork of the Metaphysics of Morals: "Act only according to that maxim whereby you can at the same time will that it should become a universal law."

While Kant was one of the first philosopher of German idealism, Georg Wilhelm Friedrich Hegel (1770–1831) is one of the most influential and last representative of it. His philosophy seeks to interprete the whole of reality in its variety of manifestations, including historical development, in a coherent, systematic and definitive manner. It is divided into "logic", "natural philosophy" and "Phenomenology of Geist", which also includes a philosophy of history. His thinking also became the starting point for numerous other movements in the theory of science, sociology, history, theology, politics, jurisprudence and art theory, and it also influenced other areas of culture and intellectual life.

Contemporary examples are the philosopher Jürgen Habermas, the Egyptologist Jan Assmann, the sociologist Niklas Luhmann, the historian Reinhart Koselleck and the legal historian Michael Stolleis. In order to promote the international visibility of research in these fields a new prize, Geisteswissenschaften International, 'Humanities international', was established in 2008; it serves the translation of studies of humanities into English.

=== Warfare ===
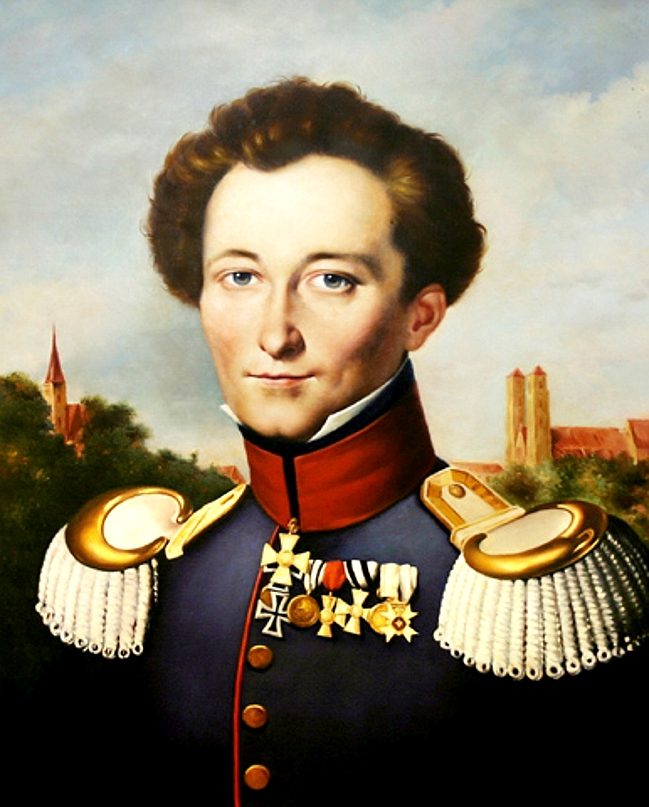
Carl von Clausewitz

Carl von Clausewitz (1780–1831) was a Prussian Generalmajor, army reformer, military scientist and ethicist. Clausewitz became known through his unfinished major work Vom Kriege, which deals with the problem of the theory of war. His theories on strategy, tactics and philosophy had a major influence on the military theory in all Western countries and are still taught at military academies until today. They are also used in business management and marketing. The most used quotation is the statement from his masterpiece: "War is the continuation of policy with other means."

Oswald Boelcke was the progenitor of air-to-air combat tactics, fighter squadron organization, early-warning systems, and the German air force; he has been dubbed "the father of air combat". From his first victories, the news of his success instructed and motivated both his fellow fliers and the German public. It was at his instigation that the Imperial German Air Service founded its Jastaschule (Fighter School) to teach his aerial tactics. The promulgation of his Dicta Boelcke set tactics for the German fighter force. The concentration of fighter airplanes into squadrons gained Germany air supremacy on the Western Front, and was the basis for their wartime successes.

== Personalities ==
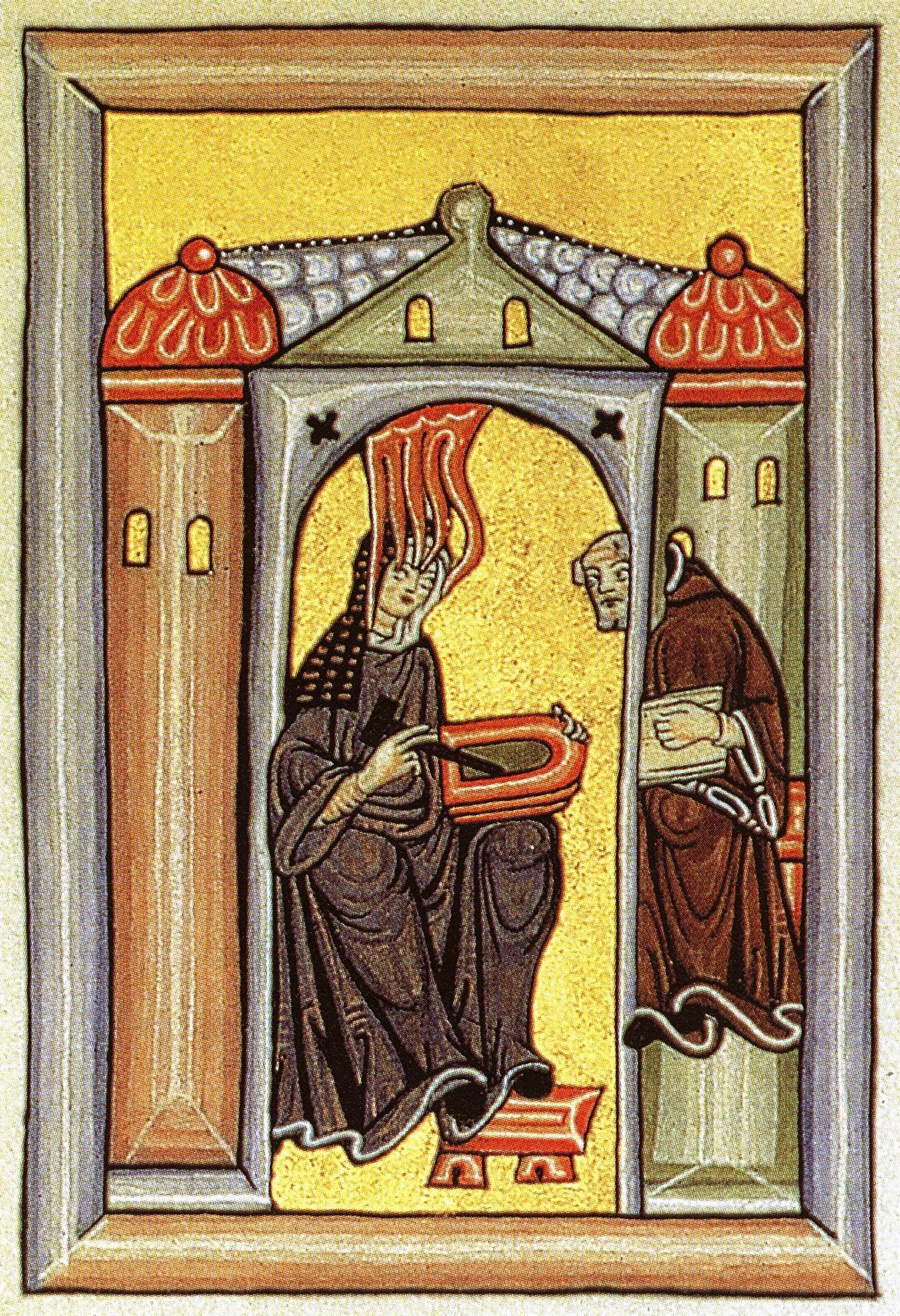
Hildegard of Bingen, considered by scholars to be the founder of scientific natural history in Germany.

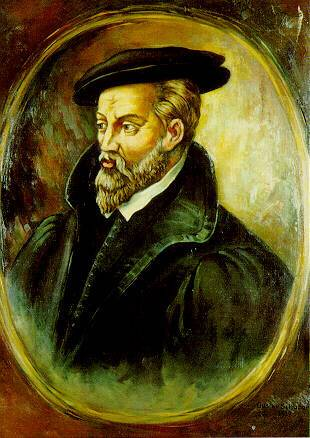
Georgius Agricola gave chemistry its modern name. Generally referred to as the father of mineralogy and the founder of geology as a scientific discipline.

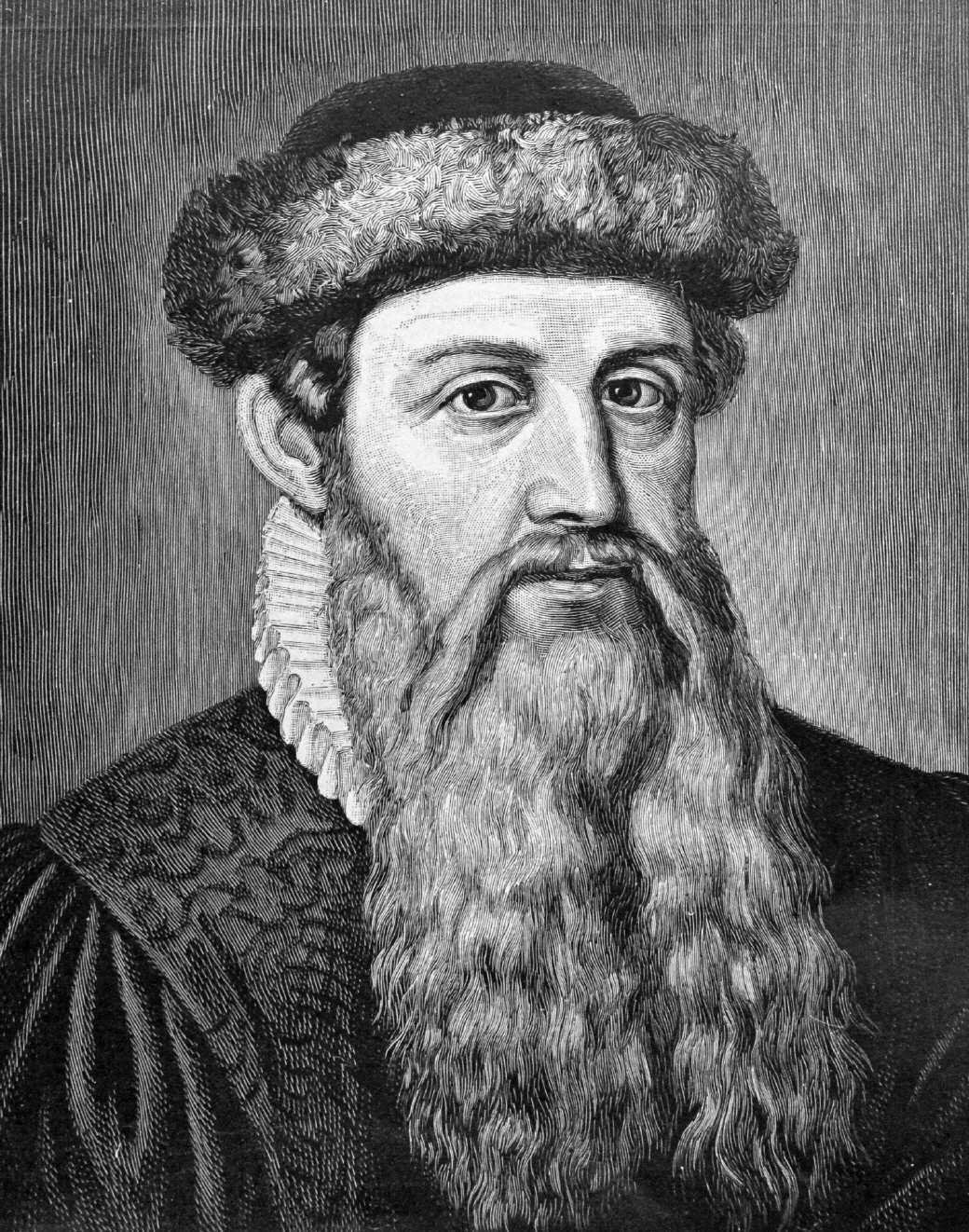
Johannes Gutenberg, inventor of the printing press, named the most important invention of the second millennium.

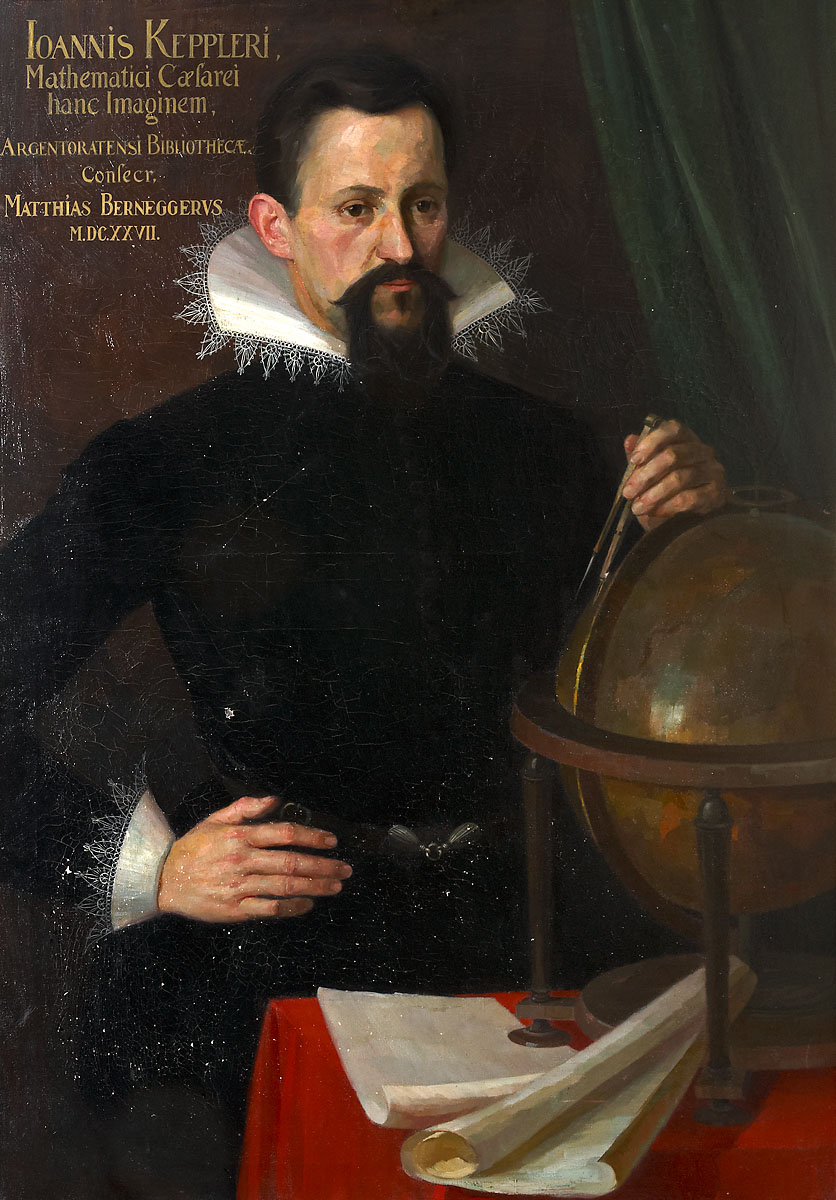
Johannes Kepler, one of the founders and fathers of modern astronomy, the scientific method, natural and modern science.

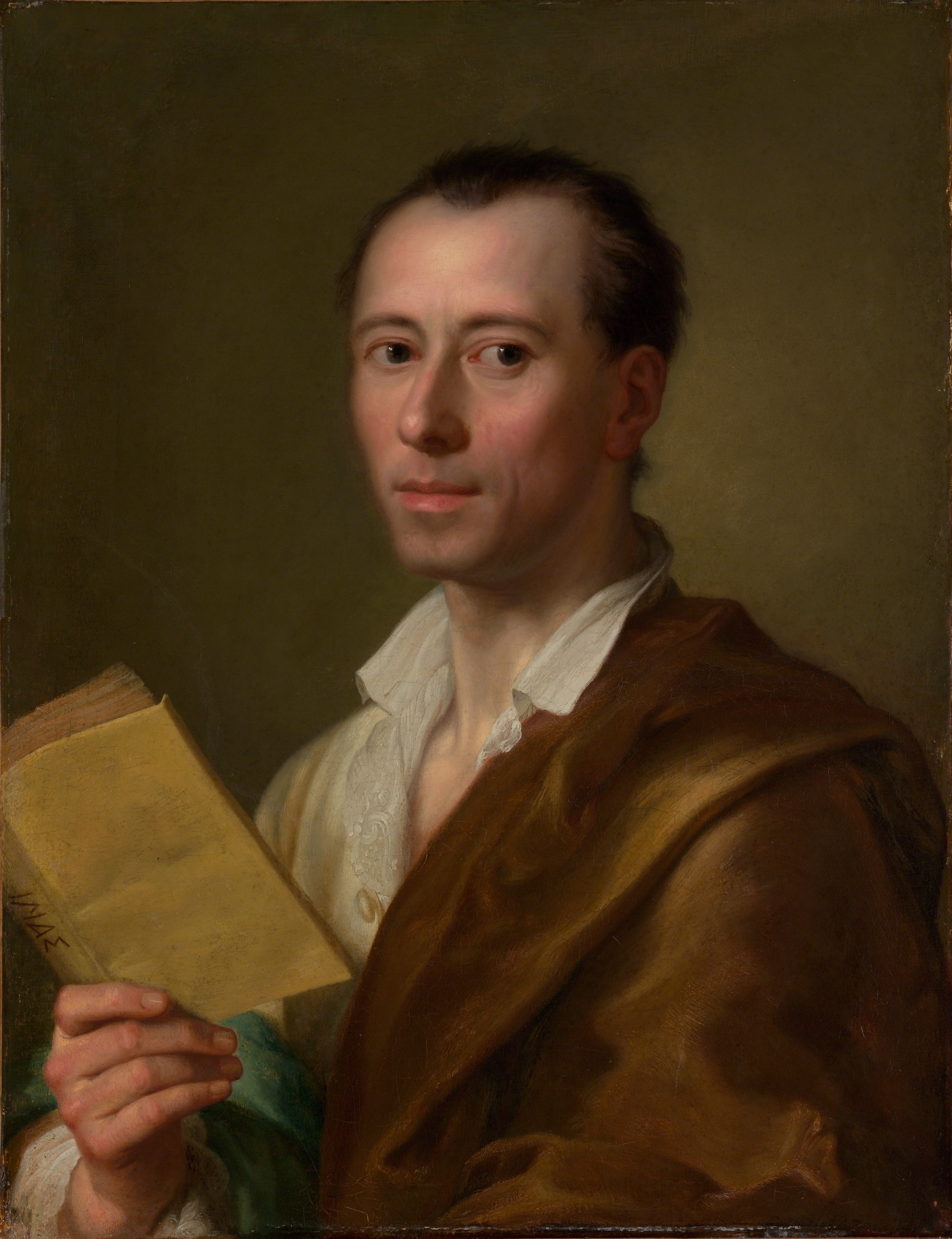
Johann Joachim Winckelmann, founder of modern archaeology, father of the discipline of art history and father of Neoclassicism.

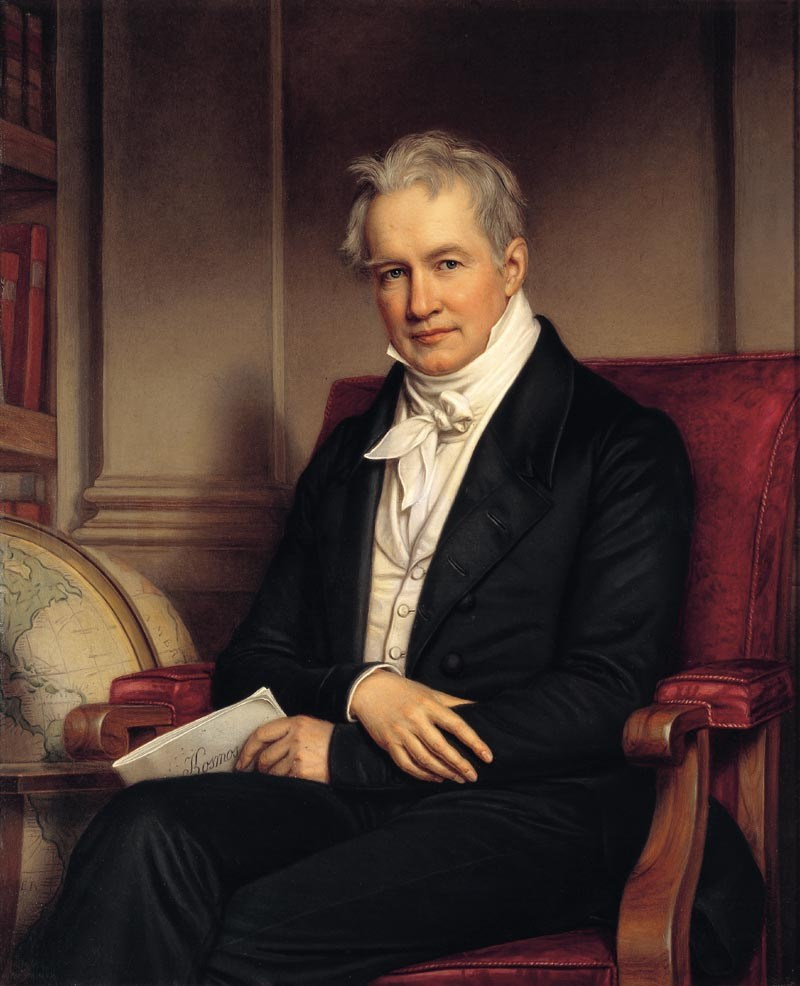
Alexander von Humboldt, seen as father of ecology and of environmentalism.

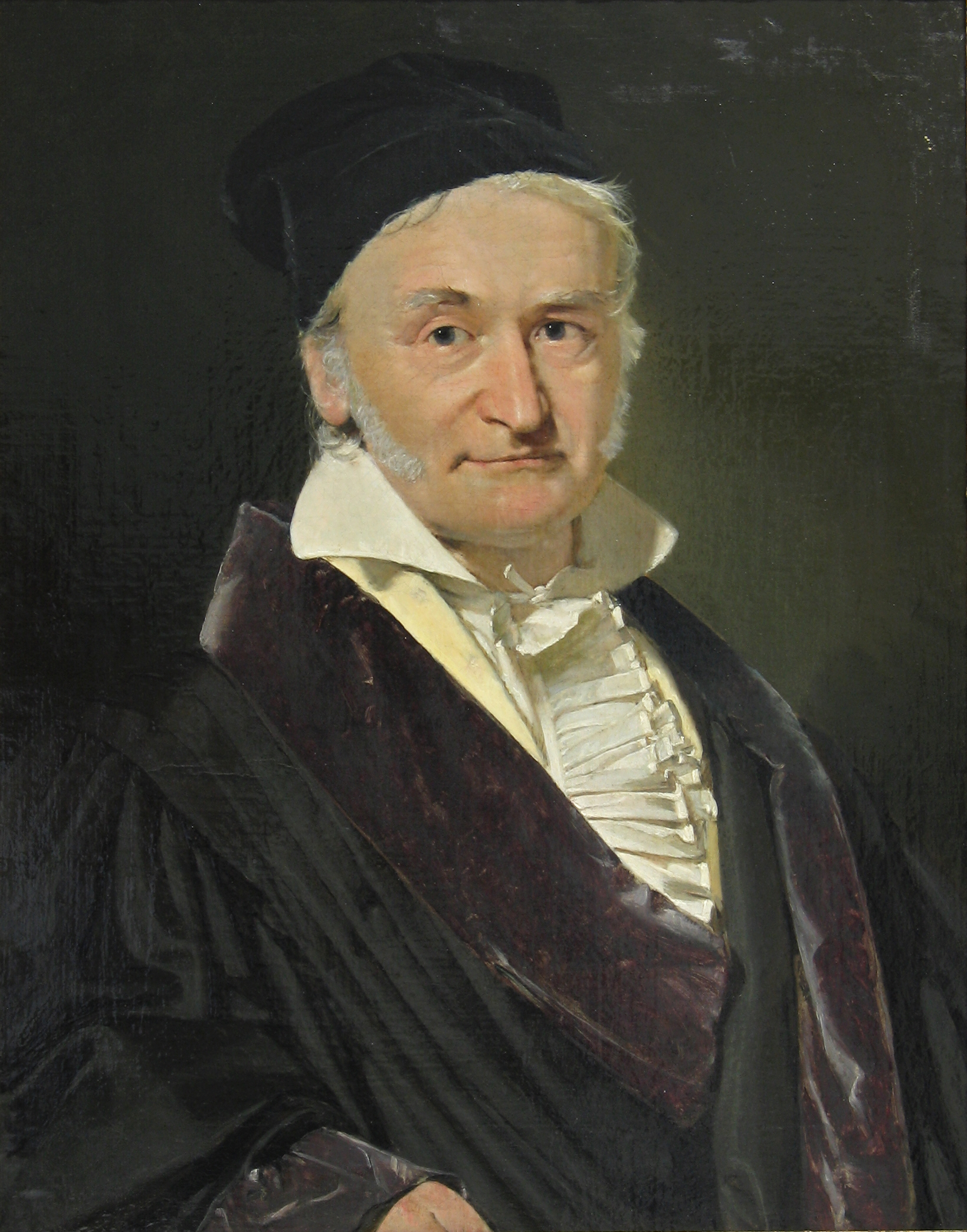
Carl Friedrich Gauss, referred to as one of the most important mathematicians of all time.

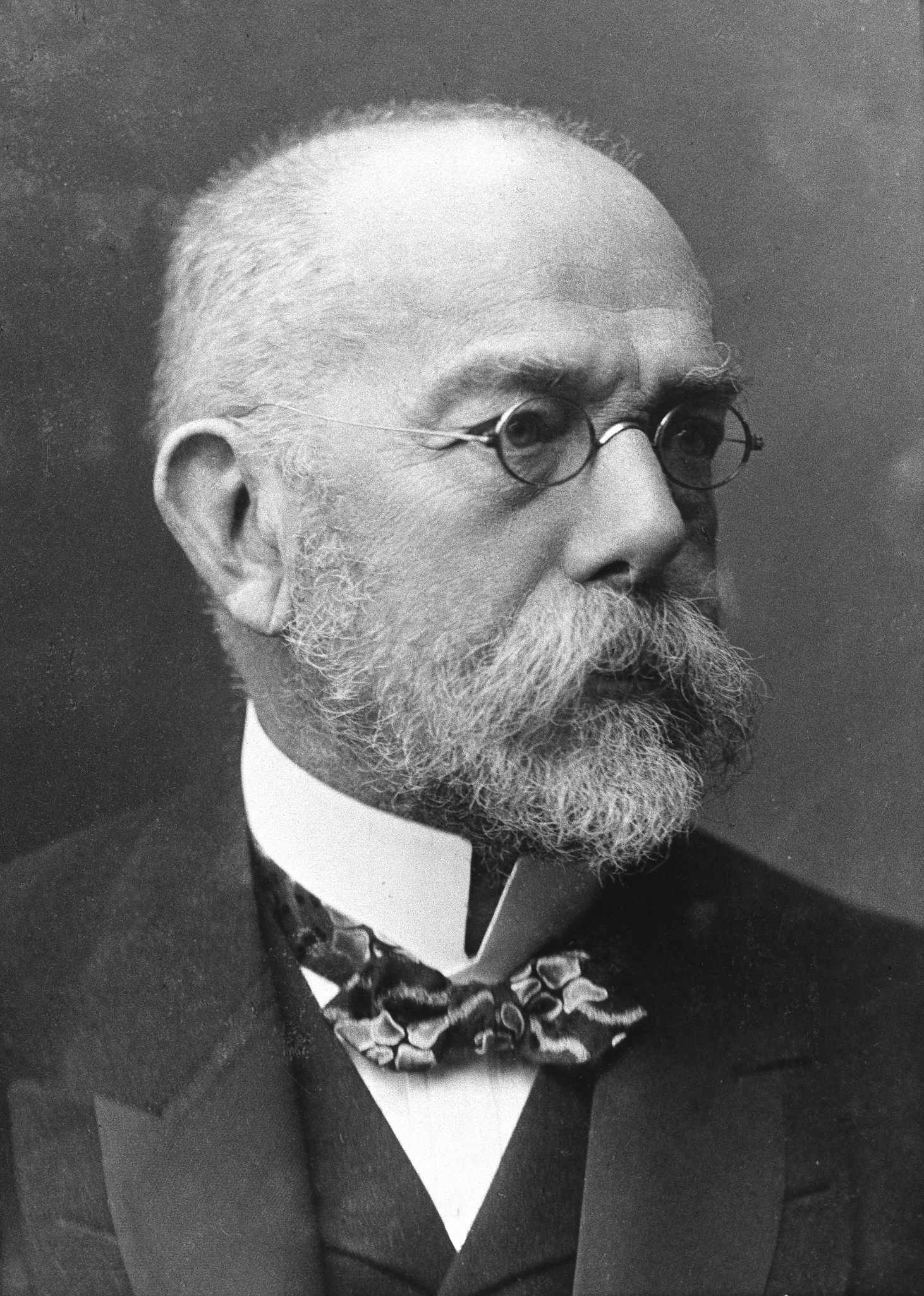
Robert Koch, one of the fathers of microbiology, medical bacteriology and one of the founders of modern medicine.

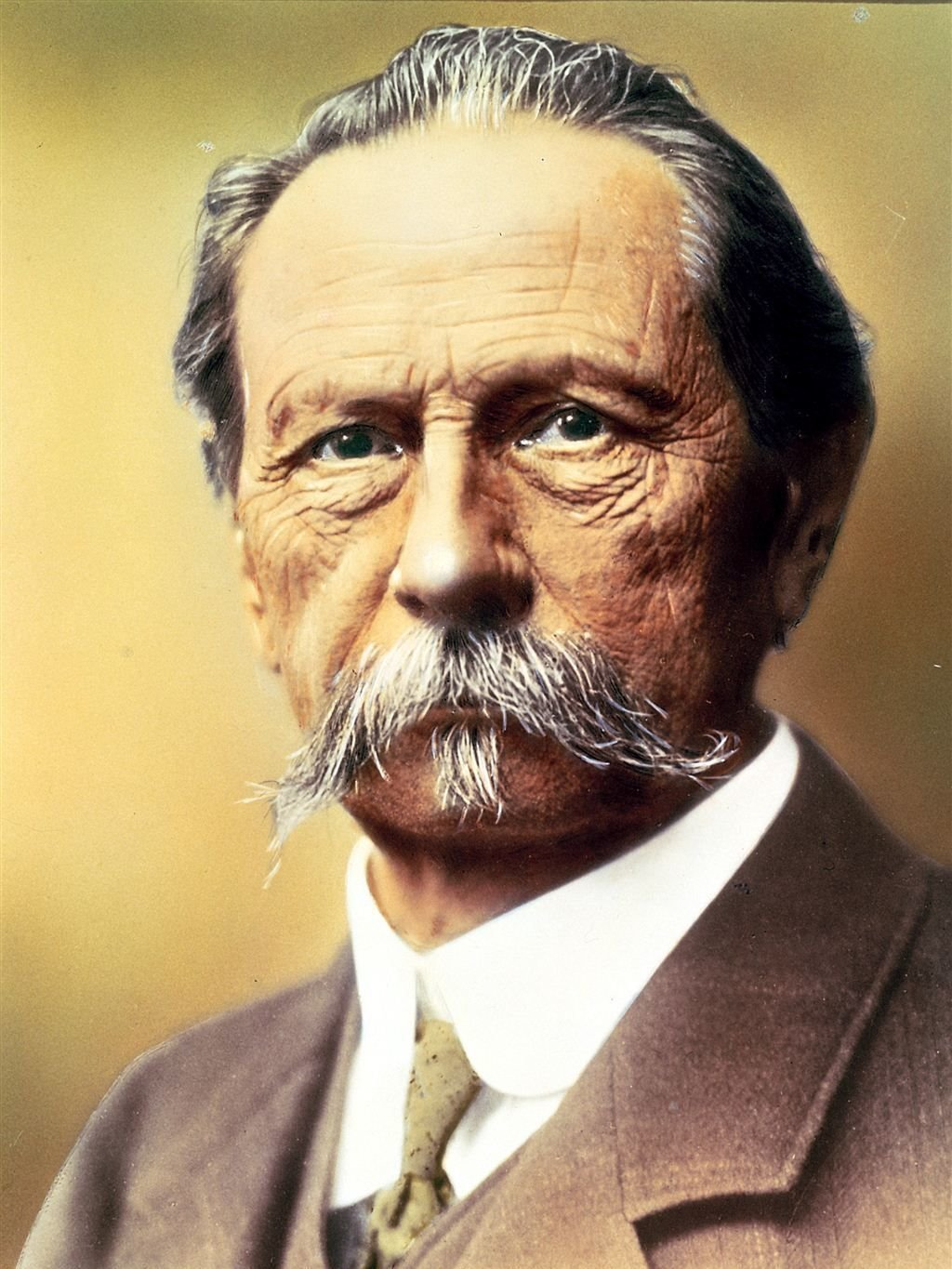
Carl Benz, inventor of the modern car and father of the automobile industry.

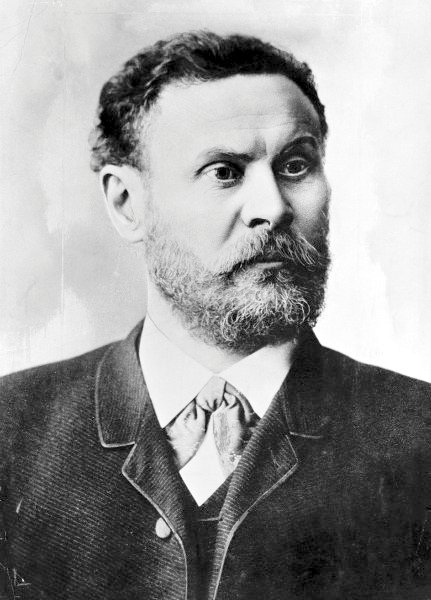
Otto Lilienthal, who has been referred to as the "father of aviation" or "father of flight".

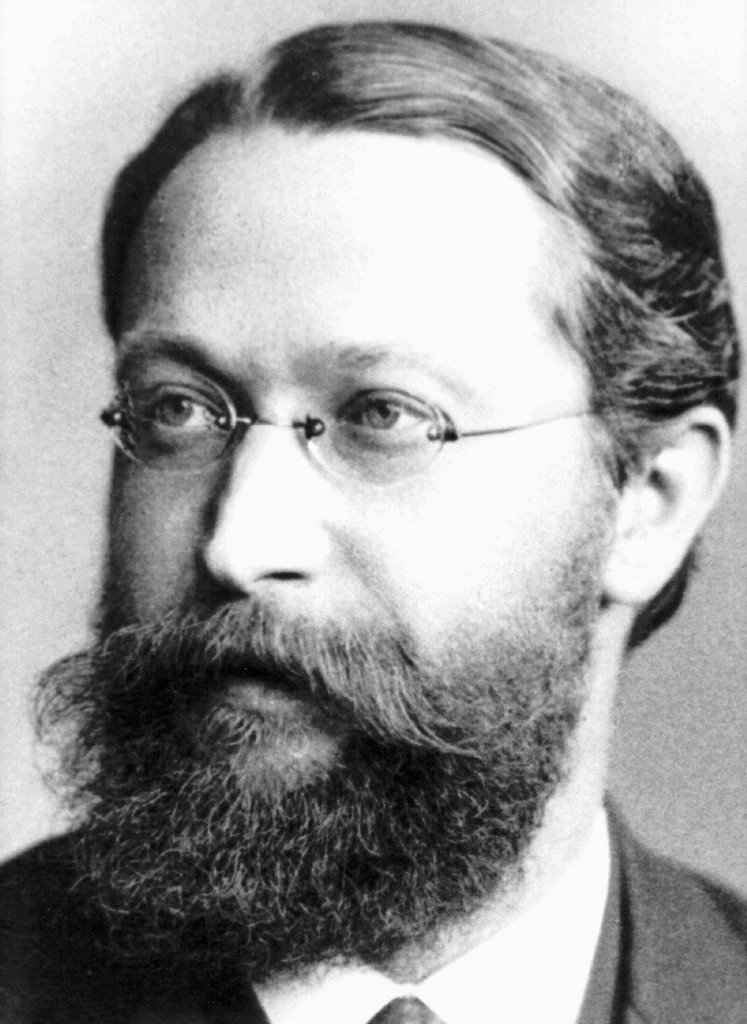
Karl Ferdinand Braun, who has been called one of the fathers of television, radio telegraphy and who built the first semiconductor, inaugurating the field of electronics.

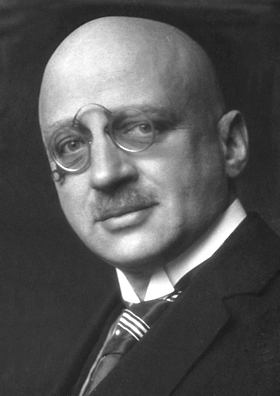
Fritz Haber invented the Haber–Bosch process. It is estimated that it provides the food production for nearly half of the world's population. Haber has been called one of the most important scientists and chemists in human history.

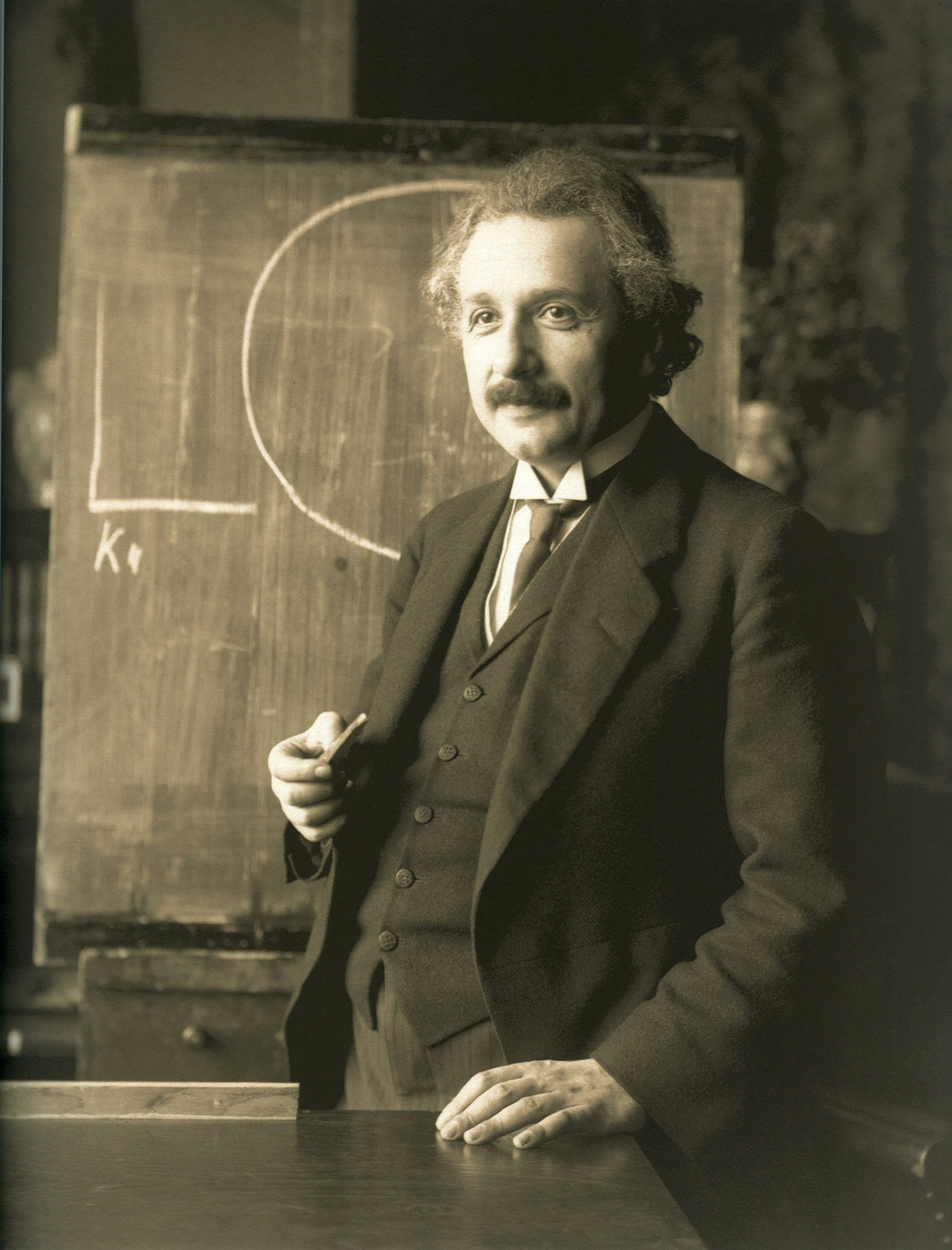
Albert Einstein, who has been called the greatest physicist of all time and one of the fathers of modern physics.

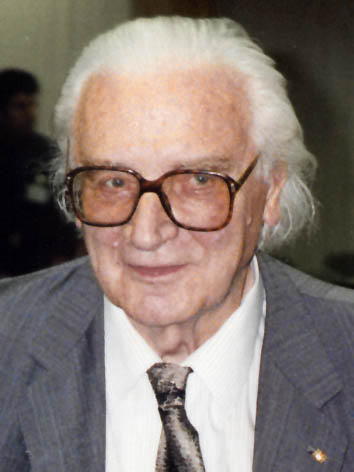
Konrad Zuse, inventor of the modern computer.

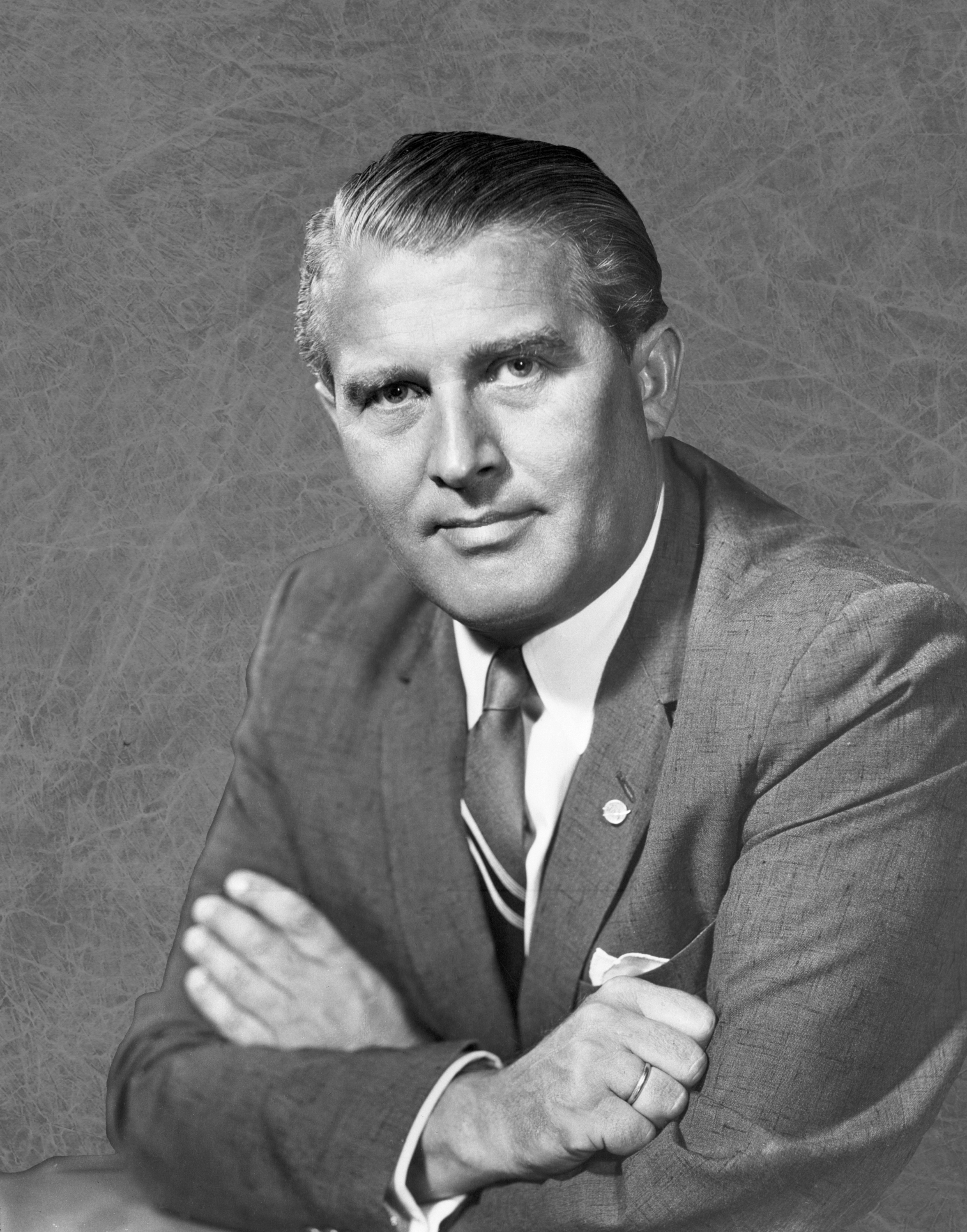
Wernher von Braun, who co-developed the V-2 rocket, the first artificial object to travel into space. Described by others as the "father of space travel", the "father of rocket science", or the "father of the American lunar program".

== Nobel Prizes ==
1. Benjamin List, Chemistry, 2021
2. Klaus Hasselmann, Physics, 2021
3. Reinhard Genzel, Physics, 2020
4. Joachim Frank, Chemistry, 2017
5. Thomas C. Südhof, Physiology or Medicine, 2013
6. Harald zur Hausen, Physiology or Medicine, 2008
7. Gerhard Ertl, Chemistry, 2007
8. Peter Grünberg, Physics, 2007
9. Theodor W. Hänsch, Physics, 2005
10. Wolfgang Ketterle, Physics, 2001
11. Herbert Kroemer, Physics, 2000
12. Günter Blobel, Physiology or Medicine, 1999
13. Horst L. Störmer, Physics, 1998
14. Christiane Nüsslein-Volhard, Physiology or Medicine, 1995
15. Reinhard Selten, Economics, 1994
16. Bert Sakmann, Physiology or Medicine, 1991
17. Erwin Neher, Physiology or Medicine, 1991
18. Hans G. Dehmelt, Physics, 1989
19. Wolfgang Paul, Physics, 1989
20. Johann Deisenhofer, Chemistry, 1988
21. Robert Huber, Chemistry, 1988
22. Hartmut Michel, Chemistry, 1988
23. J. Georg Bednorz, Physics, 1987
24. Ernst Ruska, Physics, 1986
25. Gerd Binnig, Physics, 1986
26. Klaus von Klitzing, Physics, 1985
27. Georges J.F. Köhler, Physiology or Medicine, 1984
28. Georg Wittig, Chemistry, 1979
29. Ernst Otto Fischer, Chemistry, 1973
30. Karl von Frisch, Physiology or Medicine, 1973
31. Max Delbrück, Physiology or Medicine, 1969
32. Manfred Eigen, Chemistry, 1967
33. Feodor Felix Konrad Lynen, Physiology or Medicine, 1964
34. Karl Ziegler, Chemistry, 1963
35. Maria Goeppert-Mayer, Physics, 1963
36. J. Hans D. Jensen, Physics, 1963
37. Rudolf Mössbauer, Physics, 1961
38. Werner Forssmann, Physiology or Medicine, 1956
39. Polykarp Kusch, Physics, 1955
40. Max Born, Physics, 1954
41. Walther Bothe, Physics, 1954
42. Hermann Staudinger, Chemistry, 1953
43. Fritz Albert Lipmann, Physiology or Medicine, 1953
44. Hans Adolf Krebs, Physiology or Medicine, 1953
45. Albert Schweitzer, Peace, 1952
46. Otto Diels, Chemistry, 1950
47. Kurt Alder, Chemistry, 1950
48. Otto Hahn, Chemistry, 1944
49. Adolf Butenandt, Chemistry, 1939
50. Gerhard Domagk, Physiology or Medicine, 1939
51. Richard Kuhn, Chemistry, 1938
52. Hans Spemann, Physiology or Medicine, 1935
53. Werner Karl Heisenberg, Physics, 1932
54. Otto Heinrich Warburg, Physiology or Medicine, 1931
55. Carl Bosch, Chemistry, 1931
56. Friedrich Bergius, Chemistry, 1931
57. Hans Fischer, Chemistry, 1930
58. Adolf Otto Reinhold Windaus, Chemistry, 1928
59. Heinrich Otto Wieland, Chemistry, 1927
60. Gustav Ludwig Hertz, Physics, 1925
61. Otto Fritz Meyerhof, Physiology or Medicine, 1922
62. Walther Nernst, Chemistry, 1920
63. Johannes Stark, Physics, 1919
64. Fritz Haber, Chemistry, 1918
65. Max Planck, Physics, 1918
66. Richard Willstätter, Chemistry, 1915
67. Max von Laue, Physics, 1914
68. Wilhelm Wien, Physics, 1911
69. Otto Wallach, Chemistry, 1910
70. Albrecht Kossel, Physiology or Medicine, 1910
71. Karl Ferdinand Braun, Physics, 1909
72. Wilhelm Ostwald, Chemistry, 1909
73. Paul Ehrlich, Physiology or Medicine, 1908
74. Eduard Buchner, Chemistry, 1907
75. Robert Koch, Physiology or Medicine, 1905
76. Philipp Lenard, Physics, 1905
77. Adolf von Baeyer, Chemistry, 1905
78. Hermann Emil Fischer, Chemistry, 1902
79. Theodor Mommsen, Literature, 1902
80. Emil Adolf von Behring, Physiology or Medicine, 1901
81. Wilhelm Conrad Röntgen, Physics, 1901

== See also ==
- Körber European Science Prize
- List of German inventions and discoveries
- List of German inventors and discoverers
- List of German mathematicians
- List of German scientists by century
- List of German states by research and development spending
- Operation Paperclip
- Technology during World War II
