= Baden-Württemberg–Bavaria rivalry =

Regional rivalry between two German federal states

Map of Germany highlighting Bavaria

Map of Germany highlighting Baden-Württemberg

The rivalry between the German federal states of Bavaria and Baden-Württemberg, the nation's second- and third-most populous states behind North Rhine-Westphalia, respectively, is a rhetorical rivalry especially regarding their economies and cultures.

Bavaria is typically considered to be a very proud state, known for its "Mia-san-mia" (Bavarian for Wir sind wir; English: We are [who] we [are]) motto, which would represent their confident mentality and attitude, while Baden-Württemberg is usually portrayed as a rather modest state. Politically, both states have long been center-right CDU/CSU strongholds, though in Baden-Württemberg, the Greens have significantly gained ground since the 2010s. While Baden-Württemberg is seen as the cradle of German liberalism, Bavaria is rather traditional and conservative.

== Culture ==
Overall, Bavaria is more culturally popular and influential than Baden-Württemberg. Its culture has become synonymous with Germany in the eyes of many people around the world, and Bavarian traditions and festivals, such as the Oktoberfest, are celebrated worldwide. A popular festival of Baden-Württemberg, although not nearly as popular and famous as the Oktoberfest, is the Cannstatter Volksfest, the second-largest Volksfest after the Oktoberfest.

Bavaria is popular for its football club FC Bayern München, whereas Baden-Württemberg is known for the VfB Stuttgart. Both states are famous motorsport sites, with Bavaria being famous for the Norisring and Baden-Württemberg for its Hockenheimring.

Bavaria is famous for its beer gardens and Bavarian cuisine, which includes traditional food such as schnitzel, sausages, and pretzels. In Baden-Württemberg, the Swabian cuisine is widespread, which is known for dishes such as maultaschen, schupfnudeln and spätzle. Baden-Württemberg is also known for its wine regions, such as Württemberg and Baden.

The state capital cities of Munich and Stuttgart are also their most populous cities and are both vibrant cities in Germany, with each having a significant amount of city culture. Munich has a thriving theater and opera scene, and is home to numerous art galleries and museums, such as the Pinakothek der Moderne and the Deutsches Museum, the world's largest museum of science and technology. Stuttgart is also home to several cultural institutions, such as the Staatsgalerie Stuttgart, the Stuttgart Ballet, and the Landesmuseum Württemberg.

== Economy ==
Once a relatively poor region based primarily on agriculture, Southern Germany became the country's foremost economic powerhouse and most prosperous area following the Wirtschaftswunder.

According to a study from the German Economic Institute, Bavaria has the strongest economy of any German state, closely followed by Baden-Württemberg. After North Rhine-Westphalia, by far the most populous state of Germany, Bavaria and Baden-Württemberg have the second and third highest gross regional product (GRP) and the second and third highest number of billionaires, respectively.

Bavaria is home to a number of major global companies, including Siemens, Adidas, and Allianz. The state has Germany's lowest unemployment rate, third-highest exports, third-highest imports (2022), second-highest total research and development expenditure, and third-largest GDP per capita.

Baden-Württemberg is also home to many large and famous companies, such as Bosch, Schwarz Gruppe and SAP. The state has the second-lowest unemployment rate, highest exports and second-highest imports (2022), highest absolute and relative research and development expenditure, as well as the fourth-largest GDP per capita of any German state. In addition, with an industrial revenue of 309 billion euros and 32.5% of its GRP coming from the industrial sector (both figures as of 2013), Baden-Württemberg is the most industrialized German state both in absolute and relative terms, with the highest industrial output.

Baden-Württemberg has 277 world market-leading companies compared to Bavaria's 211, as well as 14,813 patent registrations versus Bavaria's 12,969, making it the German state with the most patents pending per capita (2020). It also has the second-highest absolute and highest relative number of companies considered "hidden champions". Therefore, Baden-Württemberg is considered the most innovative state of Germany, followed by Bavaria. A 2023 study by the German Economic Institute based on various metrics such as company establishments, R&D spending and patent applications found Baden-Württemberg to be the third-most innovative region in the world, behind California and Massachusetts, with Bavaria ranking seventh worldwide and second in Germany.

Both Bavaria and Baden-Württemberg have a highly developed automotive industry, with Bavaria housing the headquarters of BMW and Audi, and Baden-Württemberg having Mercedes-Benz and Porsche. However, Baden-Württemberg has a larger automotive industry; despite having a lower population, Baden-Württemberg has more workers employed in the automotive industry (240,000 vs 180,000) and more businesses operating in this industry (285 vs 240). In addition, Stuttgart, Baden-Württemberg's capital and most populous city, is often called Germany's "Autohauptstadt" ("car capital city"). It is also home to famous automobile museums like the Mercedes-Benz Museum and Porsche Museum, as well as numerous auto-enthusiast magazines.

Both Munich and Stuttgart are leading fintech centres in Germany, with Munich being home to the Munich Stock Exchange and the Bayerische Landesbank, and Stuttgart housing the Stuttgart Stock Exchange and the Landesbank Baden-Württemberg. Bavaria and Baden-Württemberg are also leading regions in the arms and aerospace industries.

Furthermore, the two states are the most popular tourist destinations in Germany, with Bavaria ranking first and Baden-Württemberg second by the total number of overnight stays of visitors. The Black Forest, Hohenzollern Castle, and Lake Constance are among the most famous tourist destinations of Baden-Württemberg, while Bavaria is known for the Zugspitze, Neuschwanstein Castle, and Königssee. In addition, Baden-Württemberg's Europa-Park and Bavaria's Legoland Deutschland are both major theme and amusement parks.

== See also ==
- California–Texas rivalry
- Cologne–Düsseldorf rivalry
