= Gerhard Fels =

German political economist (1939–2025)

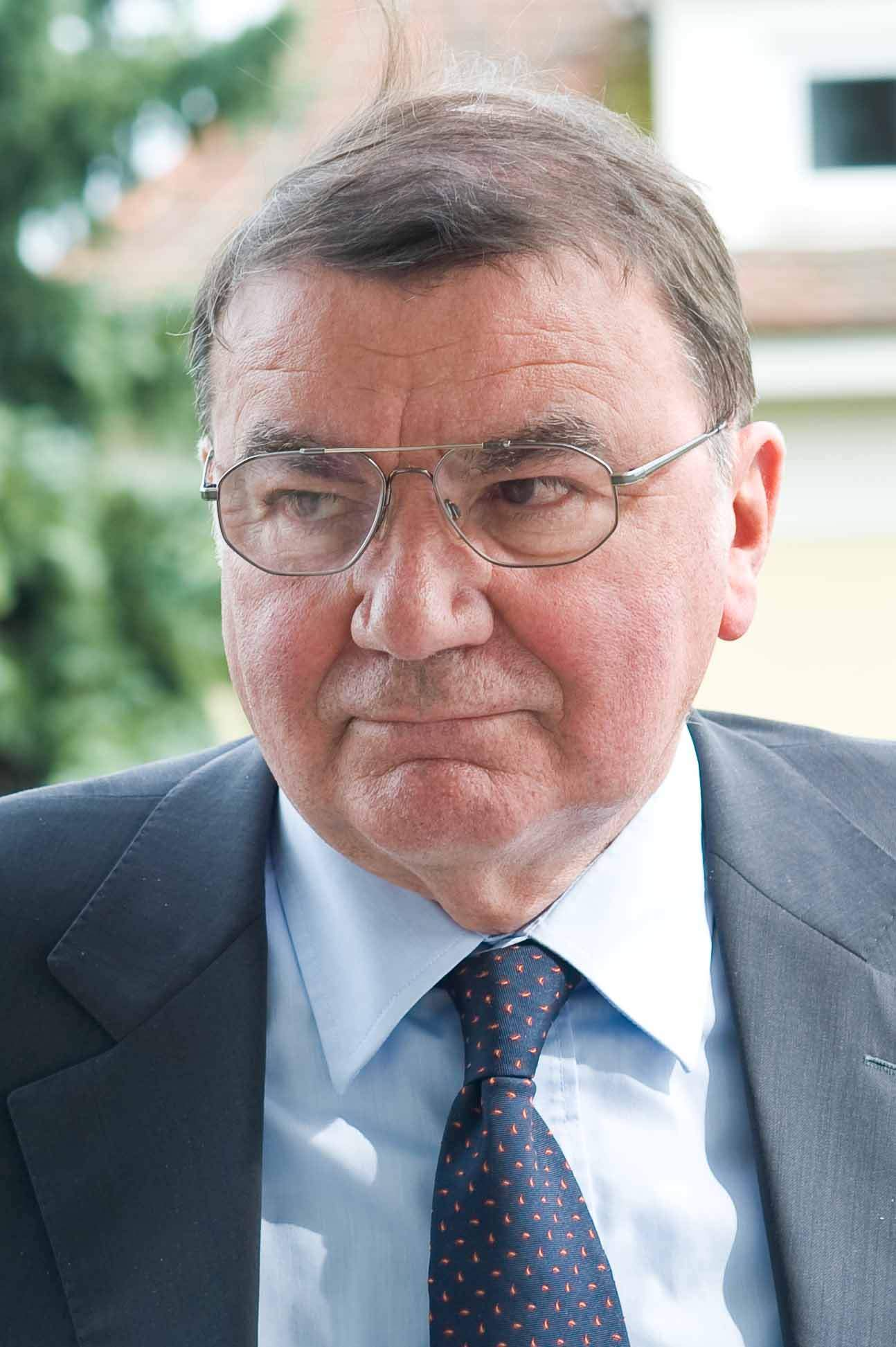
- Fels in 2007
- Born: 17 June 1939; Baumholder, Gau Koblenz-Trier, Germany
- Died: 16 July 2025 (aged 86)
- Education: Saarland University
- Occupation: Political economist
- Employer(s): Kiel University; University of Cologne

Gerhard Karl Fels (17 June 1939 – 16 July 2025) was a German political economist. He was a co-author and prominent representative of the supply-side theory turn in Germany, was one of the Five Wise Men in the Council of Economic Experts from 1976 to 1982, and director of the German Economic Institute in Cologne from 1983 to 2004.

== Early life and education ==
Gerhard Fels was the son of the farmer and sawmill owner Karl Fels and the seamstress and housewife Frieda Fels from Baumholder/Birkenfeld district (Rhineland-Palatinate). His father's family originated from Baumholder (Rhineland-Palatinate), and his mother, Frieda, was a daughter of Wilhelm and Charlotte Schug from Baumholder. Fels attended the Göttenbach-Gymnasium in Idar-Oberstein. After graduating from high school in the spring of 1959, he served in the Bundeswehr for one and a half years and was discharged with the rank of lieutenant in the reserves. In the fall of 1960, he began studying economics, first at the University of Bonn, then at the University of Saarland; his diploma thesis for Diplom-Volkswirt (1965 under Egon Sohmen) dealt with the theory of factor price equalization in international trade. Under Fels's academic and later professional mentor Herbert Giersch, he received his Dr. rer. pol. in 1969 in Saarbrücken with a dissertation The International Price Relationship. (Doctorate in Economics and Social Sciences).

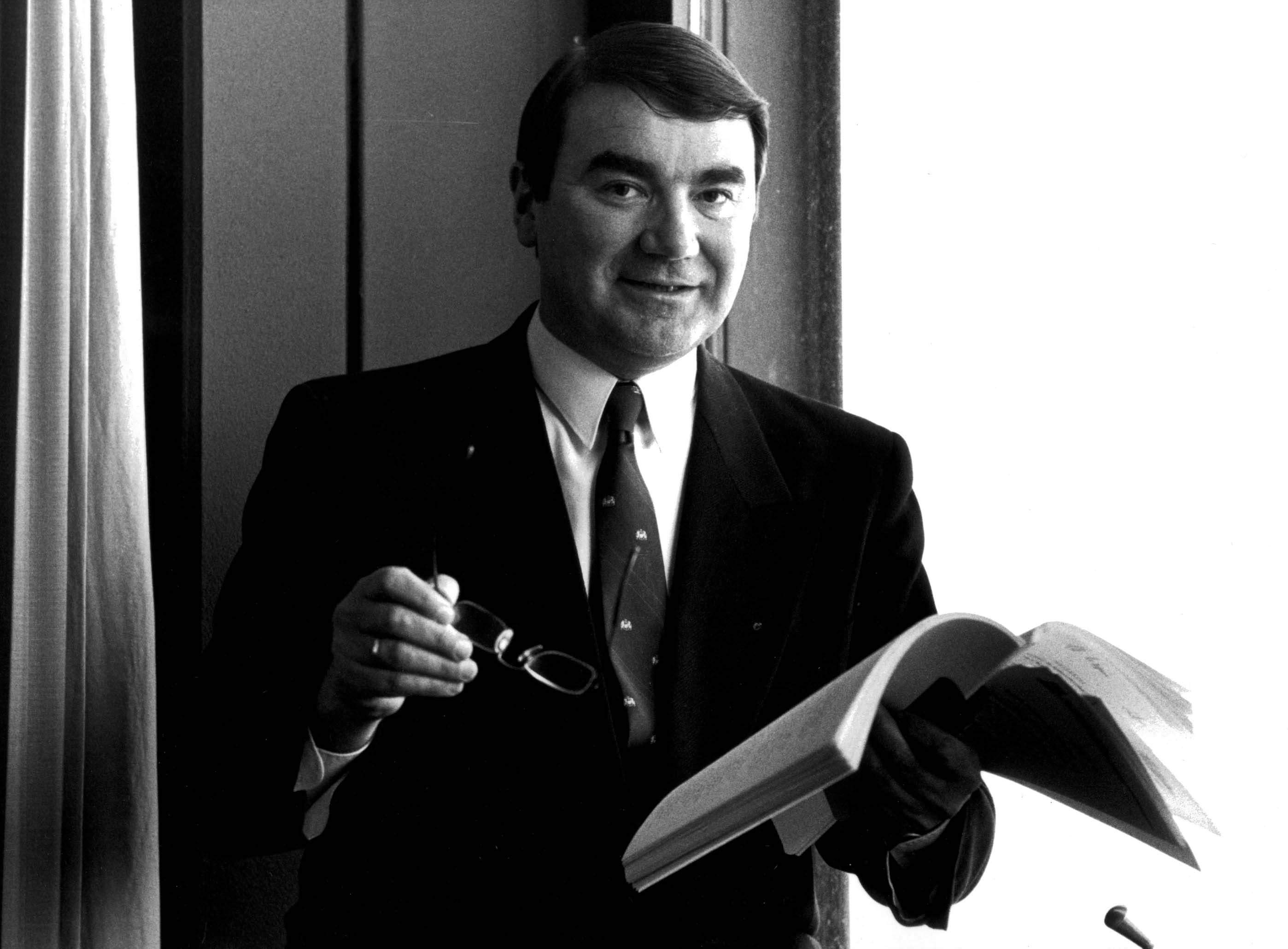
Gerhard Fels reads from the 1976 report on overall economic development, which called for the first time for a supply-side economic policy.

== Professional career ==
From 1964 to 1969, Fels was a research associate on the staff of the Council of Economic Experts (SVR), which had been established in 1963. From 1966 onwards, he worked there for three to four months a year directly preparing the annual report; the rest of the time, he was an assistant to Giersch at the Saarbrücken Institute for European Economic Policy.

=== Kiel years ===
In mid-1969, his teacher Giersch took over as president of the Institute for the World Economy (IfW), which is part of the University of Kiel. Fels followed him, along with other liberal economists from Saarbrücken. In 1971, he took over as head of the Department of Structure and World Economy there and was appointed deputy president of the institute in 1976. In addition to his work at the IfW, Fels taught as an Honorary Professor at the University of Kiel from 1974 to 1985. As one of only a few economists from Germany, Fels also gained international recognition. From 1978 to 1982, Fels was sent by the Development Ministry as the first German representative to the United Nations Committee for Development Planning (New York), a panel of 24 experts tasked with alerting the various UN agencies to weaknesses in the global economy. Since 1981, he was a member of the scientific directorate of the Research Institute of the German Council on Foreign Relations.

=== Council of Economic Experts ===
In June 1976, at the age of 37, Fels was appointed to the SVR as successor to Norbert Kloten as representative of the major economic research institutes., where he played a key role in formulating the supply-side policy concept of the Council of Five Wise Men – together with Armin Gutowski, Gerhard Scherhorn, Kurt Schmidt (financial expert), Olaf Sievert. The 1976 Annual Report, which became widely known for this reason, advocated a radical change in economic policy. The focus should no longer be on controlling aggregate demand, but rather on the supply side, i.e., the conditions for investment, research and development, innovation, and qualification. The report was also based on the Kiel research findings on economic structural change. The term "Germany as a business location" appeared for the first time, an abbreviation for the problem area of supply-side policy. The oil crisis, the rise in oil prices, the appreciation of the Deutsche Mark, and increasing imports from new emerging markets had made the structure of the German economy in need of renewal. Added to this was a growing national debt due to economic stimulus programs.

While in Germany, broad academic circles and politicians were initially critical of the new concept, the "revolution" took place abroad. In the United Kingdom, Margaret Thatcher and in the United States, Ronald Reagan initiated a new economic policy based on related concepts, which in the USA was expressed under the new term "supply-side economics." There is no evidence that the Americans had noticed what the SVR had developed in four annual reports as supply-side economics. The attention that Thatcherism and Reagan's new economic policy received worldwide brought the older ideas of the Council of Economic Experts into full focus in Germany in the early 1980s. Milestones of the subsequent rethinking in Germany included, for example, the Lambsdorff Paper, the change of government in 1982, and the consolidation course of the then Federal Finance Minister Gerhard Stoltenberg.

At the end of February 1982, Fels resigned from the Council of Economic Experts, although the federal government sought to keep him on the committee.

=== Institute of the German Economy in Cologne ===
In 1983, Gerhard Fels took over from Burghard Freundenfeld as director and member of the executive board of the Institut der deutschen Wirtschaft (IW) in Cologne. Under Fels's 21 years of leadership, the institute, financed by major companies and associations, earned a reputation for scientific independence. The focus of research and publications was always on the topic of location in all its dimensions. Fels placed great emphasis on studies with a solid theoretical foundation and a precise empirical basis. After the reunification of Germany, Fels was directly or indirectly involved in various positions in the transformation process of the decrepit socialist system into a functioning market economy. Among other things, he became a member of an advisory board to the last GDR Prime Minister, Lothar de Maizière, who also sought West German advice during the negotiations of the State Treaty that led to the introduction of the Deutsche Mark. Parallel to his work at the institute, Fels received an honorary professorship at the University of Cologne in 1983, where he focused on teaching international economic relations. In 1988, he was appointed to the renowned Group of Thirty in Washington, D.C., and from 1991 to 1999 he was a member of the advisory board of the German Institute for Japanese Studies in Tokyo, and from 1995 he was chairman. On 1 July 2004, he handed over his position as Director of the German Economic Institute to Michael Hüther. To mark Fels's retirement, the IfW hosted a scientific symposium on supply-side economic policy in Cologne on 22 June, including a lecture by the President of the European Central Bank, Jean-Claude Trichet.

== Economic Policy Positions (Excerpt) ==
In the almost three decades in which Fels was a constant advocate for strengthening Germany's competitiveness as a business location, many of his individual positions stimulated public debate. He was a staunch opponent of a demand-oriented economic policy. In 1997, for example, he decisively rejected the so-called Zwickel initiative for further reductions in working hours. In 1998, he became known as a critic of the economic policy stance of Chancellor candidate Schröder. In 2002, Fels positioned himself as an opponent of the Mainz Model of the Schröder government. Also in 2002, he called for the abolition of the Shop Closing Time Act. And in 2003, he stimulated the public discussion about the "... tax wedge...", which "...has assumed scandalous proportions in Germany..."

== Personal life and death ==
In 1962, Gerhard Fels married Waltraut, née Endres (born 1940) in Baumholder. The couple had three children: Joachim Fels (born 1962), who works as a managing director at Pimco, Florian Fels (born 1967), and Katrin Huppert (née Fels, born 1970). On 16 July 2025, Gerhard Fels died at the age of 86.

== Functions (excerpt) ==
Gerhard Fels was a participant or member of the supervisory board or board of directors of various committees and institutions:

- Co-founder and member of the Kronberger Circle (1981–1983)
- Participant in the Bergedorf Discussion Group of the Körber Foundation
- Member of the Group of Thirty
- Curator and Ambassador of the Initiative New Social Market Economy (until 2004)
- Member of the board of trustees at the Max Planck Institute for the Study of Societies (until 2008)
- Chairman of the advisory board of the Herbert Giersch Foundation
- Member of the Board of the Association of Friends of the DIW Berlin (VdF) (until 2004)
- Advisory Board of the Klüh Foundation
- Supervisory Board of VHV VaG and Hannoversche Lebensversicherung AG
- Supervisory Board of Swiss Re Germany AG (until 2007)
- Presidential Council of Dekra e.V.
- Supervisory Board of Oppenheim KAG GmbH (until 2009)
- Advisory Board of Nestlé S.A. (until 2007)
- Member of the Ludwig Erhard Foundation

== Awards ==
- 1986: Bernhard Harms Medal from the Kiel Institute for the World Economy
- 1998: Federal Cross of Merit, 1st Class
- 2001: Ludwig Erhard Prize for Economic Journalism of the Ludwig Erhard Foundation

== Publications (excerpt) ==
- "The International Price Relationship. A Study on Inflation Imports in the Federal Republic of Germany." Dissertation. Heymann, Cologne [et al.] 1969
- with Bernhard Gahlen: "Prosperity and Stability with Limited Growth." Volume 1. Walter Raymond Foundation, Cologne 1976, ISBN 3-7616-0306-1
- ""Wir stehen jetzt hinter der Theke"", Der Spiegel, 21 July, 23 January 1977
- with Klaus-Dieter Schmidt: "The German Economy in Structural Change." Mohr, Tübingen 1980, ISBN 3-16-343981-0
- ""Wir können in eine Depression hineingeraten"", Der Spiegel, 21 July, 13 February 1983
- with Wolfram Engels, Armin Gutowski, Wolfgang Stützel, Carl Christian von Weizsäcker & Hans Willgerodt: Proposals for a "Minor Tax Reform." Stiftung Marktwirtschaft, 1983, ISBN 3-89015-001-2
- with Achim Seffen & Otto Vogel (eds.): Social Security. From the Financial Crisis to Structural Reform. Deutscher Instituts-Verlag, Cologne 1984, ISBN 3-602-34843-1
- with Winfried Schlaffke (eds.): Church and Business in Responsibility for the Problems of Our Time. Deutscher Instituts-Verlag, Cologne 1984, ISBN 3-602-34839-3
- In the Tropic of Cancer. Treatise on Politics and Economics. Informedia Verlag, Cologne 1985, ISBN 3-921349-44-3
- More Flexibility in the Labor Market. Kiel Institute for the World Economy, 1986, ISBN 3-925357-37-8
- (ed.): Church and Business in Responsibility for the Future of the World Economy. Deutscher Instituts-Verlag, Cologne 1987, ISBN 3-602-34850-4
- with Otto Vogel (ed.): Do We Need a New Industrial Policy? Deutscher Instituts-Verlag, Cologne 1987, ISBN 3-602-34851-2
- with Otto Vogel (ed.): Corporate Taxation in the Federal Republic of Germany. Deutscher Instituts-Verlag, Cologne 1988, ISBN 3-602-14226-4
- with Horst Lemke & Gerhard W. Wittkämper: "Occupation and Labor Law in the EC Internal Market." Deutscher Instituts-Verlag, Cologne 1989, ISBN 3-602-24897-6
- with George M. von Furstenberg (ed.): "A Supply-Side Agenda for Germany. Sparks from the United States, Great Britain, European Integration." Springer, Berlin [et al.] 1989, ISBN 3-540-50544-X
- with Hans-Peter Fröhlich & Otto Vogel: "Socially Acceptable Design of the German-German Monetary Union. Expert Opinion." Deutscher Instituts-Verlag, Cologne 1990, ISBN 3-602-24001-0
- "Herbert Giersch." A lecture given at the invitation of the Society for the Promotion of the Kiel Institute for the World Economy on 25 June 1989. Mohr, Tübingen 1990, ISBN 3-16-145638-6
- (ed.): "Landmarks for the 1990s. Lectures and panel discussion at an IW forum on October 16, 1989, in Bonn-Bad Godesberg." Deutscher Instituts-Verlag, Cologne 1990, ISBN 3-602-14269-8
- "Dead End or Silver Lining." Theses on the New Economic World. Informedia Verlag, Cologne 1992, ISBN 3-921349-56-7
- (ed.): "Location Germany. After Unification – Before the Single Market." Deutscher Instituts-Verlag, Cologne 1992, ISBN 3-602-34858-X
- (ed.): "Location Factor: Freedom of Movement." Deutscher Instituts-Verlag, Cologne 1993, ISBN 3-602-14338-4
- with Winfried Schlaffke (ed.): "Location Germany: Education." Shortage of skilled workers – abundance of academics. Deutscher Instituts-Verlag, Cologne 1993, ISBN 3-602-14340-6
- with Winfried Schlaffke (ed.): "The Market Economy and Its Social Components." Deutscher Instituts-Verlag, Cologne 1993, ISBN 3-602-34861-X
- with Werner Dichmann (ed.): "Social and Economic Functions of Private Property." Deutscher Instituts-Verlag, Cologne 1996, ISBN 3-602-34860-1
- (ed.): "The Welfare State in Transition." Deutscher Instituts-Verlag, Cologne 1997, ISBN 3-602-14432-1
- with Reinhold Weiss (ed.): "In a Nutshell: Education – Economy – Society as Reflected in Quotation." Deutscher Instituts-Verlag, Cologne 1999, ISBN 3-602-14492-5
- Europe as a Business Location. Sustainable in International Competition. Inter Nationes, Bonn 2000
- (ed.): The Service Economy – An Engine for Growth and Employment. Proceedings of the XIII. International Conference of Private Business Organizations. Deutscher Instituts-Verlag, Cologne 2000, ISBN 3-602-14521-2
- with Friedrich Merz: Labor and Capital. GDA, Society for Marketing and Service of German Employers, Berlin 2002, ISBN 3-936074-16-X

== Literature ==
- Supply-Side Economic Policy. Between Scientific Demand and Political Reality. Documentation of the Scientific Symposium on the Occasion of the Farewell of Professor Dr. Gerhard Fels on 22 June 2004, in Cologne. Deutscher Instituts-Verlag, Cologne 2004, ISBN 3-602-14631-6
