= Cologne–Düsseldorf rivalry =

Competitive relationship between two major cities in the Rhineland, Germany

The rivalry between Cologne and Düsseldorf, two major cities in the Rhineland, Germany, 40 kilometres (25 mi) apart on the Rhine, is now mostly on a sporting and cultural level, but based on historical and economic factors. Cologne was a Roman colony, and later a Free Imperial City, while Düsseldorf, a small medieval settlement, is now the capital of the state of North Rhine-Westphalia.

== History ==
=== Battle of Worringen ===
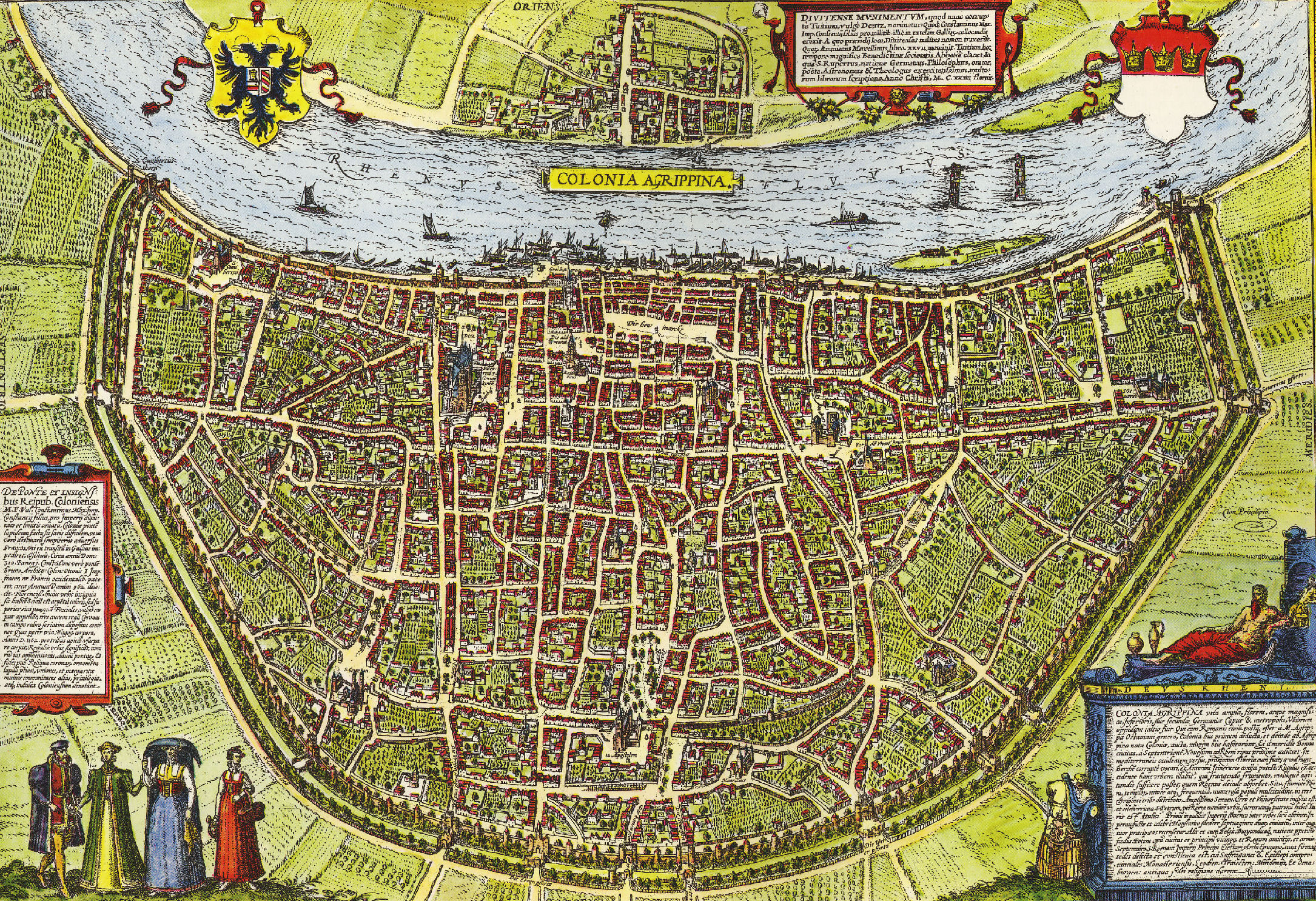
Cologne in the 16th century

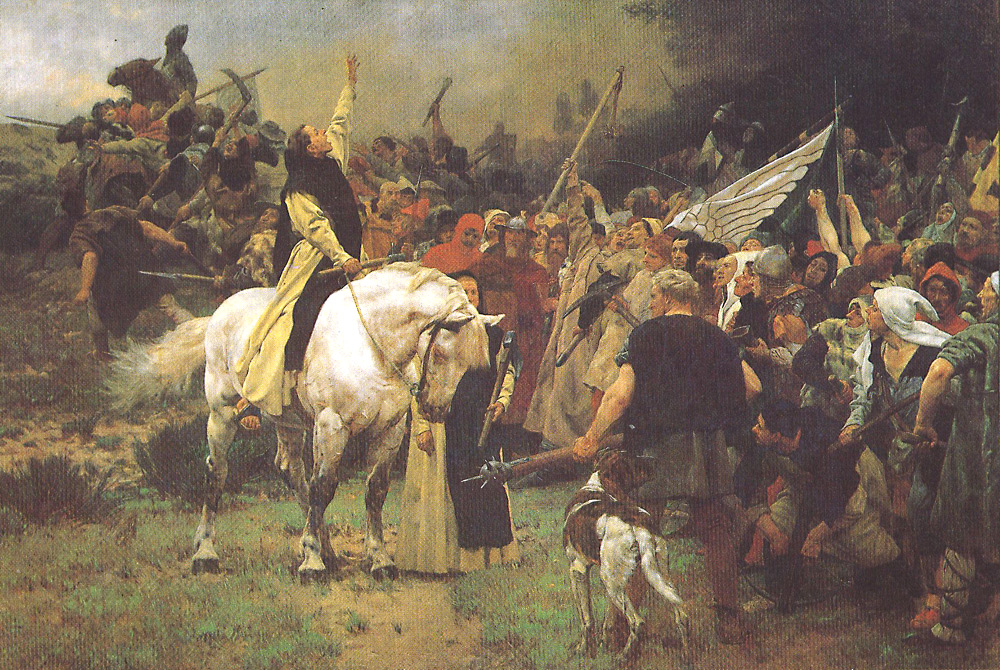
Peter Jansen's monumental painting Battle of Worringen, commissioned in 1889, hangs on the north wall of the Jan Wellem Hall in Düsseldorf's Historic City Hall.

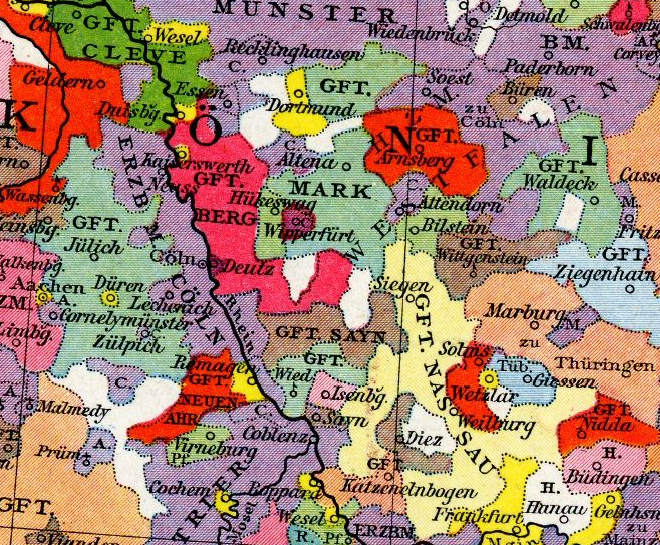
Section of an atlas for the 13th century: While Cologne is marked, only Kaiserswerth, which today belongs to the city, is found on the map in the Düsseldorf area.

The root of the enmity between the two cities is commonly cited as the Battle of Worringen on 5 June 1288, which, however, is to be regarded as "legend". At this battle, part of the War of the Limburg Succession, Siegfried von Westerburg, then Archbishop of Cologne, lost to John I, Duke of Brabant. Among others, Count Adolf von Berg, the citizens of Cologne and an army of peasants from the Bergisches fought on the side of the Brabant duke. There may also have been some inhabitants of the village in the estuary of the Düssel, but this is not considered certain. While Cologne was already a large medieval city with over 20,000 inhabitants and, as an original Roman foundation, more than 1200 years old, Düsseldorf was a smaller settlement in the County of Berg with an estimated 200 to 400 inhabitants. The inhabitants of the two unequal towns did not fight against each other in this battle, as is often depicted, but side by side.

Both places benefited from the outcome of the battle: after the defeat of the archbishop, Cologne no longer belonged to his archbishopric, and the archbishop himself could only enter the city for religious acts. Duke Adolf of Berg granted Düsseldorf city rights on 14 August 1288, though not out of "gratitude", as is rumoured. The ruler had recognised the village's strategic location on a flood-free headland with the Rhine forming a natural safeguard on the western border, seeing the city as a bulwark against the still archiepiscopal and at the time considerably larger Neuss situated on the other side of the river.

== Middle Ages and Early Modern Times ==
In the 13th century, Cologne was the "undisputed metropolis of Germany" with trade relations to many European countries, and with a size "of around 20,000–25,000 inhabitants, it was at the top of all German cities". After the relics of the Magi arrived in the city in 1164, for which a magnificent cathedral was built from 1248, Cologne also developed into an important pilgrimage city. In 1475, Cologne was elevated to the status of a Free Imperial City. In 1499, Johann Koelhoff the Younger formulated the city's self-image at that time in his chronicle:Cöllen eÿn Kroÿn - Boven allen steden schoÿn (Cologne a crown - Above all cities beautiful). One of the main reasons for the city's strong economic position was the so-called Stapelrecht (right to stack), which was granted to the people of Cologne in 1259 by Archbishop Konrad von Hochstaden. This right stipulated that goods shipped on the Rhine first had to be "stacked" (reloaded and stored) in Cologne, and that the people of Cologne had a right of first refusal. This stacking right was extended over the centuries, both territorially and in terms of the number of goods. Spatially, the right reached an extension of about 70 to 80 kilometres (43 to 50 mi) down the Rhine and 30 kilometres (19 mi) up the Rhine in the 18th century. Düsseldorf's economy was also affected by this situation.

In general, however, the future belonged to the cities on the Rhine, as the transport of goods on the river increased in the 14th century. Duke Wilhelm of Berg (1348-1408) recognised the signs of the times and began to expand and enlarge Düsseldorf, so that the city had 1500 to 2000 inhabitants in the 16th century. He had a new building erected for the Lambertus Church, endowed the associated monastery with relics to make the city attractive as a place of pilgrimage, completed the fortification of a stone wall and had the castle extended as a seat of power. His financial mainstay was the right granted to him by the king to levy the Bergisch Rhine toll, a privilege which he finally successfully enforced against opposition from Cologne. Under Wilhelm's descendants, however, Düsseldorf's development came to a standstill.

In the 16th century, Cologne lost its economic supremacy, as the city, surrounded by a ring of fortifications and without a hinterland, clung to old trade structures with which it was less and less able to assert itself against the strengthening territorial lords. Cologne was "largely concerned with defending what had been achieved and managing what existed, rather than focusing on innovation and progress". A debt accumulated in times of war and crisis, and the religious intolerance of the people of Cologne proved to be an obstacle to trade: "Holy Cologne" (et hillije Kölle) was the only imperial city that adhered to the Catholic faith. This intolerance forced Protestant citizens—such as nine wealthy merchant families in 1714—to move across the Rhine into Bergisch territory, which included Düsseldorf, where they established flourishing factories and trading houses. A widely visible symbol of the economic decline was the cathedral crane on the unfinished Cologne Cathedral, on which no further construction had been carried out since the 1530s for lack of money. According to travelogues, the houses in Cologne at this time were in very poor condition, and the proportion of poor people in the population was comparatively high.

Düsseldorf, on the other hand, from 1614 after interruptions once again the residential city of the Dukes of Jülich-Berg, developed during these years: "As a city politically, economically, militarily and socially dependent on the prince and concentrated on court and princely administration, Düsseldorf offered a completely different picture than Cologne." Under Johann Wilhelm II (called Jan Wellem) and his wife Anna Maria from the Italian Medici family, Düsseldorf had a golden age, as the prince, residing as Elector in Düsseldorf Palace from 1690, further enlarged and expanded the city and increased his court, which attracted more nobles to the city. Jan Wellem also developed the city's infrastructure by having streets paved and lit and by promoting the establishment of postal and shipping lines as well as factories. The electoral couple built a picture gallery, promoted the settlement of renowned artists and, from 1694, had an opera house built from their own funds——including Anna Maria's dowry of 400,000 Reichsthaler.

After Jan Wellem's death in 1716, there was a brief economic slump in Düsseldorf, however, the city recovered from it under Prince Karl Theodor (1724-1799): "In contrast to Cologne, where every innovation met with strong resistance from the bourgeoisie organised in the Gaffeln [guilds of craftsmen] and only a few progressive merchants advocated reforms, in Düsseldorf enlightened government politicians promoted liberal economic development."

In 1786, the Düsseldorf producer of mostert (hot mustard), Johann Cornelius Bergrath, contradicted an advertisement in the Kölnischer Stadtboten that real "true Düsseldorfer Mostert [...]" can be bought in Cologne's Schildergasse and pointed out how to recognise "the genuine unadulterated Düsseldorfer Mostard". Incidentally, his Düsseldorf mustard factory was later located in the house "Stadt Köln". Eau de Cologne, on the other hand, was also produced in Düsseldorf without protest, by the Düsseldorf line of the Farina family.

== Napoleon and Prussia ==
In 1794, the troops of revolutionary France occupied Cologne; they occupied Düsseldorf the following year. While Cologne, like the entire left bank of the Rhine, became part of France, Düsseldorf remained occupied until 1801. In 1806, it became the capital of the new Grand Duchy of Berg under Napoleon's brother-in-law, Joachim Murat. From 1798, the Rhine formed a customs border, so that producers from the right bank of the Rhine were deprived of markets on the left bank, while the entire French area was open to the people of Cologne for duty-free trade. Cologne's Stapelrecht (right to stack goods) remained in place to secure the income from it for the now French city. However, the strict guild order, which had shaped Cologne's economy and society for centuries, was abolished.

From 2 November 1811, Emperor Napoleon stayed in Düsseldorf for three days. He was given a festive welcome with military honours and a replica of the Arc de Triomphe. For his state visit, Jägerhof Palace had been prepared as the imperial residence. Napoleon's minister Pierre-Louis Roederer wrote to his wife that the festivities in Düsseldorf had been the most glamorous of the Emperor's state trip and described the city as Little Paris. From Düsseldorf, Napoleon travelled on to Cologne, where he is reported to have said: "Go to Düsseldorf and learn there how to receive an emperor." The reason for this (unverified) statement is said to have been the people of Cologne were having problems getting together enough men for the guard of honour to receive him. However, the Düsseldorfers' hopes that the French state would reduce the burden of customs and taxes after this visit were unfulfilled. Moreover, 90 per cent of the Düsseldorf men recruited for Napoleon's army fell in the wars he fought.

However, Napoleon's visit had positive effects on Düsseldorf in terms of urban development. A few days after his visit, the emperor issued the so-called "Beautification Decree", on the basis of which the demolition of the city fortifications, begun in 1801, received new impetus. Its transformation into elegant promenades, including today's Königsallee, and the extension of the Hofgarten to the banks of the Rhine were carried out. While spacious streets and gardens were laid out in Düsseldorf, Cologne remained in the "stranglehold" of the fortifications, which were extended even further and permanently hindered urban development. "Cologne rested within itself, and here, due to the narrowness [...] everything was a little more neighbourly [...]. Düsseldorf offered [...] with its avenues, parks, gardens and luxury the outward appearance of a residential and garden city."

After the reorganisation of Europe at the Congress of Vienna, both cities were annexed to the Kingdom of Prussia in 1815, and from 1822 belonged to the newly created Rhine Province. The seat of the state provincial administration became Koblenz, and the university came to Bonn. In 1819, the Düsseldorf Academy of Arts was re-founded. An important artistic movement of the 19th century was the Düsseldorf School of Painting, which enriched the city's cultural life, giving it the status of an international centre of art. In 1820, Prince Frederick of Prussia became commander of the 20th Division in Düsseldorf and settled with his family in Jägerhof Palace. The garrison and court life of the following years were reminiscent of earlier times as a royal seat, and Prince Friedrich and his wife Luise promoted the social and cultural life of the city. In 1824, the Provincial Diet also took up residence in Düsseldorf. All this, according to historian Horst A. Wessel, meant an "unexpected setback" for Cologne: "Köln erhielt […] keinen Vorrang, nicht einmal eine hervorgehobene Stellung unter den preußischen Städten", (in English: "Cologne received [...] no precedence, not even a prominent position among the Prussian cities.") This feeling of disadvantage was hardly counteracted by the fact that the Prussian state and its ruling dynasty—supported by a broadly felt romantic reflection on historical roots and the Middle Ages—financially supported the further construction of Cologne Cathedral. Düsseldorf citizens also collected donations for the cathedral, whose completion because of rediscovered medieval façade outlines was perceived as a national task.

In 1843, the time of the Vormärz, the so-called Köln-Düsseldorfer Verbrüderungsfest (Cologne-Düsseldorf fraternization festival) took place in Düsseldorf. This festival was a political demonstration by Rhenish citizens for the retention of the "Rhenish law" introduced by Napoleon. As Musspreußen (literal:Must Prussia), Cologne and Düsseldorf citizens thus expressed their jointly felt distance to Prussia. In August 2001, during the event Cologne + Düsseldorf: more than a utopia..., the then Lord Mayor of Cologne, Fritz Schramma, reminded the audience of this, he recalled the celebration with an anecdote:

[...]die Preußen versuchten, das französische Zivilgesetzbuch, den Code Napoleon, wieder abzuschaffen. Die gesamte Rheinprovinz protestierte heftig dagegen. […] Als die Kölner hörten, dass der Provinziallandtag in Düsseldorf die Rechtsänderung einstimmig abgelehnt hatte, beschlossen sie spontan, mit Booten nach Düsseldorf zu fahren. Die Düsseldorfer wiederum begrüßten die Kölner begeistert mit den folgenden Worten: ‚Köln ist unsere wahrhafte Metropole; Köln verdient es, uns voran zu gehen. Wir erkennen ihm diesen Ruf ganz und ohne Neid zu‘. Waren das noch Zeiten! dachte ich, als ich das las.

[...]the Prussians tried to abolish the French civil code, the Code Napoleon, again. The entire Rhine province protested vehemently against this. [...] When the people of Cologne heard that the Provincial Diet in Düsseldorf had unanimously rejected the change in law, they spontaneously decided to travel to Düsseldorf on boats. The people of Düsseldorf in turn greeted the people of Cologne enthusiastically with the following words: 'Cologne is our true metropolis; Cologne deserves to lead us. We grant it this reputation wholeheartedly and without envy'. Those were the days! I thought when I read that

— Fritz Schramma

=== 19th and 20th century ===
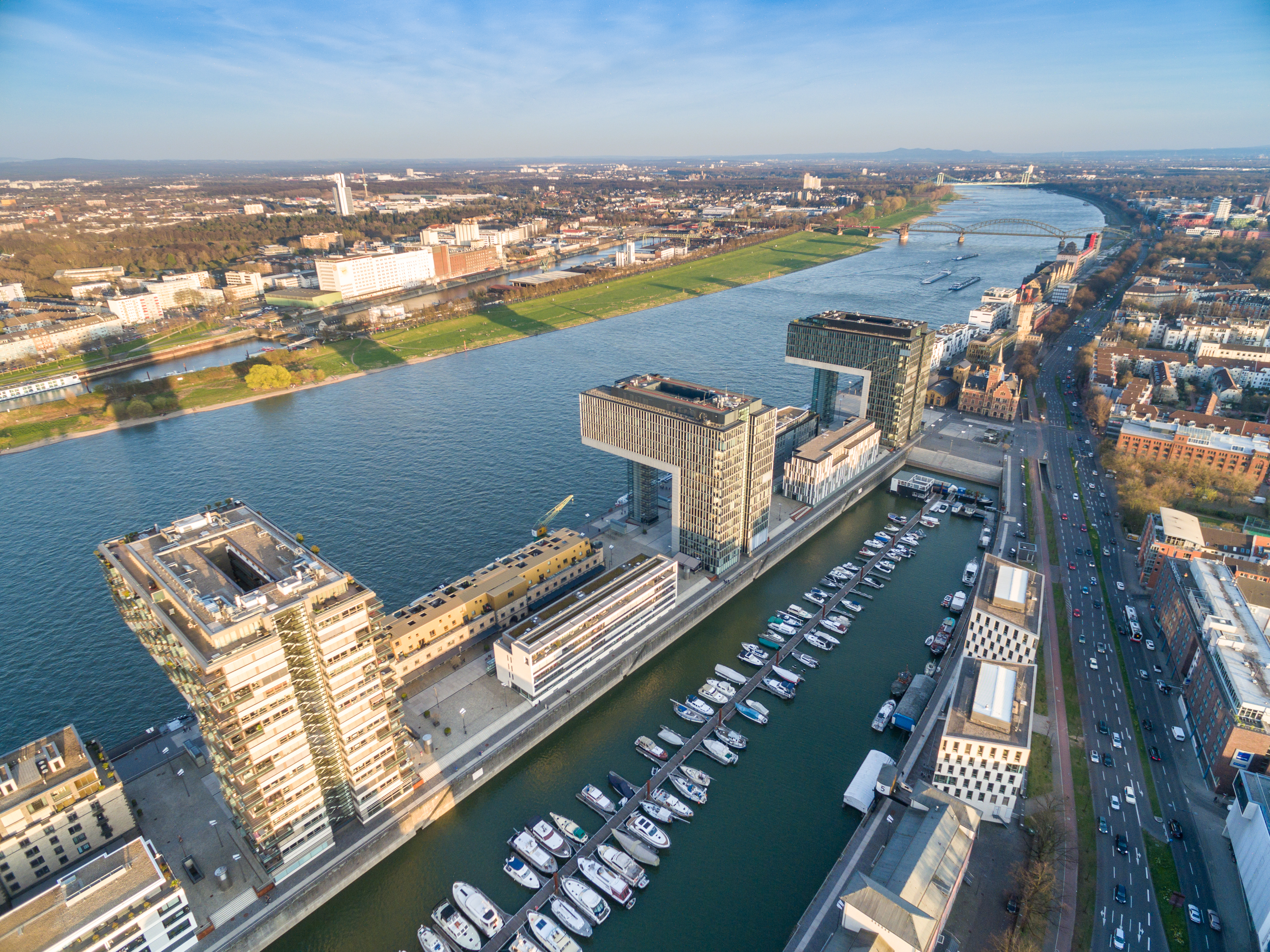
Crane houses in the Rheinauhafen in Cologne

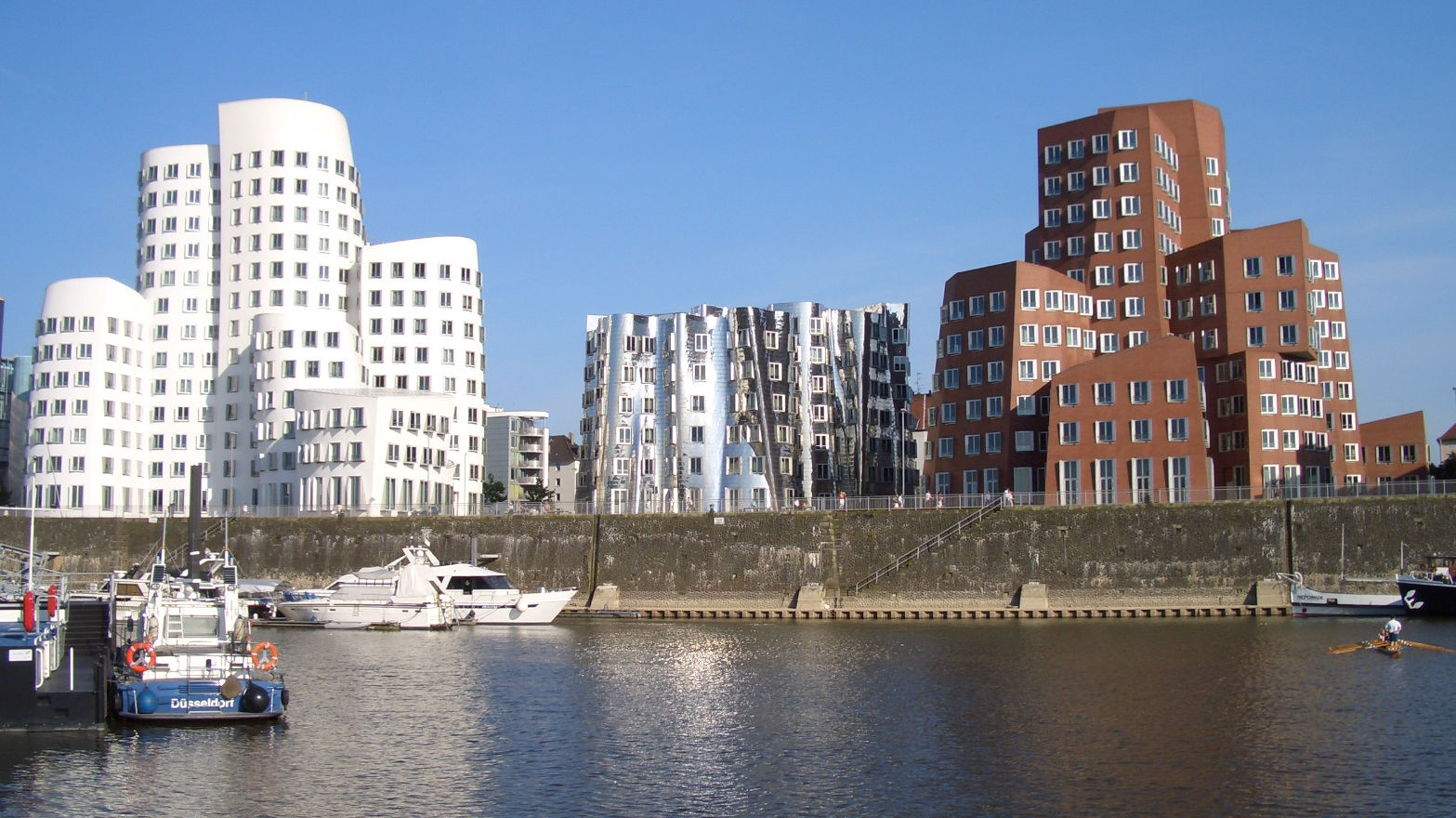
Gehry buildings at Zollhafen in Düsseldorf

The actual rivalry between the two cities of Düsseldorf and Cologne began with industrialisation, as location qualities played an increasingly important role in the settlement of businesses and trades. Cologne compensated for the loss of the right to stack by relying on the modern means of transport, the railway, and developing into a central transport hub. In 1825, Cologne merchant Peter Heinrich Merkens founded the Preußisch-Rheinische Dampfschifffahrtsgesellschaft (Prussian-Rhenish Steamship Company), a forerunner of today's Köln-Düsseldorfer, which has its legal seat in Düsseldorf but is administered from Cologne and which, despite its name, has no regular scheduled shipping service between the two cities in its timetable. In Düsseldorf, "the sleepy city of art and gardens", the path to modern economic and transport policy was delayed.

Both cities developed into "industrial cities" in the course of the 19th century, with Düsseldorf establishing itself as the "desk of the Ruhr", while in Cologne the focus was on banking and insurance.

From the time before First World War, both cities experienced considerable population growth. On the one hand, this was due to the enormous immigration of people from rural areas—like the Eifel or the Bergisches Land—but also to the incorporation of surrounding villages.

In the 1920s, the competition between the two cities was characterised by the rivalry between their Lord Mayors—in Cologne this was Konrad Adenauer (Centre, 1917-1933) and in Düsseldorf Robert Lehr (DNVP, 1924-1933), both of whom were known for their great self-confidence. "The fact that they did not always agree and were intent on their and their cities' advantage speaks for their drive." For example, Adenauer lobbied massively for his Düsseldorf colleague Lehr not to be appointed to the planning committee of the provincial committee preparing for the Rhenish Millennium Celebration. Because of the Machtergreifung (seizure of power) by the National Socialists, both men lost their office in 1933. After World War II, Lehr was one of the co-founders of the Christian Democratic Union of Germany (CDU) and became a minister under Adenauer in 1950.

After 1945, both cities claimed to have been immune to National Socialism as "Rhenish, Catholic and anti-Prussian" cities, but according to recent research this has turned out to be a "modern fairy tale"—both Cologne and Düsseldorf were subject to Nazi terror with purges and exclusion just like any other German city. During the war itself, 90 per cent of Cologne's city centre was destroyed, 80 per cent of other parts of the city, whereas Düsseldorf was "only" 40 per cent destroyed and many representative buildings remained. This, and the proximity to the Ruhr Area, persuaded the British cabinet in 1946 to designate Düsseldorf as the capital of the newly created federal state of North Rhine-Westphalia.

In 1988, 700 years after the Battle of Worringen, a comparison of the two cities from an urban geography perspective found Cologne had its strengths as a transport hub on water, road and rail, and with regard to the petrochemical pipe network, while Düsseldorf was ahead in air transport and better positioned in the service industry. According to a 2011 ranking of the economic power of major German cities the Institute of the German Economy ranked Düsseldorf sixth, while Cologne was 34th.

Cologne's Lord Mayor Schramma argued that Cologne and Düsseldorf could only live together in partnership when it came to "higher-level matters"; as an example, he cited the joint bid to host the 2012 Summer Olympics. As soon as it came to direct competition, however, "controversies" arose:

Nach dem zweiten Weltkrieg aber wurden Standortfragen, die Fragen der Ansiedlung zentraler Verkehrsobjekte oder auch von Institutionen zum Zankapfel zwischen beiden Städten. Es begann mit der Frage, ob das neugegründete Nordrhein-Westfalen nun einen oder zwei Flughäfen brauchen würde, und ob der Düsseldorfer Flughafen dem Kölner Flughafen vorzuziehen sei. Es ging um die Frage der Landeshauptstadt, und es ging um die Ansiedlung des Landschaftsverbandes Rheinland.

After the Second World War, however, location issues, the questions of locating central transport objects or even institutions became a bone of contention between the two cities. It began with the question of whether the newly founded North Rhine-Westphalia would need one or two airports, and whether Düsseldorf Airport was preferable to Cologne Airport. It was about the question of the state capital, and it was about the settlement of the Landschaftsverband Rheinland

— Fritz Schramma

== Population figures (1140 to present) ==
As early as Roman times, Cologne had around 30,000 inhabitants; however, this number dropped to around half from the 3rd century onwards. In the 12th century, 20,000 people again lived within the city walls. After the transfer of the relics of the Holy Three Kings to Cologne, and its growing importance as a pilgrimage city, the number of inhabitants rose again to 40,000. This number remained relatively constant until the 19th century.

Düsseldorf had about 200 to 400 inhabitants at the time of the Battle of Worringen in 1288 and the subsequent granting of city rights. In the following centuries, the population increased slowly, albeit steadily. With the onset of industrialisation in the mid-19th century, the number of people settled in Düsseldorf grew more than fourfold, to 63,000. In the same period, and for the same reason, the number of Cologne citizens tripled to 125,000, so that Cologne had twice as many inhabitants as Düsseldorf at that time.

Incorporations and economic growth brought both major cities to six-figure population figures.

Cologne has been in the seven-digit range several times with fluctuating numbers and currently sees itself as a "city of millions" again (as of 2015).

== Travelogues ==
Especially in the travelogues popular in the 18th and 19th centuries, the two Rhenish metropolises were often in focus. Moritz August von Thümmel, minister to the Duke of Saxe-Coburg-Saalfeld, wrote to the Hereditary Prince of Saxe-Coburg on 6 June 1772:

In Cologne, where we stayed for a whole day to rest, we wished ourselves back on our ship ten times. I cannot remember having seen such an unpleasant place and I would not like to be Emperor if I had to be crowned there. Imagine a dirty town three times the size of Erfurt and three times as dead; where in every street there are a few churches and monasteries, where the constant ringing of bells tires the ears and the sight of individual haggard and ragged beggars tires the eye to death. We visited a Carthusian monastery there and were moved to the point of lamentation at the misery to which sensible people can voluntarily condemn themselves out of imaginary religious service. The next day we had a more pleasant journey. We went via Düsseldorf, a beautiful, charming town. The first thing we visited there was the magnificent Bildergalerie, where the Rubens occupy an entire room and most of the paintings by the inimitable van der Werff are kept.

The Royal Prussian Kriegs-, Domänen- und Forstrat Christian Friederich Meyer travelled through the Rhineland in 1793 and wrote his Views of a Journey through the Clevische and a Part of the Holländische via Crefeld, Düsseldorff and Elberfeld, with Some Economic Considerations Taken Thereby, in the Year 1794. Together with a Second Economic Tour of the Rhine Regions from Wesel to Coblenz in June 1794. In it Meyer reported on the "crowds of ragged beggars" in Cologne and praised the "industrious" in the Bergisches, who was "therefore much more moral, healthy and happy" than "the idler in Cologne, where the latter is only a blind animal, the more dangerous the more systematically idleness is practised".

The two cities in the 17th century

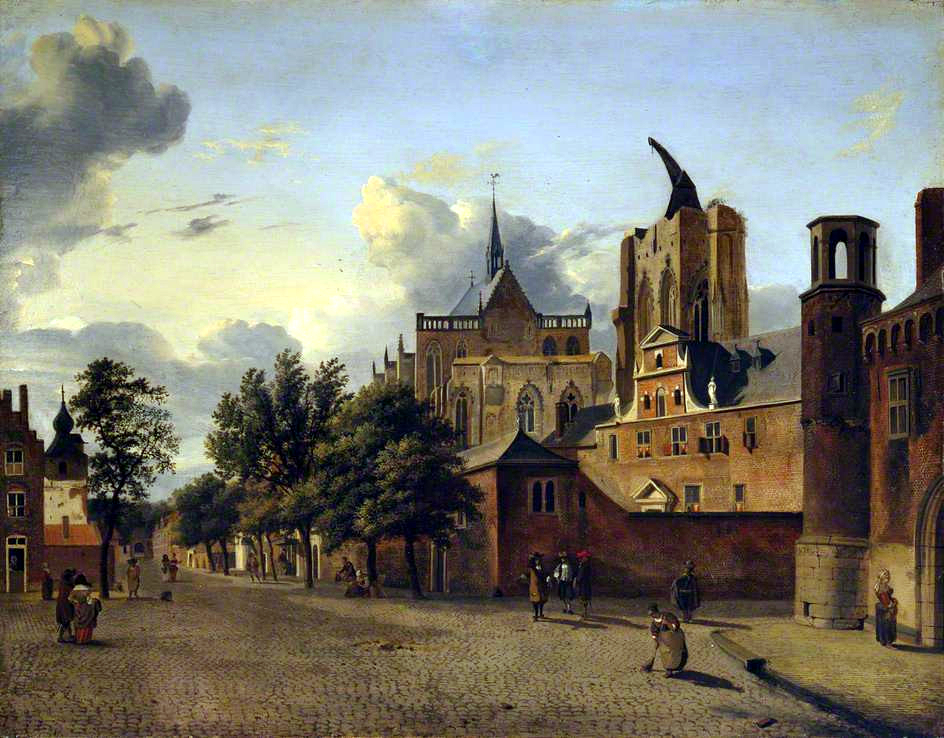
Cologne

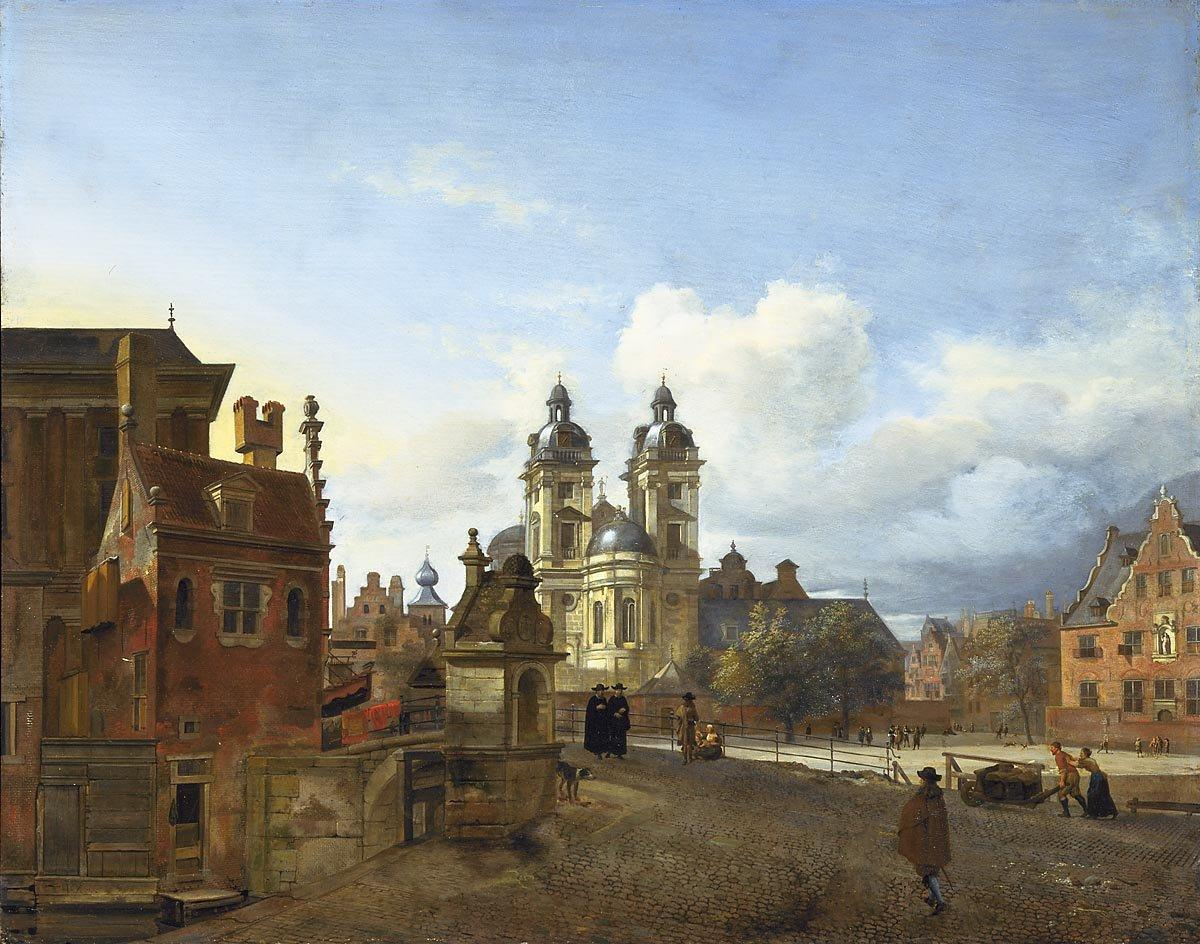
Düsseldorf

A French émigré who stayed mainly in Wuppertal in 1792/1793 found Cologne "gloomy and sad". The writer, Georg Forster, who also visited Cologne, used these words to describe the cathedral city, noting that almost half of the inhabitants, i.e. about 20,000 people, had to be counted as "rabble". And he drew the comparison: "What a sky-wide difference between Cologne and this nice, clean, prosperous Düsseldorf!"

Ernst Moritz Arndt was particularly harsh in his criticism of the cathedral city. "Cologne is indisputably the oldest city in Germany, and it has always imagined itself not a little on this antiquity, and until the latest times has stubbornly sought to preserve even in customs and institutions everything that should have been cheaply old and obsolete" was almost the kindest thing he had to say about Cologne, but beyond that he called the people of Cologne "treacherous" and "cold toads". His contemporary, Johann Kaspar Riesbeck, a German writer living in Switzerland, wrote to his brother in Paris: "Cologne, brother, is in every respect the most detestable city in Germany."

Quite a few travel writers attributed Cologne's backwardness to the dominance of Catholicism; the position of Protestantism was an "irritant", as it was for the Rev. Joseph Gregor Lang: "A dozen workhouses, which one would soon see erected, if the Protestant tradesmen's hands were not tied by intolerant recalcitrance, would easily cleanse the streets and certainly control the evil born only of idleness and laziness." In addition, he mocked monastery churches that were "grafted with all kinds of statues and pictures" like "Nuremberg stalls". The Protestant historian Philipp Wilhelm Gercken, on the other hand, believed that other travel accounts criticising the lack of cleanliness in Cologne were "exaggerating" and "that I have not found it so bad for a long time."

As late as the Biedermeier period, the writer Karl Julius Weber wrote: "The cheerful Düsseldorf is doubly pleasing if one comes from the gloomy Cöln."

== Culture ==
=== Carnival ===
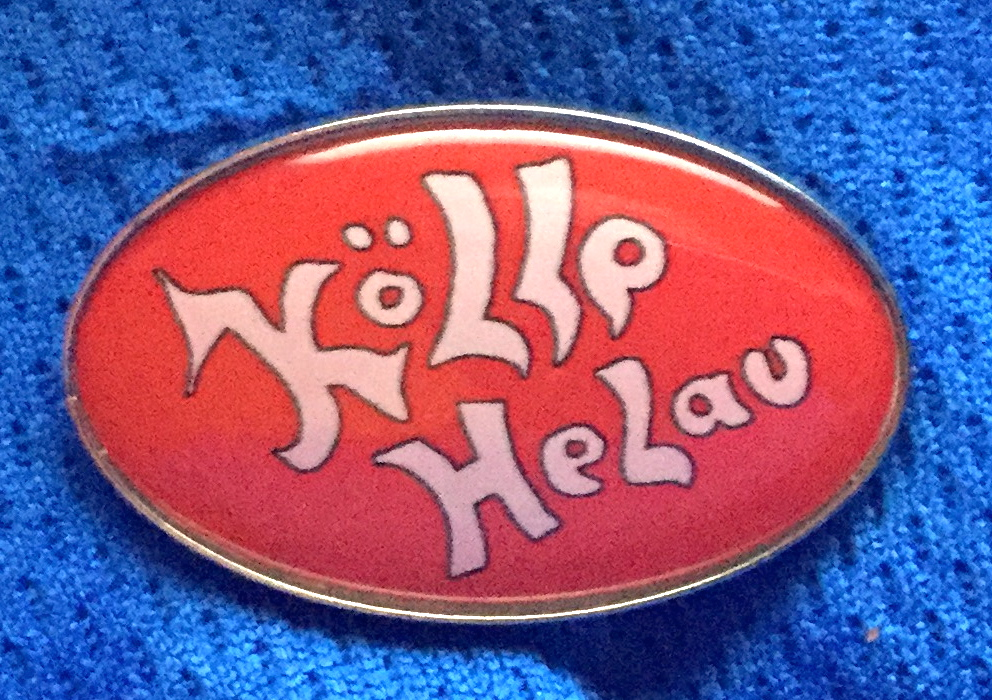
Unsaleable goods: Kölle Helau

The folkloric rivalry between Cologne and Düsseldorf had its first origins in the carnival. For centuries, the people of Cologne and Düsseldorf celebrated carnival independently of each other. But in 1823, the first carnival "ordered" by the citizens was organised by the Festordnenden Comité in Cologne. This model was followed in Düsseldorf, as in other Rhenish cities:

"[...] in Düsseldorf they did not wait long to celebrate carnival according to the Cologne model. A little envy of the big neighbour Cologne probably played a role in the effort to revive the carnival days."

But not only "envy" was the reason for carnival parades and events in Düsseldorf, Bonn and Aachen, but also economic interests: Carnival fans did not spend their money on festivities in their hometowns, but travelled "in droves" to Cologne, which prompted these cities to organise their own parades.

The Düsseldorf carnival only developed into a serious competitor for the Cologne carnival after the First World War, as the festival represented an increasingly important economic factor and there was a fight for a share of this emerging "carnival industry". In 1937, however, the Kölner Stadt-Anzeiger reported that "the Cologne carnival was becoming more and more important for the Rhineland beyond the city, while the Fastnacht in Aachen, Bonn and Düsseldorf was a local event".

A first testimony to the depiction of rivalry in carnival is the design of a parade float from 1914: the artist Heinrich Recker depicted the dispute over the construction of a planned electric rapid transit railway between Cologne and Düsseldorf as a fight between a 4711 bottle (Cologne) and a mustard tube (Düsseldorf). The construction of the railway did not come about, but not because the cities had blocked themselves, but because the minister responsible initially feared for the monopoly of the Preußische Staatseisenbahnen and refused permission and finally the outbreak of the First World War finally prevented the construction, which continued to be discussed. In 1935, a Cologne float design depicted Düsseldorf sitting on mustard pots under the caption Einmal eine große Dame sein.

The carnival rituals in Düsseldorf and Köln differ: in Cologne, for example, three men, one of whom represents a woman as a "virgin" presides over the Dreigestirn. In Düsseldorf there is a prince with a female "Venetia". Here the fool's call is Helau, whereas in Cologne it is Alaaf. At the end of the festivities, the Nubbel (scapegoat for peoples' problems) is burnt in Cologne, while in Düsseldorf it is the Hoppeditz (a doll burned at the end of the carnival).

The enmity is also cultivated musically: The Cologne group Domstürmer sings "Über Köln lacht die Sonne, über Düsseldorf die Welt" (The sun smiles over Cologne, the world over Düsseldorf) and prophesies that Altbier would make people ill. The Düsseldorf Düssel-Disharmoniker rejoiced in the song "Da schwimmt 'ne Kölner" (There swims a Cologne) about renewed flooding in the cathedral city. Anyone who visited the website of the trio, which disbanded in 2011 and pretended to be from Cologne received the message "Access Denied".

Beyond initially obvious differences, however, carnival is also different in character: defining elements in Cologne, according to the head of the Rosenmontagszug Christoph Kuckelkorn, are, unlike in the integration of long-standing traditions and a strong anchoring in the population. This results in a more "balancing" and "popular" carnival in Cologne in contrast to Düsseldorf, where the citizens are not involved to the same extent. In this sense, the people of Cologne see the Düsseldorf carnival as an "unnatural phenomenon" that was "artificially created". The Düsseldorfer loves the "peppered political satire without regard for losses"; the Kölner prefers the "tasteful political joke" that does not hurt too much, according to the analysis of the Düsseldorf float builder Jacques Tilly. Michael Euler-Schmidt and Marcus Leifeld describe the carnival relationship of the two cities as an "invigorating competitive relationship", but for all the competition "there was and is always also a friendly togetherness".

About the mutual attacks in the respective Rose Monday parades, Cologne's parade leader Kuckelkorn said: "The parade does not have to live on provocation alone. People in the north of Cologne do that. I don't know the town exactly, but it must be some village."

=== Benrather Line ===
In the book Streit am Rhein it says:"'The 40 kilometres between the two cities have carved a rift into the Rhineland that is lovingly cultivated by both Cologne and Düsseldorf residents." There is indeed a border between the two cities—the Benrather Sprachlinie, which runs south of Düsseldorf and distinguishes the dialects of the two cities based on sound shifts: For example, the High German word machen is maache in Kölsch and maken in Düsseldorfer Platt, which is why it is also called the "maken-machen line". The Düsseldorfer Platt belongs to the Lower Franconian dialects, Kölsch in turn to the ripuarian.

The Düsseldorf writer Heinrich Heine was critical of both dialects: in Cologne, Köbes clashed with Marizzebill in a dialect "that sounds like rotten eggs, almost smells"; he disqualified the language of his hometown, saying that one could already notice "the frog croaking of the Dutch swamps" in it.

=== Millowitsch family ===
In 1880, the father of the urkölschen folk actor Willy Millowitsch was born in Düsseldorf, a fact that his son Peter finds "quite embarrassing", since Düsseldorf is, after all, the "arch-enemy". Since ca. 2000/01, at the birthplace of Peter Wilhelm Millowitsch, the traditional brewery Uerige in Düsseldorf, there hangs a commemorative plaque created by Ulrich Grenzheuser as a bronze relief.

== Folklore ==
In 1958, the people of Cologne mocked in a pamphlet that around 1800, "while Cologne's fame and splendour were already known in every corner of the world", only about 8000 people had lived at the mouth of the Düssel. In the article, the cliché was used that Düsseldorf—in contrast to Roman Cologne—was a "parvenu" and "upstart", "provided with all the attributes of the cultureless nouveau riche, which is now also trying to overtake the old cultural metropolis". The reason for this publication is said to have been the envy of the people of Cologne that jet planes were permitted to land at Düsseldorf Airport but not (yet) at Cologne/Bonn Airport.

This episode illustrates the rivalry between the two cities and that it often emanates from the Cologne side. One possible reason for this was provided by the Kölner Stadt-Anzeiger: "Historically, the people of Cologne are always the offended ones." The psychologist Stephan Grünewald diagnosed the decision to designate Düsseldorf as the state capital in 1946 in particular as a "severe narcissistic Kränkung" (offense) of the people of Cologne who were so proud of their past.

The rivalry between the two largest cities in the federal state of North Rhine-Westphalia is often characterised in terms like "the two divas on the Rhine" or enemy sisters.

=== Nurturing the rivalry ===
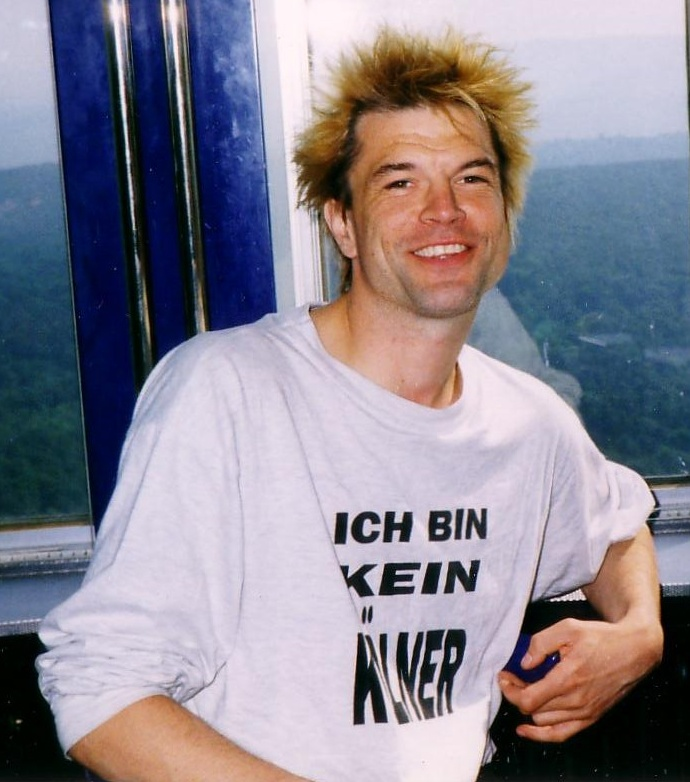
Campino, Half-British singer of the band Die Toten Hosen: "I'm not from Cologne".

Cities have to work on their distinctiveness to compete. In this competition there is the experience and fear of shrinking processes. Therefore, targeted attempts are made to retain residents and attract new ones. This can only be achieved by showing the reasons why it is better to live in Cologne than in Düsseldorf, for example, or vice versa.

While the centre of Düsseldorf is on the right bank of the Rhine, the centre of Cologne is on the left bank; in Cologne, the right bank of the Rhine is known as Schäl Sick (scheele Seite) (wrong side). The beer in Cologne is called "Kölsch" and is light, that in Düsseldorf, "Altbier" (Alt), is dark. Other "antipoles" are the football clubs 1. FC Köln and Fortuna Düsseldorf, the ice hockey clubs Kölner Haie and Düsseldorfer EG and the bands Die Toten Hosen and BAP.

The Cologne cabaret artist, Jürgen Becker, commented on the musical rivalry that in the "village on the Düssel" there had been "Tote Hose" (dead pants) for a very long time - which is why the most famous band from Düsseldorf chose this name. At a concert in Cologne, Die Toten Hosen played the song by Marius Müller-Westernhagen "Ich bin froh, dass ich kein Dicker bin" (I'm glad I'm not a fatty) but with the lyrics "Ich bin froh, dass ich kein Kölner bin" (I'm glad I'm not a Colognian), which Wolfgang Niedecken of the Cologne group BAP found courageous. The Cologne a cappella group Wise Guys countered with the song No, no, no!, lamenting the origin of the holiday acquaintance from the city "where the beer tastes as it is called".

In May 2016, the British singer Adele was confronted with the rivalry between the two cities at a concert in Cologne. When she brought a ten-year-old girl from Düsseldorf on stage for a photograph, boos rang out from the audience. Adele told them to "Shut up". Later she inquired why they did not like Düsseldorf: "Can somebody enlighten me?" She was told, "that's just the way it is". She recommended they, "Get over it!".

A particularly bitter "enmity" exists between the two ice hockey clubs. Since the late 1970s, the duels between the two arch-rivals have often been matches for the German championship; both teams have won the championship title eight times as of 2016. As one of the mutual jibes, the Düsseldorfer EG (DEG) auctioned two plastic sharks auctioned on eBay at the end of December 2015 before a local game describing them as: "Not all teeth left, so often not really biting." The singer, Campino, and some Düsseldorfers put a DEG logo on the roof of the team bus of the Kölner Haien (Cologne Sharks) during the 220th ice hockey game between the Düsseldorf EG and the Cologne Sharks on 19 October 2018. The action went unnoticed by the for several days and their bus unintentionally advertised their rivals.

While fan articles from neighbouring rival football club Borussia Mönchengladbach were certainly on offer in shops and department stores in Düsseldorf, in autumn 2017 an editor from the Rheinische Post searched in vain for articles from 1. FC Köln. A Kaufhof employee surmised: "The rivalry between Düsseldorf and Gladbach is already great. But if we still carried Cologne jerseys, they would probably quickly have holes in them".

In 2005, the Cologne Emons Verlag published the book Alles was man über Düsseldorf wissen muss (Everything you need to know about Düsseldorf); it had blank pages. In Cologne, one can buy a "Kölsch" key for a computer keyboard in Cologne to replace the Alt key. Students at the Fachhochschule Köln created a website entitled "Cologne loves Düsseldorf and Düsseldorf loves Cologne". Their summary:

Die weit verbreitete Ansicht, zwischen den Bewohnern der rheinischen Metropole und denen der Landeshauptstadt Nordrhein-Westfalens bestehe eine Befindlichkeit, die irgendwo zwischen tief empfundener Antipathie und Apartheid angesiedelt sei, ist falsch. Der Irrtum beruht möglicherweise auf mangelndem Einblick ins historische Geschehen, falscher Interpretation von Büttenreden, Propaganda linksrheinischer Separatisten oder völliger Unkenntnis des rheinischen Humors.

The widespread view that there is a state of mind between the inhabitants of the Rhineland metropolis and those of the state capital of North Rhine-Westphalia that lies somewhere between deeply felt antipathy and apartheid is wrong. The error is possibly based on a lack of insight into historical events, misinterpretation of carnival speeches, propaganda of left-Rhine separatists or complete ignorance of Rhenish humour.

— Unknown

In his book Lost in Germany, journalist Brian Melican describes the two major Rhenish cities from a British perspective: "The self-proclaimed 'most beautiful city on the Rhine' feels, I submit, that it has only itself to blame. Just like its neighbour. Cologne also considers itself a planet in its own right." Düsseldorf, he feels, has been the "quarrel partner" of Cologne "roughly since the big bang", which reminds Melican of the enmity between France on the one hand and the British and Germany on the other. He is always amazed, he says, at the ferocity of their rivalry: "In my mind's eye, I always see Cologne and Düsseldorf as two gangsters meeting at night on the fog-shrouded banks of the Rhine, exchanging Mafioso sayings with glow sticks in the corner of their mouths like, 'This river plain isn't big enough for the both of us' [...]."

The cabaret artist Konrad Beikircher reports in the chapter "War in the Neander Valley" of his book Et kütt wie't kütt. Das rheinische Grundgesetz (It comes as it comes. The Rhenish Basic Law) how taxi drivers from the other cities are allegedly sent astray by the taxi centres in Düsseldorf and Cologne when they ask for directions.

=== "Forbidden City" ===
Residents of both cities refer to the other as the "Forbidden City"; in Cologne it is considered taboo to pronounce the word "Düsseldorf".

In Cologne folklore it is also said that people from Düsseldorf needed a visa to visit the cathedral city, and anecdotes exist about the return journey:

Köln ist in der Düsseldorfer Innenstadt hinreichend ausgeschildert – sich hier zu verfahren ist nahezu unmöglich. In Köln muss man dagegen schon wissen, dass Neuss bei Düsseldorf liegt und den Hinweisschildern dorthin folgen. Der Kommentar des Kölner Straßenverkehrsamtes dazu: ‚Wir können nicht ausschließen, daß es noch Restschilder [nach Düsseldorf] aus den dreißiger Jahren gibt.‘ Laut Oberbürgermeister Schramma hat die Schilder übrigens auch noch niemand vermisst..

Cologne is sufficiently signposted in Düsseldorf city centre - it is almost impossible to get lost here. In Cologne, on the other hand, you have to know that Neuss is near Düsseldorf and follow the signs there. The comment of the Cologne road traffic office on this: 'We cannot rule out that there are still residual signs [to Düsseldorf] from the 1930s'. According to Lord Mayor Schramma, no one has missed the signs yet.

— Jutta Gay/Stephan Meyer

=== Advertising ===
The mutual prejudices between the people of Cologne and Düsseldorf also appear in advertising.

The Kölsch brewery Früh has been advertising for years with mottos that repeatedly target Düsseldorf, its Altbier and its inhabitants, such as, "Now also in the most important villages around Cologne", "Not a bit of Alt" or "To relieve the A3 now also in Düsseldorf". An advertising agency from Düsseldorf thought up the slogans. A counter-campaign followed: "Früh übt sich, was ein Alt will werden. (Early practice makes perfect)"

McDonald's also made use of the theme and in 2010 advertised McWraps in Düsseldorf, for example, with the slogan "Try it before a Cologne does." In Cologne, there were the same posters, except that the "Kölner" had now become a "Düsseldorfer". An Expedia blog awarded points for various features of both cities; Düsseldorf won 5:4.

The Cologne Zoo ran a self-deprecating advertisement in 2012 suggesting Düsseldorf visitors, "Take a look at the Cologne monkeys." A Düsseldorf forwarding agency, in turn, promises "Removals worldwide ... also to Cologne". An online undertaker advertised on posters at the Köln Messe/Deutz railway station, "Every hour a Düsseldorfer dies", although it remains open whether the message is directed at Cologne residents or Düsseldorf residents.

DB Regio NRW let a train conductor have his say on advertising posters in 2013: "If I, as a Cologne resident, travel to Düsseldorf every day, I do it just for you!" According to the Solinger Tageblatt, vehicles with the inscription S-Bahn Köln running to the Düsseldorf Airport Terminal Station is said to have been met with astonishment in the state capital.

In 2017, a discount chain in Düsseldorf advertised with large posters, "Time to make up. Kölle Alaaf." Düsseldorf's largest daily newspaper found the following commentary fitting: "Hallo!?!! What's up, you creative types? Reconciliation is all well and good, but to put up a big billboard with this unfortunate word on Düsseldorf's main roads is a slap in the face for Düsseldorf's tolerant revellers."

== Balances ==
In the 2012 book Düsseldorf - Cologne, the only scholarly work to date devoted to the subject of the rivalry between the two major cities, the historian and former head of the Düsseldorf City Archives, Clemens von Looz-Corswarem, concludes:

Düsseldorf und Köln sind heute zwei […] gleich gewichtige Städte. […] Im historischen Vergleich hat Düsseldorf in den vergangenen drei Jahrhunderten die größere wirtschaftliche Leistung erbracht. Köln konnte hingegen seine historisch gewachsene kulturelle Eigenart bewahren (wobei sich „kulturell“ keineswegs nur auf die Hochkultur bezieht), was zur Entstehung einer besonderen Lebensqualität geführt hat.

Düsseldorf and Cologne are today two [...] equally weighty cities. [...] In a historical comparison, Düsseldorf has achieved the greater economic performance over the past three centuries. Cologne, on the other hand, has been able to preserve its historically grown cultural character (whereby "cultural" by no means refers only to high culture), which has led to the emergence of a special quality of life.

— Clemens von Looz-Corswarem

Horst A. Wessel (a native of Bonn who worked first in Cologne and then in Düsseldorf) in turn sums up the differences and their consequences:

Düsseldorf ist feiner und abgehobener, Köln volkstümlicher, gemütlicher. Was die beiden Städte, die in erster Linie ‚rheinisch‘ sind, unterscheidet, das sind hauptsächlich ihre historisch geprägten Eigenheiten und vor allem Geschichte. Darauf ist die Identifikation und das Selbstbewusstsein ihrer Einwohner gegründet – und daraus erwächst auch ein guter Teil ihrer ‚Rivalität‘. Im Übrigen ist man pragmatisch genug, dann zusammenzuarbeiten, wenn es dem gemeinsamen Nutzen dient, hingegen dann den Spannungsbogen aufzubauen, wenn es die Selbstfindungskräfte stärkt, ohne dem anderen wirklich weh zu tun [...]

Düsseldorf is more refined and aloof, Cologne more folksy, cosier. What distinguishes the two cities, which are primarily 'Rhenish', are mainly their historically shaped peculiarities and above all history. The identification and self-confidence of their inhabitants is based on this - and a good part of their 'rivalry' also arises from this. Incidentally, one is pragmatic enough to cooperate when it serves the common good, on the other hand to build up tension when it strengthens the forces of self-discovery without really hurting the other [...]

— Horst A. Wessel

== Literature ==
- Annette Fimpeler (Hrsg.): Düsseldorf Köln. Eine gepflegte Rivalität. Greven Verlag, Köln 2012, ISBN 978-3-7743-0488-8
- Jens Prüss: Düsseldorf vs. Köln. Köln vs. Düsseldorf. Droste Verlag, Düsseldorf 2010, ISBN 978-3-7700-1391-3
- Horst A. Wessel: Kölner Senf und Düsseldorfer Wasser. Wettbewerb der rheinischen Nachbarn. Heft 3 der Schriftenreihe des Schifffahrt-Museums Düsseldorf. Published by "Verein der Freunde und Förderer des SchifffahrtMuseums im Schlossturm e. V.", Düsseldorf 2013.
