= German American Conference at Harvard =

Student-led conference in the United States

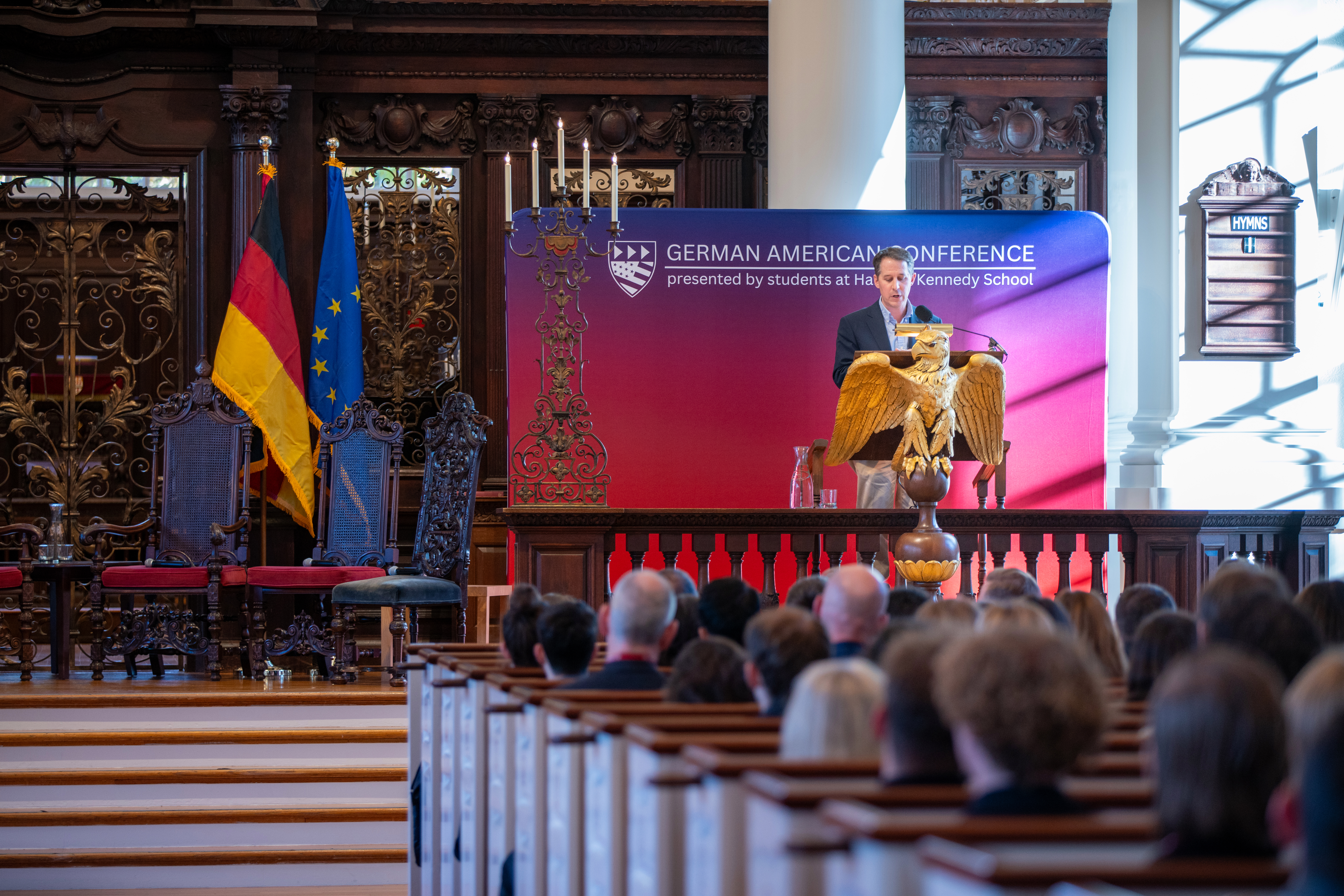
German American Conference at Harvard 2015

The German American Conference at Harvard (GAC) is a student-led conference organized on a yearly basis since 2008. The conference brings together American and German leaders from business, politics, and academia with students. By building a community of aspiring and established leaders in the United States and Germany, the conference aims at bettering transatlantic relations.

According to the German newspaper Handelsblatt the German American conference has developed into an important "transatlantic summit".

Until 2014, the conference was called German Conference at Harvard.

== List of conferences ==
Year	Theme	Dates	Co-Chairs
2008	Germany in the Modern World	12 April	
2009	Division and Unity	19-20 February	
2010	Addressing Global Challenges: Directions for a New Decade	19-20 February	
2011	Future	18-19 February	
2012	Decidedly Indecisive? The German Angst of Leadership	17-18 February	
2013	The End of the West as we Know It?	15-16 February	
2014	The US and Germany: Drifting Apart?	14-15 February	
2015	Germany and the U.S.: Building Our Future	30-31 October	
2017	Connecting Future Generations	7-9 April	
2018	In Our Own Hands	5-7 October	Rahel Dette; Rajib Mondal
2019	Breaking Barriers	1-3 November	Katharina Hoebel; Philipp Simons
2020	Neustart	October - November (Virtual Event Series)	Tim Menke; Katharina Hoebel
2021	The Future of Problem Solving	21-24 October	Reimar Weissbach
2022	If not now, when?	28-30 October	Maike Sieben; Cecile Meier-Scherling; Linn Bieske
2023	Think Beyond	27-29 October	Liudmyla Kurnosikova; Sebastian Berns; Kai Krautter; Sebastian Degner; Anita Shanker; Peter Horowitz
2024	Hard Conversations	15-17 November	Lukas Manske; Thilo Kerkhoff; Stephanie Armbruster
2025	(Transatlantic Partnership at a) Crossroads	14-16 November	Karlotta Garinet; Michael Gritzbach; Johannes Magdowski
2026	Rethinking Transatlanticism	09-11 October	Sandrina Murphy, Emma Buelte, Jeremias Thiel

There was no conference in 2016 because the conference date was moved from fall 2016 to spring 2017.

== Innovation Lounge ==
Since 2015, the German American Conference at Harvard features "Innovation Lounge", where Participants are given the chance to interact with Startups, think tanks and industry leaders from both sides of the Atlantic.

== Former speakers ==
(selection)

- Norbert Lammert, former president of the German Bundestag
- Frank-Walter Steinmeier, former Vice-Chancellor and Federal Minister of Foreign Affairs
- Sigmar Gabriel, former Federal Minister of Economic Affairs and Energy of Germany
- Wolfgang Schmidt, Federal Minister for Special Affairs, Head of the Chancellery
- Ursula von der Leyen, president of the European Commission, former German Federal Minister of Defense
- Friedrich Merz, Chancellor of Germany
- Yves Leterme, Secretary-General of the International Institute for Democracy and Electoral Assistance, former Prime Minister of Belgium
- Wolfgang Ischinger, chairman of the Munich Security Conference
- General Wesley Clark
- Robert Zoellick, 11th president of the World Bank
- General Michael Hayden, former director of CIA and NSA
- Frank Mattern, director of McKinsey & Company and global head of recruiting
- Miriam Meckel, chief editor at WirtschaftsWoche
- Thomas Gottschalk, German TV host and entertainer
- Peter Wittig, German ambassador to the U.S.
- Ska Keller, vice-president and spokesperson for migration of the Green Group in the European Parliament
- Ingo Zamperoni, former U.S. correspondent of ARD and ARD news anchor
- Kai Diekmann, former chief editor at BILD
- Ranga Yogeshwar, German TV host and scientist
- Claudia Kemfert, head of the department of energy, transportation and environment at the German Institute for Economic Research in Berlin / DIW Berlin
- Stephan Gemkow, CEO Franz Haniel & Cie. GmbH
- Michael Hüther, director of the German Economic Institute and prominent economist
- Ambassador Wendy Sherman, Deputy Secretary of State (Biden Administration)
- Ambassador Katherine Tai, United States Trade Representative (Biden Administration)
- Governor Eric Holcomb, 51st Governor of Indiana, USA
- Hazel Brugger, Swiss American German comedian, satirist, writer, and former “heute-show” correspondent
- Heidi Reichinnek, German politician, Member of the Bundestag and leader of Die Linke

== Related formats ==
- German British Conference at Oxford (GBC): Starting 2026, several GAC alumni have initiated a new conference at the University of Oxford and Saïd Business School. This conference takes inspiration from the German American Conference, as well as other global professional gatherings, to bring German and British students, young professionals, politicians, and experts closer together and build bonds between both countries' societies.
