= Anke Brunn =

German economist and politician

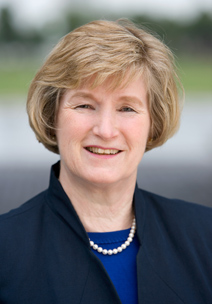

Anke Brunn (born September 17, 1942) is a German economist and politician (SPD).

== Life ==
Brunn was born in Behlendorf, Herzogtum Lauenburg. After graduating from a humanistic high school in Hamburg in 1961, she studied economics and social sciences at universities in Hamburg, Paris and Cologne, graduated in 1966 with a degree in economics and worked from 1966 to 1975 as a research assistant and research assistant at the computer center of the University of Cologne.

Brunn is married to the historian Gerhard Brunn.

== Party ==
Brunn joined the SPD in 1967, was chair of the SPD Middle Rhine district from 1987 to 1999, and was a member of the SPD party executive from 1986 to 1999. In September 2000, she ran for the office of Lord Mayor of the city of Cologne, but was defeated by Fritz Schramma (CDU). In March 2001, she was elected deputy chairwoman of the Cologne SPD sub-district. In the 2009 local elections, she ran for Cologne Council.

== Member of Parliament ==
She was a member of the Landtag of North Rhine-Westphalia from July 26, 1970, to January 28, 1981, and from 1985 to 2010. There she was deputy chairwoman of the SPD parliamentary group in the state parliament from 1979 to 1981.

From 1981 to 1983, she was a member of the Berlin House of Representatives, during which time she was deputy chairwoman of the SPD parliamentary group.

== Public offices and honorary posts ==
Brunn held office from January to June 1981 as Senator for Youth, Family and Sport in the Senate of Berlin under Regenting Mayor Hans-Jochen Vogel (SPD).

From June 5, 1985, to June 9, 1998, she was North Rhine-Westphalia's Minister for Science and Research in the government of Johannes Rau.

Brunn is chairwoman of the supervisory board of KölnMusik GmbH and was chairwoman of the Gesellschaft für Zeitgenössischen Tanz NRW from 2001 to 2014.

== See also ==
Senat Vogel – Kabinett Rau III – Kabinett Rau IV – Kabinett Rau V

== Literature ==
- Werner Breunig, Andreas Herbst (ed.): Biografisches Handbuch der Berliner Abgeordneten 1963–1995 und Stadtverordneten 1990/1991 (= Schriftenreihe des Landesarchivs Berlin. Volume 19). Berlin State Archives, Berlin 2016, ISBN 978-3-9803303-5-0, p. 107.
