= List of German states by imports =

The following is a list of German states by their total imports based on data from the Federal Statistical Office of Germany.

== List ==
German states by imports, January–July 2024
Rank	State	Import value (€ billion)	Share of total German imports	Change (vs January–July 2023)
1	North Rhine-Westphalia	166.5	21.3%	▼ −3.4%
2	Bavaria	136.2	17.4%	▼ −4.5%
3	Baden-Württemberg	130.8	16.7%	▼ −4.6%
4	Lower Saxony	71.2	9.1%	▼ −11.0%
5	Hesse	68.8	8.8%	▼ −6.2%
6	Hamburg	41.7	5.3%	▼ −6.2%
7	Rhineland-Palatinate	26.7	3.4%	▼ −4.6%
8	Saxony	20.7	2.6%	▼ −5.2%
9	Schleswig-Holstein	19.5	2.5%	▼ −4.2%
10	Saxony-Anhalt	15.2	1.9%	▲ +7.5%
11	Brandenburg	15.0	1.9%	▲ +0.4%
12	Berlin	11.7	1.5%	▼ −1.3%
13	Saarland	11.0	1.4%	▲ +6.3%
14	Thuringia	10.6	1.4%	▼ −8.3%
15	Bremen	10.5	1.3%	▼ −3.9%
16	Mecklenburg-Vorpommern	5.3	0.7%	▼ −4.3%

== See also ==
- List of German states by exports
