= List of German states by exports =

This is a list of German states by exports as of 2022 according to the Federal Statistical Office of Germany.

The sum of the state's exports is significantly lower than Germany's total export value. This difference results from goods originating from federal states of origin, returned goods, and goods with unidentified states of origin.

== List ==
List of German states by exports in 2022
States	Exports (mil. EUR€)	Share of GDP (%)	Exports per capita (EUR€)
Germany	1,575,739	40.7%	18,699
Baden-Württemberg	262,969	45.9%	23,339
North Rhine-Westphalia	233,690	29.4%	12,895
Bavaria	216,162	30.2%	16,191
Lower Saxony	97,476	28.7%	11,977
Hesse	79,502	24.6%	12,453
Rhineland-Palatinate	60,807	35.4%	14,624
Saxony	52,732	36.0%	12,910
Hamburg	51,723	35.9%	27,437
Schleswig-Holstein	28,287	25.1%	9,577
Saxony-Anhalt	23,925	31.7%	10,931
Bremen	21,347	55.2%	31,312
Saarland	16,666	43.3%	16,799
Thuringia	17,760	24.9%	8,353
Brandenburg	17,665	19.9%	6,867
Berlin	16,409	9.1%	4,393
Mecklenburg-Vorpommern	9,792	18.3%	6,008

== See also ==
- List of German states by imports
