= List of German states by patent applications =

The following is a list of German states by their number of patent applications according to figures from the German Patent and Trade Mark Office.

== List ==
German states by patent applications in 2025
State	Applications	Share of German total (%)	Per 100,000 inhabitants
Baden-Württemberg	15,161	35.8	135
Bavaria	12,575	29.7	95
Berlin	462	1.1	13
Brandenburg	217	0.5	8
Bremen	120	0.3	17
Hamburg	684	1.6	37
Hesse	1,114	2.6	18
Mecklenburg-Vorpommern	111	0.3	7
Lower Saxony	3,765	8.9	47
North Rhine-Westphalia	5,701	13.5	32
Rhineland-Palatinate	673	1.6	16
Saarland	109	0.3	11
Saxony	568	1.3	14
Saxony-Anhalt	173	0.4	8
Schleswig-Holstein	406	1.0	14
Thuringia	510	1.2	24
Germany	42,349	100	51
