= Fritz Schramma =

German politician (1947–2026)

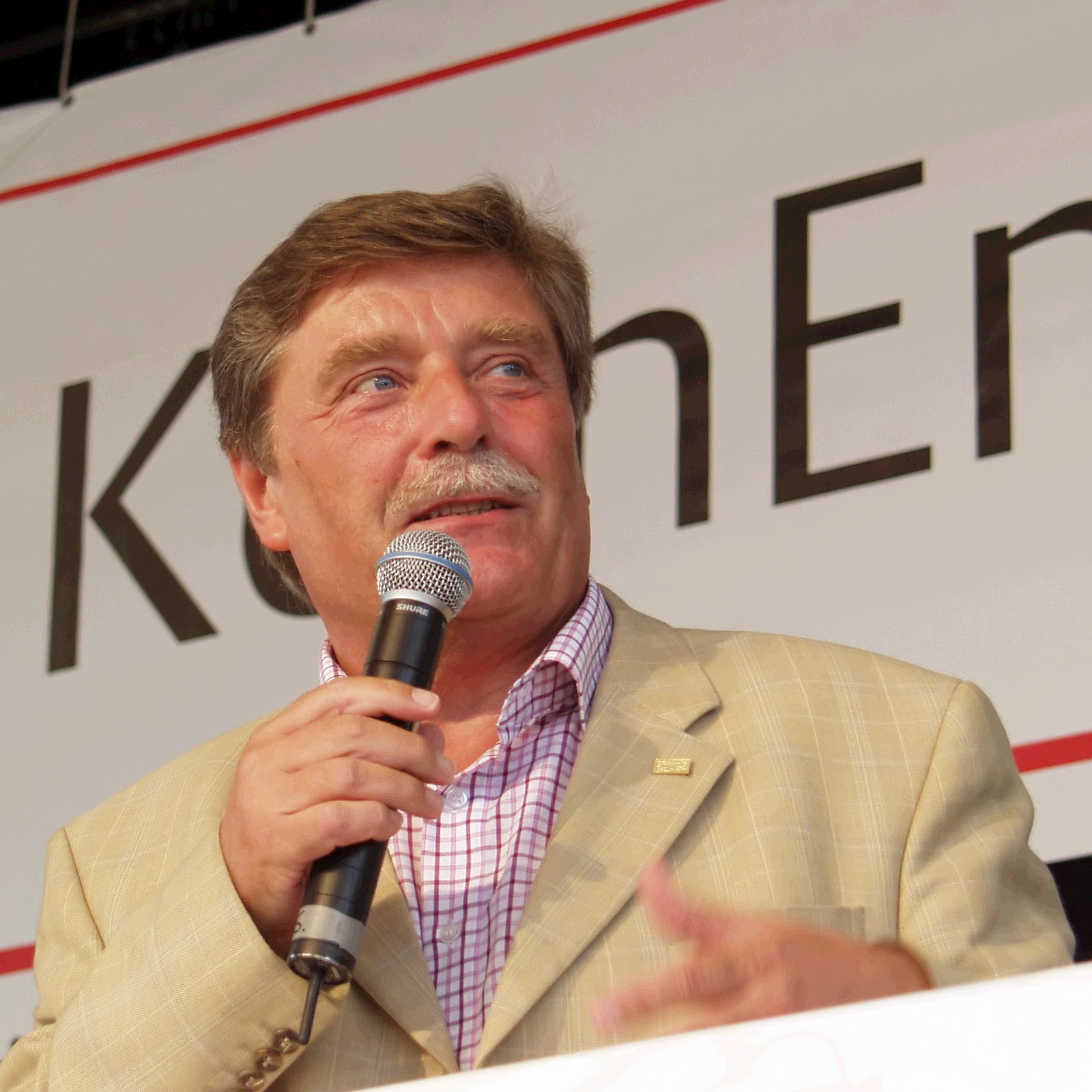
- Schramma in 2007
- Born: 27 August 1947; Cologne, North Rhine-Westphalia, Allied-occupied Germany
- Died: 17 August 2026 (aged 78)
- Education: University of Cologne
- Occupation: Politician
- Political party: CDU
- Awards: Order of Merit of North Rhine-Westphalia (2018)

Fritz Schramma (27 August 1947 – 17 August 2026) was a German politician who served as mayor of Cologne from 2000 until 2009.

== Life and career ==
In 2000, Schramma (CDU) assumed office as mayor-in-chief along with Bernhard Wimmer (CDU), because the incumbent Harry Blum (CDU) died unexpectedly. In a runoff vote, he won election on 17 September 2000 against Anke Brunn (Social Democrats), who was nominated by her party only a short time ahead of the vote. The Social Democrats were heavily weakened by corruption scandals. Schramma's term in office was nine years instead of the usual five: he first completed the term of his predecessor Blum until 2004, and then he served his own term as a result of winning the runoff in 2000.

In 2025, after 50 years of membership, Schramma left the Christian Democratic Union, stating the lack of profile within the party as reason.

Schramma died from cancer on 17 August 2026, at the age of 78.
