= Michael Hüther =

German economist

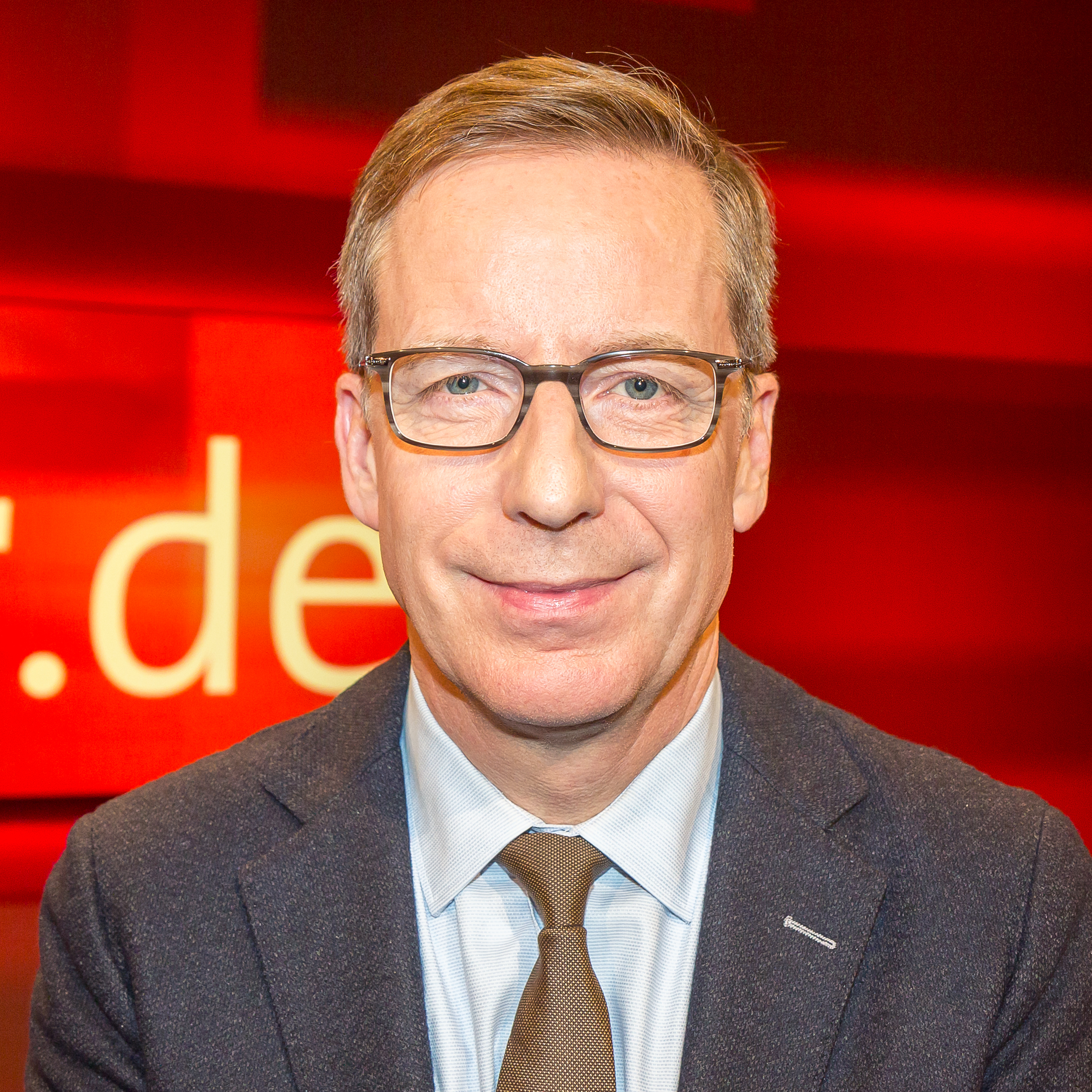
- Hüther in December 2017
- Born: 24 April 1962 (age 64); Düsseldorf, Northrhine-Westphalia

Academic background
- Education: University of Giessen
- Influences: Walter Eucken

Academic work
- Discipline: Macroeconomics; Finance
- School or tradition: Freiburg school
- Institutions: Institut der deutschen Wirtschaft

Michael Hüther (born April 24, 1962) is a German economist who currently serves as director of the Institut der deutschen Wirtschaft. He has previously been the chief economist of DekaBank. Hüther also is an honorary professor at the European Business School International University Schloss Reichartshausen.

== Education ==
Hüther received his doctoral degree in economics from the University of Giessen in 1990 and also studied at the University of East Anglia.

== Career ==
From 1990 to 1999, Hüther was a research assistant for the German Council of Economic Experts. Since 2004 he serves as director of the IW.

In April 2020, Hüther was appointed by Minister-President Armin Laschet of North Rhine-Westphalia to a 12-member expert group to advise on economic and social consequences of the COVID-19 pandemic in Germany.

== Other activities (selection) ==
=== Corporate boards ===
- TÜV Rheinland, chairman of the supervisory board (since 2019)
- Allianz Global Investors, member of the European supervisory board
- Deutsche Bank, member of the advisory board (since 2017)
- TÜV Rheinland Berlin Brandenburg Pfalz, member of the board of directors (since 2016)
- Fraport, member of the economic advisory board

=== Non-profit organizations ===
- Federation of German Industries (BDI), member of the presidium (2017–2018)
- Wirtschaftsrat der CDU, member of the scientific advisory board
- Free Democratic Party (FDP), member of the business forum
- Association of Private Higher Education Institutions (VPH), member of the board of trustees
- Atlantik-Brücke, member of the board
- Foundation of German Industry (SDW), member of the board of trustees (since 2013)
- German Institute of Development and Sustainability (IDOS), member of the board of trustees
- Research Center for International and Interdisciplinary Theology (FIIT) at the Heidelberg University, member of the advisory board (since 2010)
- Max Planck Institute for the Study of Societies (MPIfG), member of the board of trustees (since 2009)
- Herbert Giersch Stiftung, member of the advisory board
- Institute for Banking and Financial History (IBF), member of the board of trustees
- Friedrich and Isabel Vogel Foundation, member of the board of trustees (since 2005

=== Editorial boards ===
- Wirtschaftsdienst, Member of the Scientific Advisory Board
