= German Economic Institute =

Liberal economic think tank In Cologne, Germany

- Institut der deutschen Wirtschaft Köln e.V.
- Abbreviation: IW
- Formation: 1951 (75 years ago)
- Type: Think Tank
- Legal status: Registered Association (e.V.)
- Headquarters: Cologne, Germany
- Location: Cologne, Berlin, both Germany, Brussels, Belgium
- Website: www.iwkoeln.de/en/

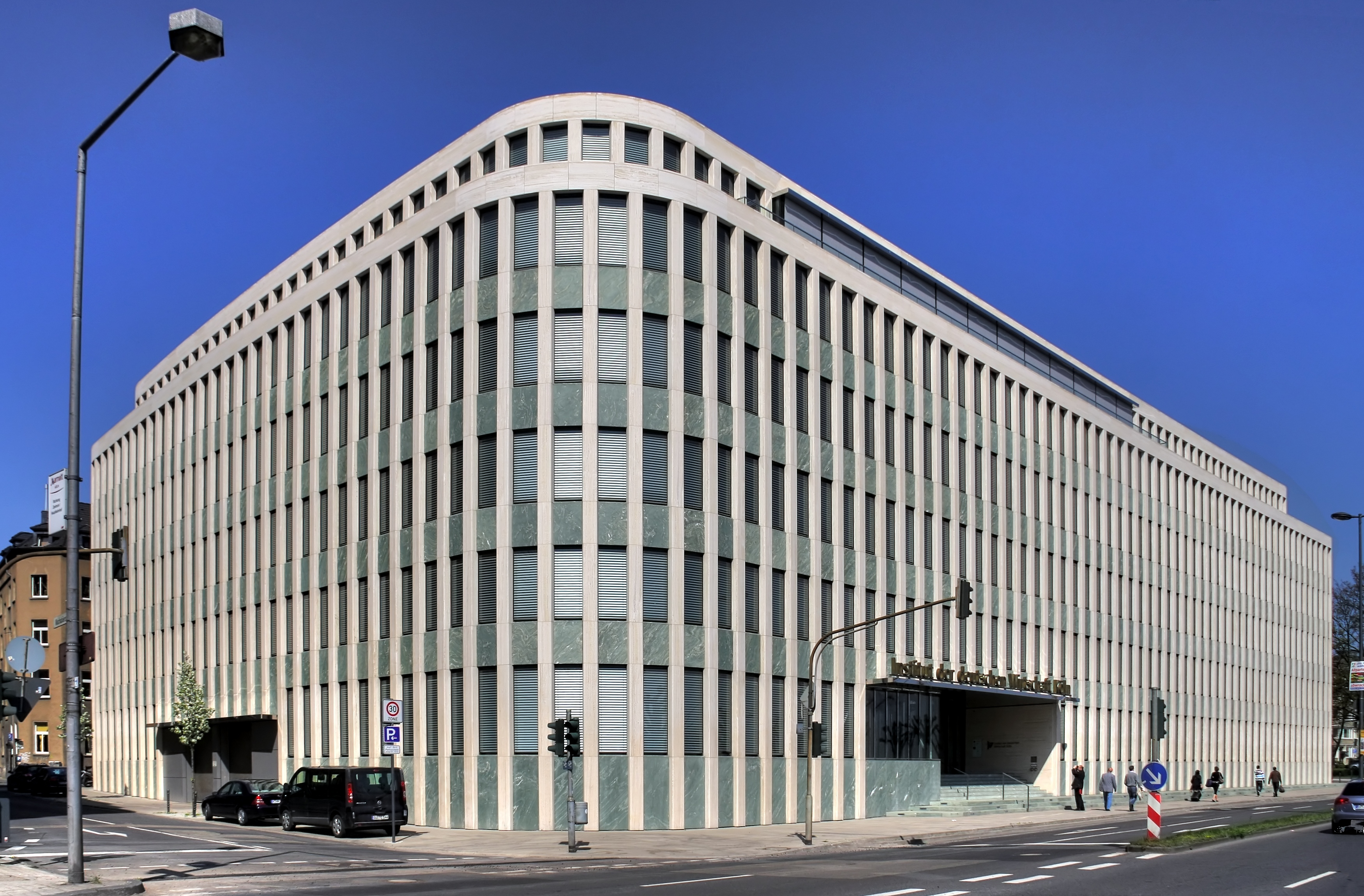
Cologne Institute for Economic Research Headquarters in Cologne, Germany

The German Economic Institute (German: Institut der deutschen Wirtschaft Köln e.V.; IW) is a private economic research institute in Germany, which promotes an economic liberal order. The German Economic Institute is based in Cologne, Germany, with additional offices in Berlin, Germany, and Brussels, Belgium. It is the research institute of the Association of Industrial Companies.

The IW compiles analyses on economic and social policy issues. As a think tank, it combines research, consultancy and communication services. IW director is Michael Hüther.

== History ==
The institute was founded in 1951 under the auspices of the Confederation of German Employers' Associations (BDA) and the Federation of German Industries (BDI) as German Industrial Institute (Deutsches Industrieinstitut) in Cologne. From 1951 to 1953 the journalist Otto Mejer (DNB) and Fritz Hellwig (CDU) were managing director of the newly founded institute. DI became later the DIW. The German Economic Institute is a registered association (e.V.). Its membership consists of some 110 German business and employers' associations as well as a number of individual companies. Membership fees finance the regular scientific research and advocacy. Additionally, the institute conducts research projects and carries out numerous studies financed by third parties, such as public institutions, foundations and businesses.

== IW Group and Governance Structures ==
The German Economic Institute has four subsidiaries which together constitute the IW Group. The Group is composed of the core research department (IW Research), a commercial research consultancy (IW Consult), a publishing house (IW Medien), the German operator of the Junior Achievement Programme (IW Junior) and an academy (IW Akademie). Through the organization's decision-making bodies members contribute to the institute's general orientation without having any specific influence on the contents of conducts research and the subsidiaries’ daily business. The annual general meeting of the executive board of the German Economic Institute elected Arndt Günter Kirchhoff, CEO of KIRCHHOFF Holding GmbH & Co. KG, as its honorary president.

=== IW Research ===
Michael Hüther is the director of the German Economic Institute and head of its management board. The management board consists of the director, the deputy director, Hans-Peter Fröhlich and the heads of research, Hubertus Bardt and Hans-Peter Klös.

The Berlin Office is led by Knut Bergmann and the Brussels Office by Sandra Parthie.

The institute's research department itself is subdivided into eleven research units.

==== Research Units ====
- Labour Market - main focus on employment and unemployment, working conditions and personnel policy.
- Vocational qualification and specialists – Vocational training, further education, securing skilled personnel and international VET/PET research
- Vocational Rehabilitation and Inclusion - information resources for maximising the potential of workers with disabilities
- Education, Migration and Innovation – examining how education and migration contribute to securing a skilled workforce.
- Financial and Real Estate Markets – monitoring and researching the economic significance of the finance and real estate markets
- International Economics and Economic Outlook – promoting open markets and sensible business regulation at the European and global levels as well as analyzing the business cycle, economic growth and globalisation and provide advice for policymakers and business associations
- Public Finance, Social Security Systems, Income and Wealth Distribution – investigating the fiscal consequences of public policy and analysing the incentive effects for companies and private households
- Structural Change and Competition – monitoring corporate activity in a constantly changing market environment
- Wage Policy and Industrial Relations – pay and industrial relations issues including policy, corporate codetermination, the process of the wage finding and the roles of the parties involved
- Environment, Energy, Infrastructure – examining the effects of economic activity on the environment and the effects of environmental and energy policy on business
- Behavioral Economics and Business Ethics – investigating the influence of institutions such as values, standards, rules and laws on the state, society, business and individuals

==== Cross Functional Research Groups ====
Additionally to the eleven research units there are two cross functional research groups staffed by researchers working on the following two issues:

- Big Data Analytics
- Macroeconomic Analysis and Forecast
- Microdata and Method Development

=== IW Consult ===
The IW Consult carries out research, development and knowledge-transfer projects in cooperation with companies, employers' associations, government ministries, foundations and other institutions. IW Consult also runs the office of “ecl@ss”, a digital product standard.

=== IW Medien ===
Institut der deutschen Wirtschaft Köln Medien GmbH (IW Media), the media arm of the German Economic Institute (IW), provides publicity-oriented packaging of economic information. The weekly newsletter, Informationsdienst des Instituts der deutschen Wirtschaft Köln (iwd), carries articles on economics, society, and social policy, as well as analyses and economic data.

=== IW Junior ===
The Institut der deutschen Wirtschaft Köln JUNIOR gGmbH is the German operator of the Junior Achievement Programme. It gives school students practical insights into the world of commerce based on the concept of ”learning by doing”.

=== IW Akademie ===
The IW Akademie (IW Academy) conducts seminars in the field of executive education based on its research. The aim is to demonstrate how potential conflicts between the profit motive and personal conscience can be resolved. Additionally, the IW Academy offers a Master's programme "Behavioral Ethics, Economics and Psychology (M.A.)" in collaboration with the University of Cologne, the Cologne University of Applied Sciences and Bonn-Rhine-Sieg University.

== Brussels Office ==
The IW's EU-Office located in Brussels was established in July 2015. It conducts research on European Union monetary policy, environmental issues, structural change and other aspects of the EU.
