= Schnarrenberg =

Schnarrenberg may refer to:

- Schnarrenberg (Tübingen), a mountain of Baden-Württemberg, Germany
- Schnarrenberg (Stuttgart), a mountain of Baden-Württemberg, Germany
