= Schnarrenberg (Stuttgart) =

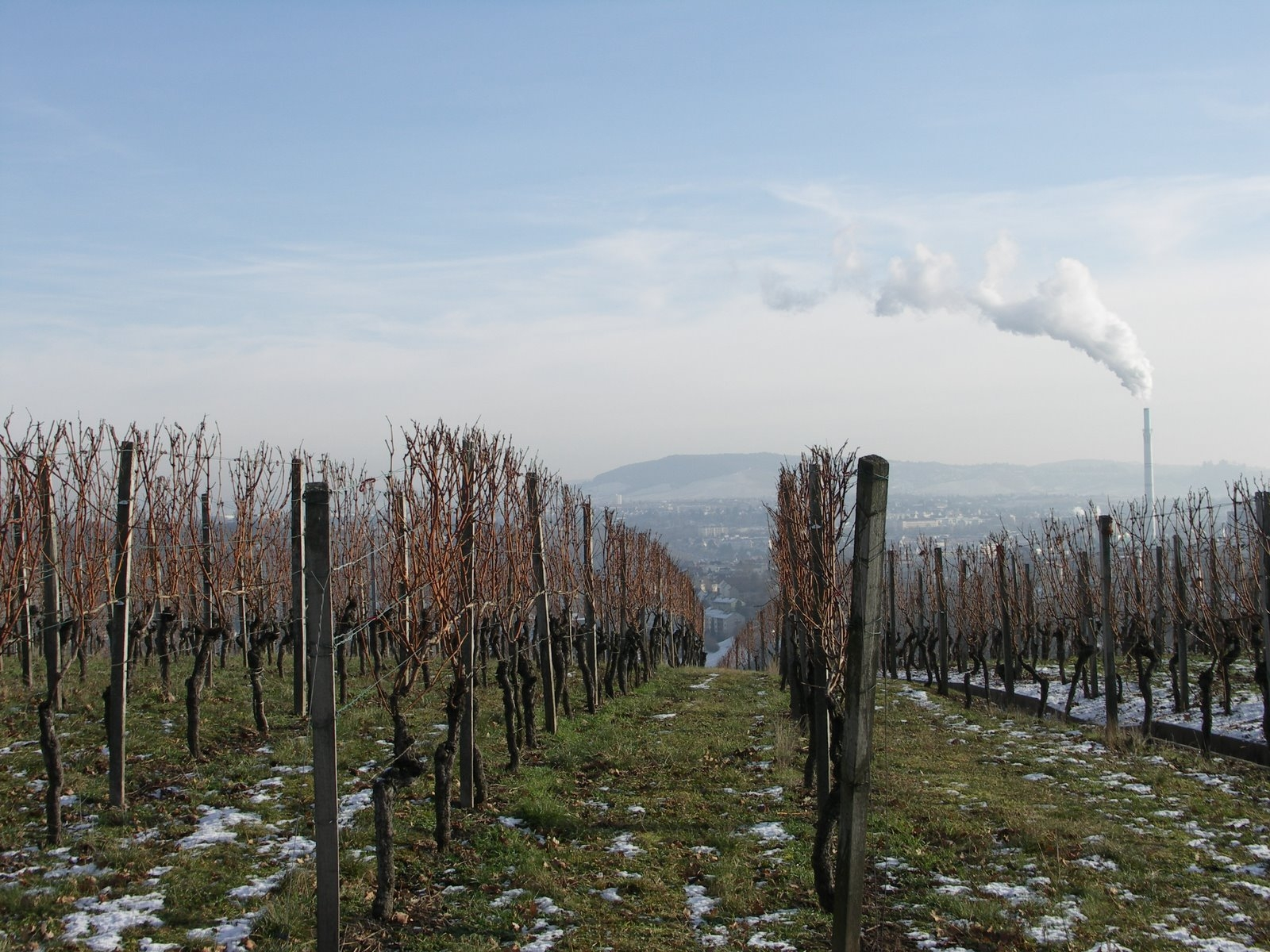

Highest point
- Elevation: 316 m (1,037 ft)
- Coordinates: 48°49′44″N 9°12′15″E

Geography
- Location within Baden-Württemberg
- Location: Baden-Württemberg, Germany

Schnarrenberg is a mountain of Baden-Württemberg, Germany.

The Schnarrenberg is a hill ridge in the north of Stuttgart in the quarters of Münster and Zuffenhausen. The majority is on the territory of Münster. At its highest point (316 m above sea level (NN)) is the Stuttgart Weather Office, a branch of the German Weather Service. Its slopes are covered by vineyards.

== Schnarrenberg Tunnel ==
By Schnarrenberg, is the 272-metre-long Schnarrenberg railway tunnel. This double-tracked, electrified freight bypass line connects of the Stuttgart-Untertürkheim with Kornwestheim. The tunnel was built in 1895 and overhauled from 1999 to 2000; its brick masonry being replaced by a concrete shell.

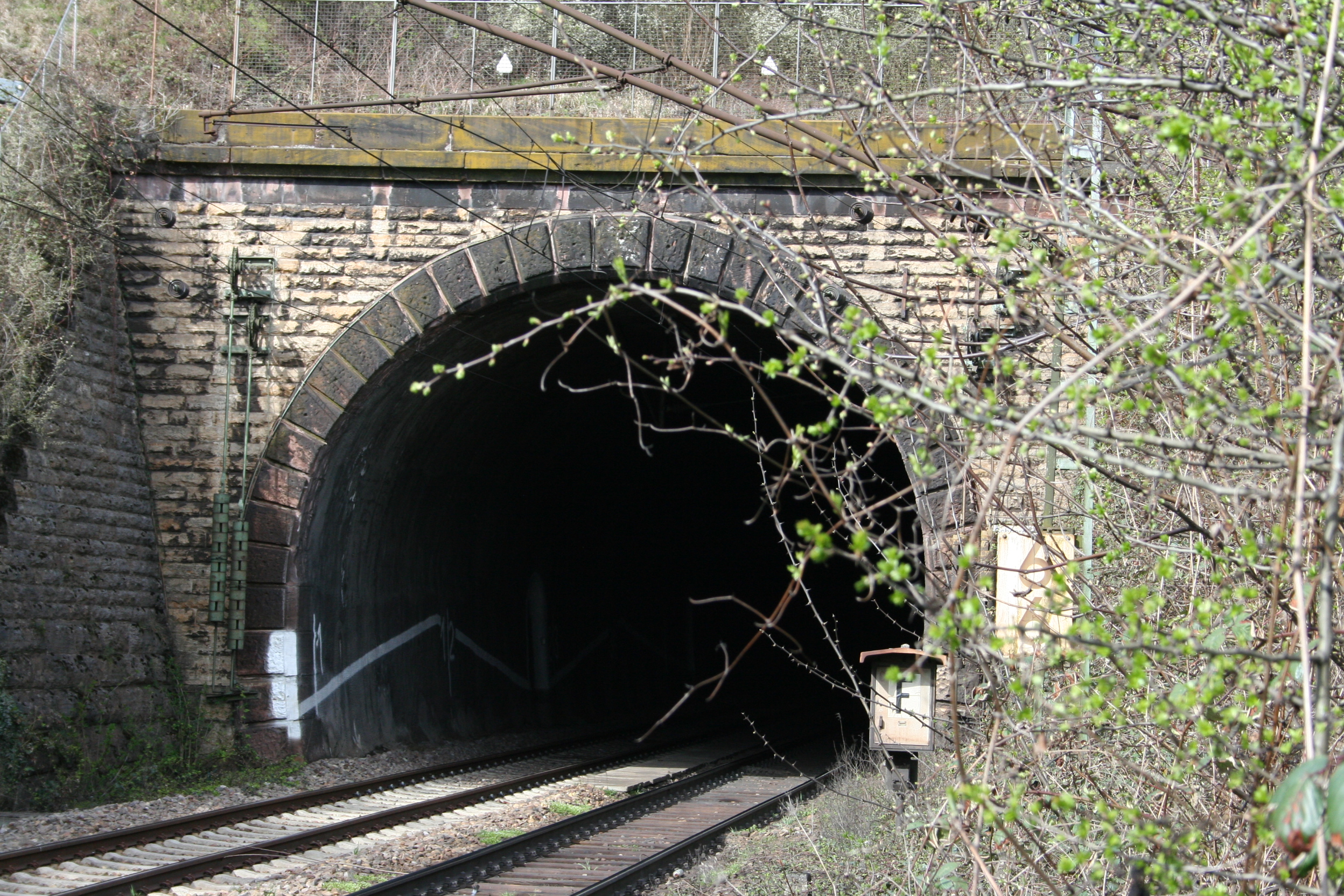
The Schnarrenberg Tunnel
