= United States =

Country primarily in North America

United States of America
- Flag Coat of arms
- Motto: "In God We Trust" Other traditional mottos: E pluribus unum (Latin) "Out of many, one"; Annuit cœptis (Latin) "Providence favors our undertakings"; Novus ordo seclorum (Latin) "New order of the ages"
- Anthem: "The Star-Spangled Banner"
- Seal

- Capital: Washington, D.C. (Note: D.C. stands for District of Columbia, the formal name of the U.S. federal district.); 38°53′N 77°1′W
- Largest city: New York City (Note: Officially New York but commonly called New York City to avoid confusion with the state of the same name); 40°43′N 74°0′W
- Official languages: English (Note: Per Executive Order 14224. States and territories variously recognize English only, English plus one or more local languages, or no language at all. See § Language. The U.S. Congress has never passed legislation designating an official language at the federal level, and the U.S. Constitution does not specify an official language.)
- Ethnic groups (2020): By race: 61.6% White; 12.4% Black; 6% Asian; 1.1% Native American; 0.2% Pacific Islander; 10.2% two or more races; 8.4% other; By origin: 81.3% non-Hispanic or Latino; 18.7% Hispanic or Latino
- Religion (2025): 65% Christianity; 32% Protestantism; 20% Catholicism; 12% other Christian; 1% Mormonism; 24% unaffiliated; 2% Judaism; 6% other religion; 3% unanswered
- Demonym: American (Note: The historical and informal demonym Yankee has been applied to Americans, New Englanders, and northeasterners since the 18th century. Other terms, such as Usonian, are rare. For all lesser used terms, see Demonyms for the United States.)
- Government: Federal presidential republic
  - President: Donald Trump
  - Vice President: JD Vance
  - House Speaker: Mike Johnson
  - Chief Justice: John Roberts
- Legislature: Congress
  - Upper house: Senate
  - Lower house: House of Representatives

Independence from Great Britain
  - Declaration: July 4, 1776; 250 years ago
  - Confederation: March 1, 1781
  - Recognition: September 3, 1783
  - Constitution: March 4, 1789

Area
  - Total area: 3,796,742 sq mi (9,833,520 km^{2}) (Note: At 3,531,900 sq mi (9,147,590 km^{2}), the United States is the third-largest country in the world by land area, behind Russia and China. By total area (land and water), it is the third-largest, behind Russia and Canada, if its coastal and territorial water areas are included. However, if only its internal waters are included (bays, sounds, rivers, lakes, and the Great Lakes), the U.S. ranks fourth, after Russia, Canada, and China. Coastal/territorial waters included: 3,796,742 sq mi (9,833,517 km^{2}) Only internal waters included: 3,696,100 sq mi (9,572,900 km^{2})) (4th)
  - Water (%): 7.0 (2010)
  - Land area: 3,531,905 sq mi (9,147,590 km^{2}) (3rd)

Population
  - 2025 estimate: ▲341,784,857
  - 2020 census: ▲331,449,281 (Note: This figure excludes Puerto Rico and the other unincorporated islands because they are counted separately in U.S. census statistics.) (3rd)
  - Density: 96.8/sq mi (37.4/km^{2}) (180th)
- GDP (PPP): 2026 estimate
  - Total: ▲$32.642 trillion (Note: U.S. nominal and PPP-adjusted GDP are the same as the U.S. is the reference country for PPP calculations.) (2nd)
  - Per capita: ▲$95,212 (10th)
- GDP (nominal): 2026 estimate
  - Total: ▲$32.642 trillion (1st)
  - Per capita: ▲$95,212 (8th)
- Gini (2024): ▲41.8 (Note: After adjustment for taxes and transfers) medium inequality
- HDI (2023): ▲0.938 very high (17th)
- Currency: U.S. dollar ($) (USD)
- Time zone: UTC−4 to −12, +10, +11
  - Summer (DST): UTC−4 to −10 (Note: See Time in the United States for details about laws governing time zones in the United States.)
- Date format: mm/dd/yyyy (Note: See Date and time notation in the United States.)
- Calling code: +1
- ISO 3166 code: US
- Internet TLD: .us

The United States of America (USA), also known as the United States (U.S.) or America, is a country primarily located in North America. It is a federal republic consisting of 50 states and a federal capital district, Washington, D.C. The 48 contiguous states border Canada to the north and Mexico to the south, with the semi-exclave of Alaska in the northwest and the archipelago of Hawaii in the Pacific Ocean. The United States also asserts sovereignty over five major island territories and various uninhabited islands in Oceania and the Caribbean. (Note: The five major territories outside the union of states are American Samoa, Guam, the Northern Mariana Islands, Puerto Rico, and the U.S. Virgin Islands. The seven undisputed island areas without permanent populations are Baker Island, Howland Island, Jarvis Island, Johnston Atoll, Kingman Reef, Midway Atoll, and Palmyra Atoll. U.S. sovereignty over the unpopulated Bajo Nuevo Bank, Navassa Island, Serranilla Bank, and Wake Island is disputed.) It has the world's fourth-largest total area (Note: The United States' world ranking by total area depends on how the country's area is measured. See List of countries and dependencies by area for information. The following two primary sources represent the range of estimates for the total areas of China and the United States: 1. The Encyclopædia Britannica lists China as the third-largest country (after Russia and Canada), with a total area of 3,696,100 sq mi (9,572,900 km^{2}).; 2. The CIA World Factbook lists China as the fourth-largest country (after Russia, Canada and the United States), with a total area of 3,705,410 sq mi (9,596,960 km^{2}).; Both sources exclude Taiwan as well as Chinese coastal and territorial waters from China's total. However, the CIA World Factbook includes U.S. coastal and territorial waters, while Encyclopædia Britannica excludes them. Britannica specifies the United States' area (excluding coastal and territorial waters) as 3,677,649 sq mi (9,525,067 km^{2}), which is less than either source's figure for China.) and third-largest population, exceeding 341 million. (Note: The U.S. Census Bureau's latest official population estimate of 341,784,857 residents (2025) is for the 50 states and the District of Columbia; it excludes the 3.6 million residents of the five major U.S. territories and outlying islands. The Census Bureau also provides a continuously updated but unofficial population clock: www.census.gov/popclock.)

Paleo-Indians migrated from North Asia to North America at least 15,000 years ago and formed various civilizations. Beginning in 1607, British colonization established the Thirteen Colonies. The 18th-century American Enlightenment spread values of republicanism and liberalism there, and clashes with the British Crown over taxation without parliamentary representation, among other denied rights, sparked the American Revolution. Independence from Great Britain was formally declared in the Lee Resolution of July 2, 1776, two days before the Declaration of Independence. Victory in the 1775–1783 Revolutionary War confirmed international recognition of U.S. sovereignty.

The U.S. expanded westward through the purchase, settlement, and conquest of European- and Indigenous-controlled territory. As more states joined the Union, a sectional division over slavery led 11 Southern states to declare secession and form the Confederate States of America, fighting the Union in the Civil War of 1861–1865. With the United States' victory and reunification, slavery was abolished. By 1900, the U.S. emerged as a great power, a status solidified after its involvement in World War I. Following Japan's attack on Pearl Harbor in 1941, it entered World War II on the Allied side. The war's aftermath left the U.S. and the Soviet Union as rival superpowers, vying for geopolitical dominance during the Cold War. The Soviet Union's collapse in 1991 left the U.S. as the world's sole superpower, although it has faced competition from China in the 2020s.

The U.S. federal government is a republic under the Constitution, which created a separation of powers among legislative, executive, and judicial branches. Executive authority is vested in a president, while Congress is a bicameral national legislature composed of the House of Representatives (a lower house based on population) and the Senate (an upper house based on equal representation for each state). The Supreme Court exercises judicial review, under which it may hold laws or governmental actions unconstitutional. Federalism grants substantial autonomy to the 50 states.

A developed country, the United States ranks high in economic competitiveness, innovation, and higher education. Its economy accounts for over a quarter of nominal global GDP and has been the world's largest since about 1890. The U.S. is the wealthiest country, with the highest disposable household income per capita among OECD members, though its wealth inequality is highly pronounced. American culture, shaped by centuries of immigration, is diverse and globally influential. The U.S. makes up nearly a third of global military spending and is widely considered to have the most powerful armed forces in the world. A member of numerous international organizations, it plays a dominant role in global political, cultural, economic, and military affairs.

== Etymology ==
Documented use of the phrase "United States of America" dates back to January 2, 1776. On that day, Stephen Moylan, a Continental Army aide to General George Washington, wrote a letter to Joseph Reed, an aide-de-camp to Washington, seeking to go "with full and ample powers from the United States of America to Spain" to seek assistance in the Revolutionary War effort. The first known public usage is an anonymous essay published in the Williamsburg newspaper The Virginia Gazette on April 6, 1776. Sometime on or after June 11, 1776, Thomas Jefferson wrote "United States of America" in a rough draft of the Declaration of Independence, which was adopted by the Second Continental Congress on July 4, 1776.

The term "United States" and its initialism "U.S.", used as nouns or as adjectives in English, are common short names for the country. The initialism "USA", a noun, is also common. "United States" and "U.S." are the established terms throughout the U.S. federal government, with prescribed rules. (Note: The official U.S. Government Publishing Office Style Manual has prescribed specific usages for "U.S." and "United States" as part of official names. In "formal writing (treaties, Executive orders, proclamations, etc.); congressional bills; legal citations and courtwork; and covers and title pages", "United States" is always used. In a sentence containing the name of another country, "United States" must be used. Otherwise, "U.S." is used preceding a government organization or as an adjective, but "United States" is used as an adjective preceding non-governmental organizations (e.g. United States Steel Corporation).) "The States" is an established colloquial shortening of the name, used particularly from abroad; "stateside" is the corresponding adjective or adverb.

"America" is the feminine form of the first name of Americus Vesputius, the Latinized name of Italian explorer Amerigo Vespucci (1454–1512); (Note: "Americus", which is derived from the Old High German first name "Emmerich") it was first used as a place name by the German cartographers Martin Waldseemüller and Matthias Ringmann in 1507. (Note: Americus comes from the Medieval Latin name Emericus (for Saint Emeric of Hungary), itself derived from the Old High German name Emmerich.) Vespucci proposed that the West Indies discovered by Christopher Columbus in 1492 were part of a previously unknown landmass and not among the Indies at the eastern limit of Asia. In English, the term "America" (used without a qualifier) seldom refers to topics unrelated to the United States. "The Americas" is the general term to describe the totality of the continents of North and South America.

== History ==
=== Indigenous peoples ===
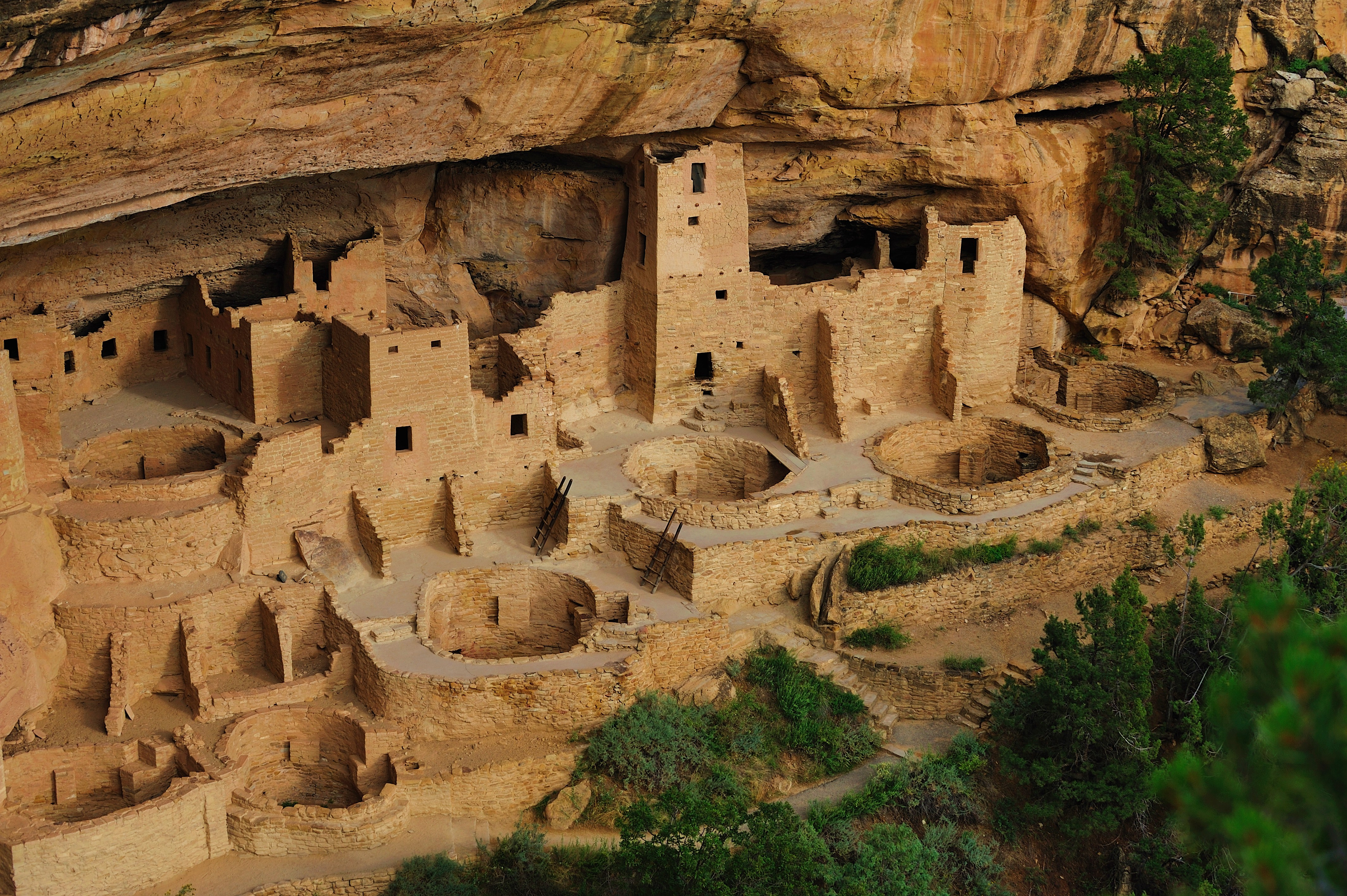
Cliff Palace, a settlement of ancestors of the Native American Pueblo peoples in present-day Montezuma County, Colorado, built between c. 1200 and 1275

The first inhabitants of North America migrated from Siberia at least 15,000 years ago, either across the Bering land bridge or along the now-submerged Ice Age coastline. The Clovis culture, which appeared around 11,000 BCE in North America, is believed to be the first widespread culture in the Americas. Over time, Indigenous North American cultures grew increasingly sophisticated, and some, such as the Mississippian culture, developed agriculture, architecture, and complex societies. In the post-archaic period, the Mississippian cultures were located in the midwestern, eastern, and southern regions, and the Algonquian in the Great Lakes region and along the Eastern Seaboard, while the Hohokam culture and Ancestral Puebloans inhabited the Southwest. Native population estimates of what is now the United States before the arrival of European colonizers range from around 500,000 to nearly 10 million. In 2024, an estimated 3.43 million people in the United States identified as American Indian or Alaska Native alone (thus, identifying with no other racial category) and represented approximately 1% of the U.S. population. An additional 5.68 million people identified as American Indian or Alaska Native in combination with one or more other races, bringing the total of those identifying as American Indian or Alaska Native to approximately 9.11 million.

=== European exploration, colonization and conflict (1513–1765) ===
The colonial possessions of Britain (the Thirteen Colonies in pink and others in purple), France (in blue), and Spain (in orange) in North America, 1750

Christopher Columbus began exploring the Caribbean for Spain in 1492, leading to Spanish-speaking settlements and missions from what are now Puerto Rico and Florida to New Mexico and California. The first Spanish colony in the present-day continental United States was Spanish Florida, chartered in 1513. After several settlements failed there due to starvation and disease, Spain's first permanent town, Saint Augustine, was founded in 1565.

France established its own settlements in French Florida in 1562, but they were either abandoned (Charlesfort, 1563) or destroyed by Spanish raids (Fort Caroline, 1565). Permanent French settlements were founded much later along the Great Lakes (Fort Detroit, 1701), the Mississippi River (St. Louis, 1764) and especially the Gulf of Mexico (New Orleans, 1718). Early European colonies also included the thriving Dutch colony of New Nederland (settled 1626, present-day New York) and the small Swedish colony of New Sweden (settled 1638 in what became Delaware). British colonization of the East Coast began with the Virginia Colony (1607) and the Plymouth Colony (Massachusetts, 1620).

The Mayflower Compact in Massachusetts and the Fundamental Orders of Connecticut established precedents for local representative self-governance and constitutionalism that would develop throughout the American colonies. While European settlers in what is now the United States experienced conflicts with Native Americans, they also engaged in trade, exchanging European tools for food and animal pelts. (Note: From the late 15th century, the Columbian exchange had been catastrophic for native populations throughout the Americas. It is estimated that up to 95 percent of the Indigenous populations, especially in the Caribbean, perished from infectious diseases during the years following European colonization; remaining populations were often displaced by European expansion.) Relations ranged from close cooperation to warfare and massacres. The colonial authorities often pursued policies that forced Native Americans to adopt European lifestyles, including conversion to Christianity. Along the eastern seaboard, settlers trafficked Africans through the Atlantic slave trade, largely to provide manual labor on plantations.

The original Thirteen Colonies (Note: New Hampshire, Massachusetts, Connecticut, Rhode Island, New York, New Jersey, Pennsylvania, Delaware, Maryland, Virginia, North Carolina, South Carolina, and Georgia) that would later found the United States were administered as possessions of the British Empire by Crown-appointed governors, though local governments held elections open to most white male property owners. The colonial population grew rapidly from Maine to Georgia, eclipsing Native American populations; by the 1770s, the natural increase of the population was such that only a small minority of Americans had been born overseas. The colonies' distance from Britain facilitated the entrenchment of self-governance, and the First Great Awakening, a series of Christian revivals, fueled colonial interest in guaranteed religious liberty.

=== American Revolution and the early republic (1765–1800) ===
The Declaration of Independence portrait depicts the Committee of Five presenting the Declaration to the Continental Congress on June 28, 1776, in Philadelphia.

Following its victory in the French and Indian War, Britain began to assert greater control over local affairs in the Thirteen Colonies, resulting in growing political resistance. One of the primary grievances of the colonists was the denial of their rights as Englishmen, particularly the right to representation in the British government that taxed them. To demonstrate their dissatisfaction and resolve, the First Continental Congress met in 1774 and passed the Continental Association, a colonial boycott of British goods enforced by local "committees of safety" that proved effective. The British attempt to then disarm the colonists resulted in the 1775 Battles of Lexington and Concord, igniting the American Revolutionary War. At the Second Continental Congress, the colonies appointed George Washington Commander-in-Chief of the Continental Army, and created a committee that named Thomas Jefferson to draft the Declaration of Independence. Two days after the Second Continental Congress passed the Lee Resolution to create an independent, sovereign nation, the Declaration was adopted on July 4, 1776. The political values of the American Revolution evolved from an armed rebellion demanding reform within an empire to a revolution that created a new social and governing system founded on the defense of liberty and the protection of inalienable natural rights; equality under the law; sovereignty of the people; republicanism over monarchy, aristocracy, and other hereditary political power; civic virtue; and an intolerance of political corruption. The Founding Fathers of the United States, who included Washington, Jefferson, John Adams, Benjamin Franklin, Alexander Hamilton, John Jay, James Madison, Thomas Paine, and many others, were inspired by Classical, Renaissance, and Enlightenment philosophies and ideas.

Though in practical effect since its drafting in 1777, the Articles of Confederation were ratified in 1781 and formally established a decentralized government that operated until 1789. After the British surrender at the siege of Yorktown in 1781, American sovereignty was internationally recognized by the Treaty of Paris (1783), through which the U.S. also gained territory stretching west to the Mississippi River, north to present-day Canada, and south to Spanish Florida. The Northwest Ordinance (1787) established the precedent by which the country's territory would expand with the admission of new states, rather than the expansion of existing states.

The U.S. Constitution was drafted at the 1787 Constitutional Convention to overcome certain limitations of the Articles. It went into effect in 1789, creating a federal republic governed by three separate branches that together formed a system of checks and balances. George Washington was elected the country's first president under the Constitution, and the Bill of Rights (a series of ten amendments to the Constitution) was adopted in 1791 to allay skeptics' concerns about the power of the more centralized government. Washington's resignation as Commander-in-Chief after the Revolutionary War and his later refusal to run for a third term as the country's first president established a precedent for the supremacy of civil authority in the United States and the peaceful transfer of power.

=== Westward expansion and Civil War (1800–1865) ===
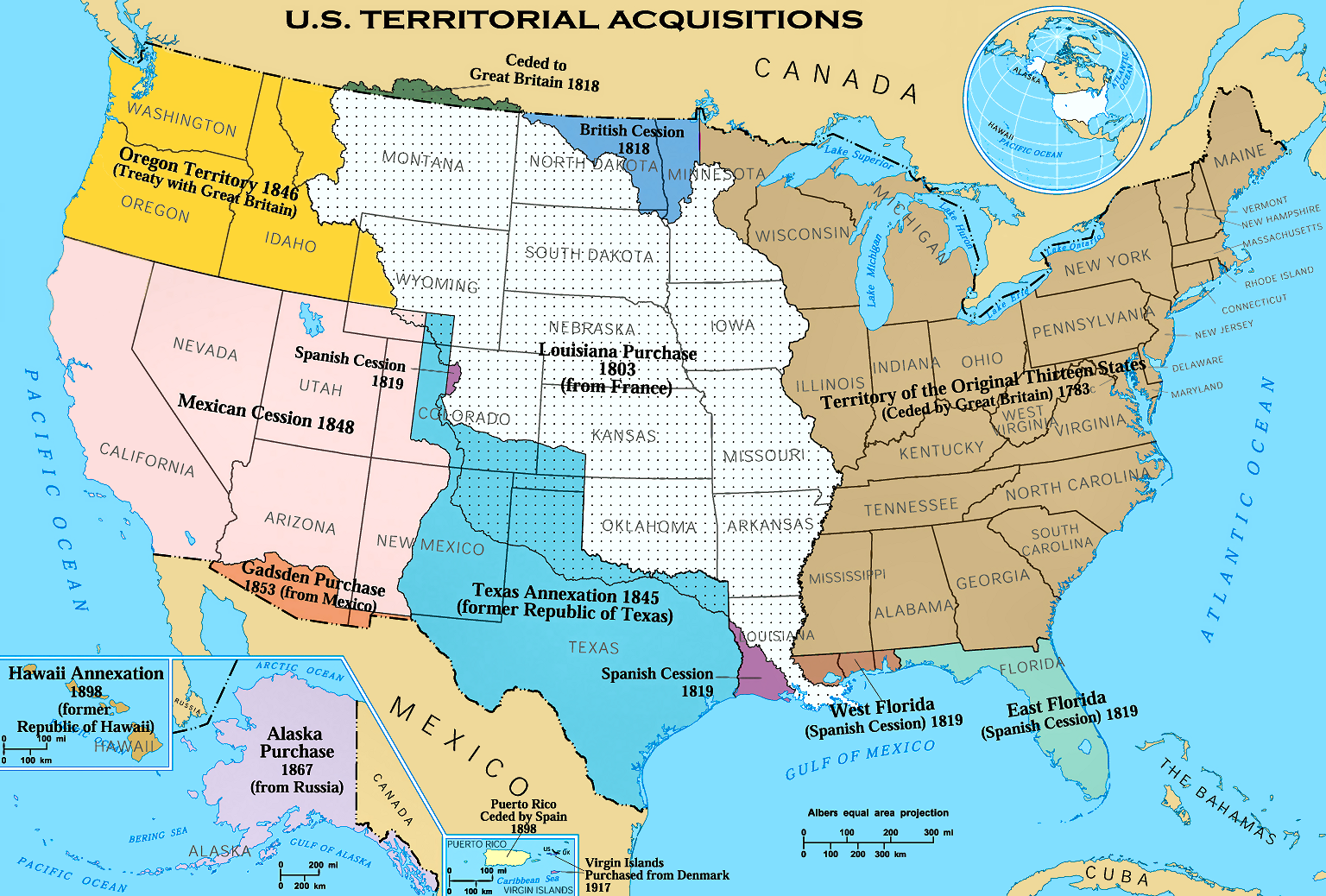
Territorial expansion of the United States

In the late 18th century, American settlers began to expand westward in larger numbers, many with a sense of manifest destiny. The Louisiana Purchase of 1803 from France nearly doubled the territory of the United States. Lingering issues with Britain remained, leading to the War of 1812, which was fought to a draw. Spain ceded Florida and its Gulf Coast territory in 1819.

The Missouri Compromise of 1820, which admitted Missouri as a slave state and Maine as a free state, attempted to balance the desire of northern states to prevent the expansion of slavery into new territories with that of southern states to extend it there. Primarily, the compromise prohibited slavery in all other lands of the Louisiana Purchase north of the 36°30′ parallel.

As Americans expanded further into territory inhabited by Native Americans, the federal government implemented policies of Indian removal or assimilation. The most significant such legislation was the Indian Removal Act of 1830, a key policy of President Andrew Jackson. It resulted in the Trail of Tears (1830–1850), in which an estimated 60,000 Native Americans living east of the Mississippi River were forcibly removed and displaced to lands far to the west, causing 13,200 to 16,700 deaths along the forced march. Settler expansion as well as this influx of Indigenous peoples from the East resulted in the American Indian Wars west of the Mississippi.

During the colonial period, slavery became legal in all the Thirteen colonies, and by 1770 it provided the main labor force in the large-scale, agriculture-dependent economies of the Southern Colonies from Maryland to Georgia. The practice began to be significantly questioned during the American Revolution, and spurred by an active abolitionist movement that had reemerged in the 1830s, states in the North enacted laws to prohibit slavery within their boundaries. At the same time, support for slavery had strengthened in Southern states, with widespread use of inventions such as the cotton gin (1793) having made slavery immensely profitable for Southern elites.

The United States annexed the Republic of Texas in 1845, and the 1846 Oregon Treaty led to U.S. control of the present-day American Northwest. Dispute with Mexico over Texas led to the Mexican–American War (1846–1848). After the victory of the U.S., Mexico recognized U.S. sovereignty over Texas, New Mexico, and California in the 1848 Mexican Cession; the cession's lands also included the future states of Nevada, Colorado and Utah. The California gold rush of 1848–1849 spurred a huge migration of white settlers to the Pacific coast, leading to even more confrontations with Native populations. One of the most violent, the California genocide of thousands of Native inhabitants, lasted into the mid-1870s. Additional western territories and states were created.

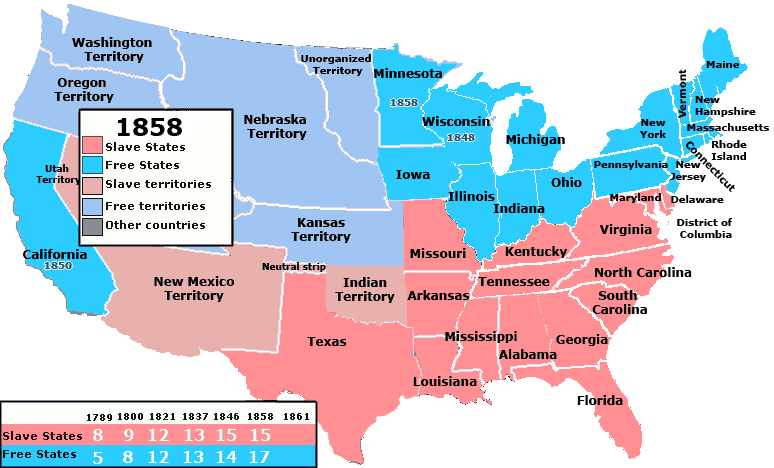
Slave states and free states in 1858

Throughout the 1850s, the sectional conflict regarding slavery was further inflamed by national legislation in the U.S. Congress and decisions of the Supreme Court. In Congress, the Fugitive Slave Act of 1850 mandated the forcible return to their enslavers in the South of persons taking refuge in non-slave states, while the Kansas–Nebraska Act of 1854 effectively gutted the anti-slavery requirements of the Missouri Compromise. In its Dred Scott decision of 1857, the Supreme Court ruled against an enslaved person brought into non-slave territory, simultaneously declaring the entire Missouri Compromise to be unconstitutional. These and other events exacerbated tensions between North and South that would culminate in the American Civil War (1861–1865).

Beginning with South Carolina, 11 slave-state governments voted to secede from the United States in 1860–1861, joining to create the Confederate States of America. All other state governments remained loyal to the Union. (Note: The Confederate States of America was formed by the following states, each state government of which formally declared its secession from the United States: South Carolina, Mississippi, Florida, Alabama, Georgia, Louisiana, Texas, Virginia, Arkansas, Tennessee, and North Carolina.) War broke out in April 1861 after the Confederacy bombarded Fort Sumter. Following the Emancipation Proclamation on January 1, 1863, many freed slaves joined the Union army. The war began to turn in the Union's favor following the 1863 Siege of Vicksburg and Battle of Gettysburg, and the Confederates surrendered in 1865 after the Union's victory in the Battle of Appomattox Court House.

=== Reconstruction, Gilded Age, and Progressive Era (1866–1917) ===
An Edison Studios film showing immigrants arriving at Ellis Island in New York Harbor, a major point of entry for European immigrants in the late 19th and early 20th centuries

Efforts toward reconstruction in the secessionist South had begun as early as 1862, but it was only after President Lincoln's assassination that the three Reconstruction Amendments to the Constitution were ratified to protect civil rights. The amendments codified nationally the abolition of slavery and involuntary servitude except as punishment for crimes, promised equal protection under the law for all persons, and prohibited denial or abridgment of voting rights on the basis of race, color, or previous enslavement. As a result, African Americans took an active political role in ex-Confederate states in the decade following the Civil War. The former Confederate states were readmitted to the Union, beginning with Tennessee in 1866 and ending with Georgia in 1870.

National infrastructure, including transcontinental telegraph and railroads, spurred growth in the American frontier. This was accelerated by the Homestead Acts, through which nearly 10 percent of the total land area of the United States was given away free to some 1.6 million homesteaders. From 1865 through 1917, an unprecedented stream of immigrants arrived in the United States, including 24.4 million from Europe. Most came through the Port of New York, as New York City and other major cities on the East Coast became home to large Jewish, Irish, and Italian populations. Many Northern Europeans as well as significant numbers of Germans and other Central Europeans moved to the Midwest. At the same time, about one million French Canadians migrated from Quebec to New England. During the Great Migration, millions of African Americans left the rural South for urban areas in the North. Alaska was purchased from Russia in 1867.

The Compromise of 1877 is generally considered the end of the Reconstruction era, as it resolved the electoral crisis following the 1876 presidential election and led President Rutherford B. Hayes to reduce the role of federal troops in the South. Immediately, the Redeemers began evicting the Carpetbaggers and quickly regained local control of Southern politics in the name of white supremacy. African Americans endured a period of heightened, overt racism following Reconstruction, a time often considered the nadir of American race relations. A series of Supreme Court decisions, including Plessy v. Ferguson, emptied the Fourteenth and Fifteenth Amendments of their force, allowing Jim Crow laws in the South to remain unchecked, sundown towns in the Midwest, and segregation in communities across the country, which would be reinforced in part by the policy of redlining later adopted by the federal Home Owners' Loan Corporation.

An explosion of technological advancement, accompanied by the exploitation of cheap immigrant labor, led to rapid economic expansion during the Gilded Age of the late 19th century. It continued into the early 20th, when the United States already outpaced the economies of Britain, France, and Germany combined. Tycoons led the nation's expansion in the railroad, petroleum, and steel industries, as the United States emerged as a pioneer of the automotive industry. This fostered the amassing of enormous economic and political power by a few prominent industrialists, largely through their formation of trusts and monopolies to prevent open competition. This resulted in significant increases in economic inequality, slum conditions, and civil unrest, creating a fertile environment for labor unions to flourish and, to a more limited extent, socialist movements to emerge. This period eventually ended with the advent of the Progressive Era, which was characterized by significant economic, legislative and social reforms.

Pro-American elements in Hawaii overthrew the Hawaiian monarchy; the islands were annexed in 1898. That same year, Puerto Rico, the Philippines, and Guam were ceded to the U.S. by Spain after the latter's defeat in the Spanish–American War. (The Philippines was granted full independence from the U.S. on July 4, 1946, following World War II. Puerto Rico and Guam have remained U.S. territories.) American Samoa was acquired by the United States in 1900 after the Second Samoan Civil War. The U.S. Virgin Islands were purchased from Denmark in 1917 after Danish voters approved the sale in a 1916 referendum.

=== World War I, Great Depression, and World War II (1917–1945) ===
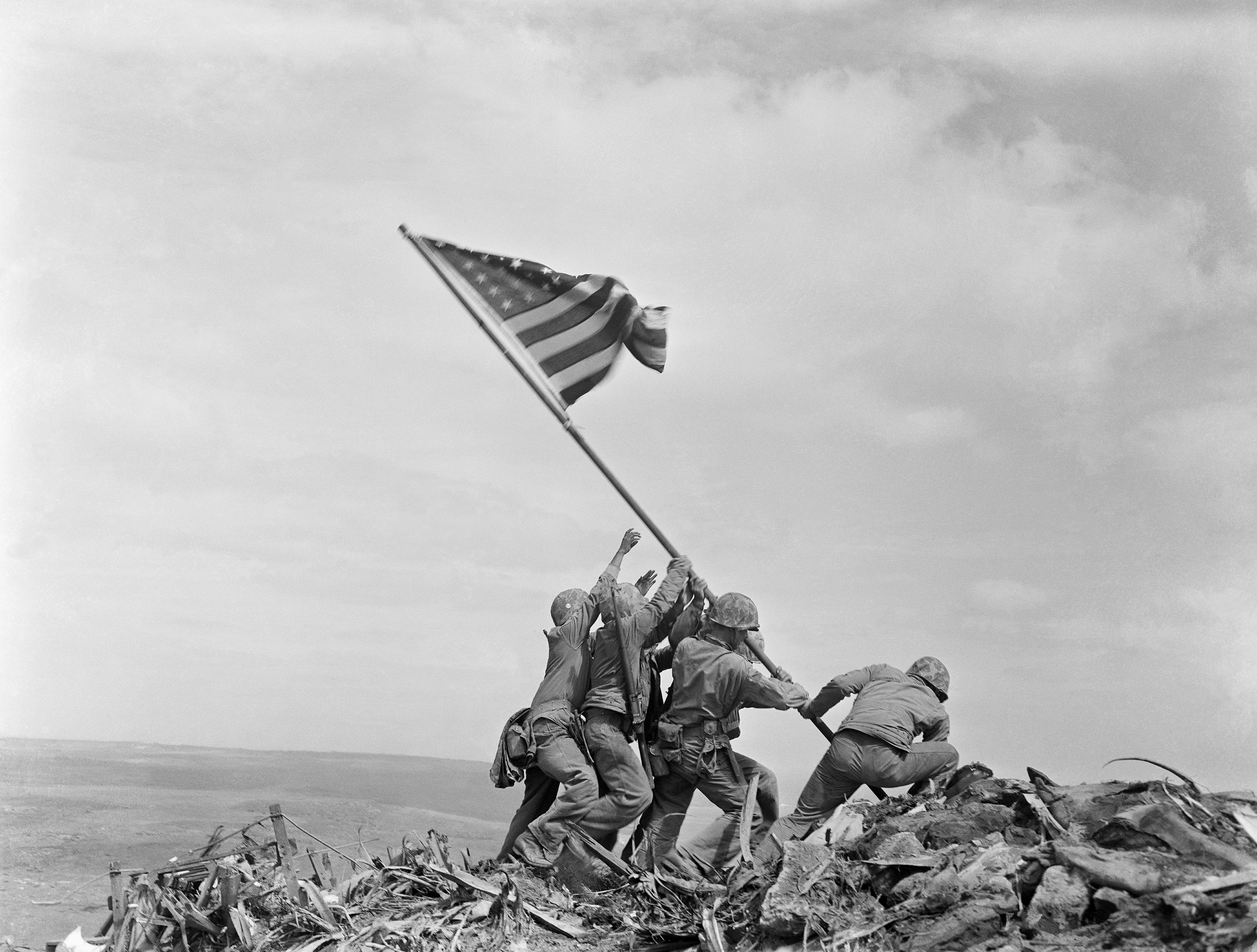
Raising the Flag on Iwo Jima (1945), depicting U.S. marines during the Battle of Iwo Jima in World War II

The United States entered World War I alongside the Allies in 1917, helping to turn the tide against the Central Powers. In 1920, a constitutional amendment granted nationwide women's suffrage. During the 1920s and 1930s, radio for mass communication and early television transformed communications nationwide. The Wall Street Crash of 1929 had triggered the Great Depression, to which President Franklin D. Roosevelt responded with the New Deal plan of "reform, recovery and relief", a series of unprecedented and sweeping recovery programs and employment relief projects combined with financial reforms and regulations. During the 1930s, severe drought and dust storms caused or exacerbated by poor agricultural practices forced hundreds of thousands of displaced families (often called "Okies" because many originated from Oklahoma) as well as entire towns and communities to migrate from the Great Plains to California in search of subsistence.

Initially neutral during World War II, the U.S. began supplying war materiel to the Allies of World War II in March 1941 and entered the war in December after Japan's attack on Pearl Harbor. Agreeing to a "Europe first" policy, the U.S. concentrated its wartime efforts on Japan's allies Italy and Germany until their final defeat in May 1945. The U.S. developed the first nuclear weapons and used them against the Japanese cities of Hiroshima and Nagasaki in August 1945, which historians consider central to the end of World War II in Asia. The United States was one of the "Big Four" allied powers during the war, alongside the United Kingdom, the Soviet Union, and China; they later became the "Four Policemen" that met to plan the postwar world. The U.S. emerged relatively unscathed from the war, with even greater economic power and international political influence.

=== Cold War and social revolution (1945–1991) ===
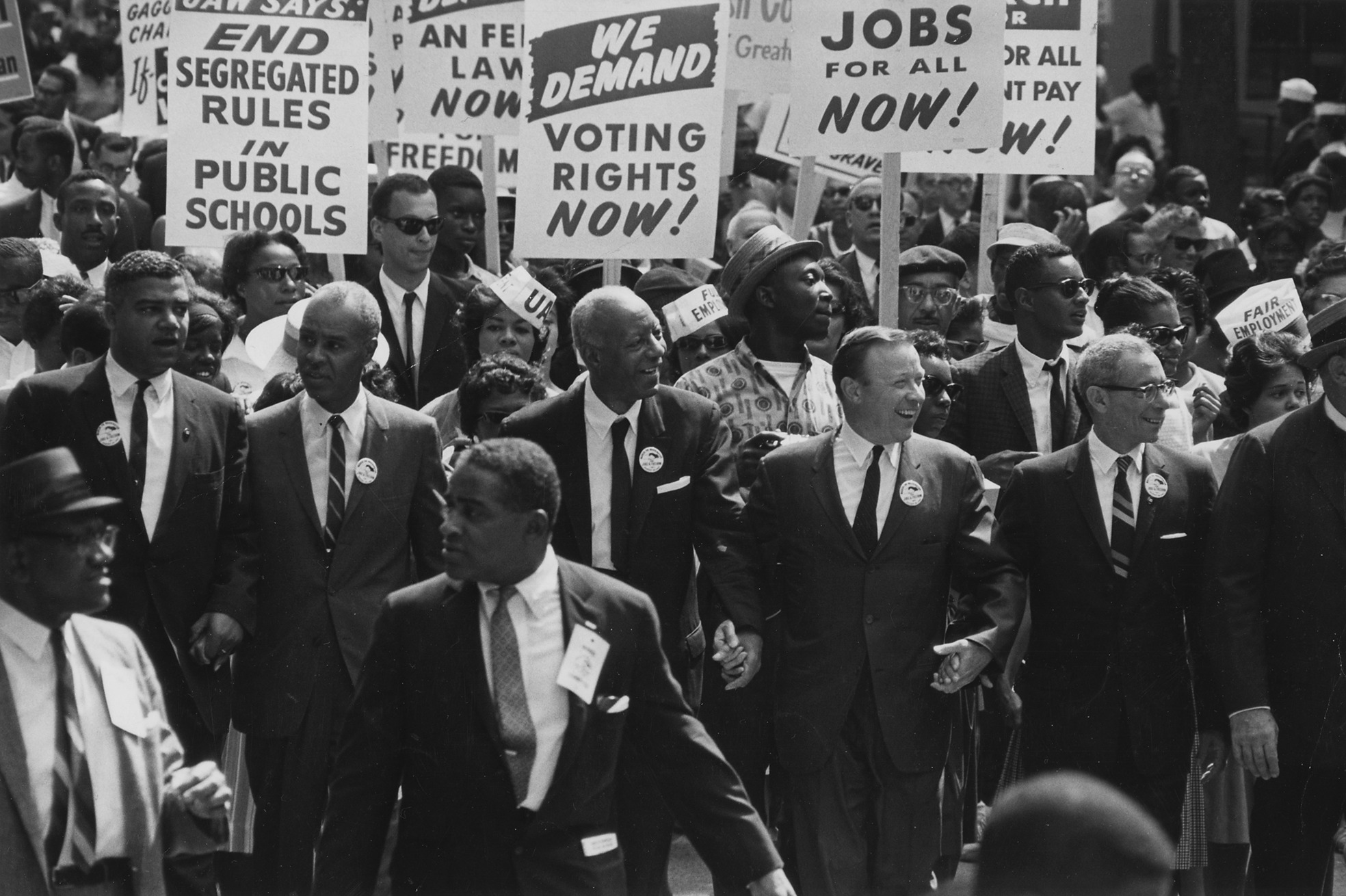
Civil rights activists during the March on Washington for Jobs and Freedom in Washington, D.C. in August 1963

The end of World War II in 1945 left the U.S. and the Soviet Union as superpowers, each with its own political, military, and economic sphere of influence. Geopolitical tensions between the two superpowers soon led to the Cold War. The Soviets' development of their own atomic weapons led to a fierce nuclear arms race with America. The U.S. implemented a policy of containment intended to limit the Soviet Union's sphere of influence; engaged in regime change against governments perceived to be aligned with the Soviets; and prevailed in the Space Race, which culminated with the first crewed Moon landing in 1969.

Domestically, the U.S. experienced drastic economic growth, urbanization, and population growth following World War II. The civil rights movement emerged, with Martin Luther King Jr. becoming a prominent leader in the early 1960s. The Great Society plan of President Lyndon B. Johnson's administration resulted in groundbreaking and broad-reaching laws, policies and a constitutional amendment to counteract some of the worst effects of lingering institutional racism.

The counterculture movement in the U.S. brought significant social changes, including the liberalization of attitudes toward recreational drug use and sexuality. It also encouraged open defiance of the military draft (leading to the end of conscription in 1973) and wide opposition to U.S. intervention in Vietnam, with the U.S. totally withdrawing in 1975. A societal shift in the roles of women was significantly responsible for the large increase in female paid labor participation starting in the 1970s, and by 1985 the majority of American women aged 16 and older were employed.

The Fall of Communism and the dissolution of the Soviet Union from 1989 to 1991 marked the end of the Cold War and left the United States as the world's sole superpower. This cemented the United States' global influence, reinforcing the concept of the "American Century" as the U.S. dominated international political, cultural, economic, and military affairs.

=== Contemporary (1991–present) ===
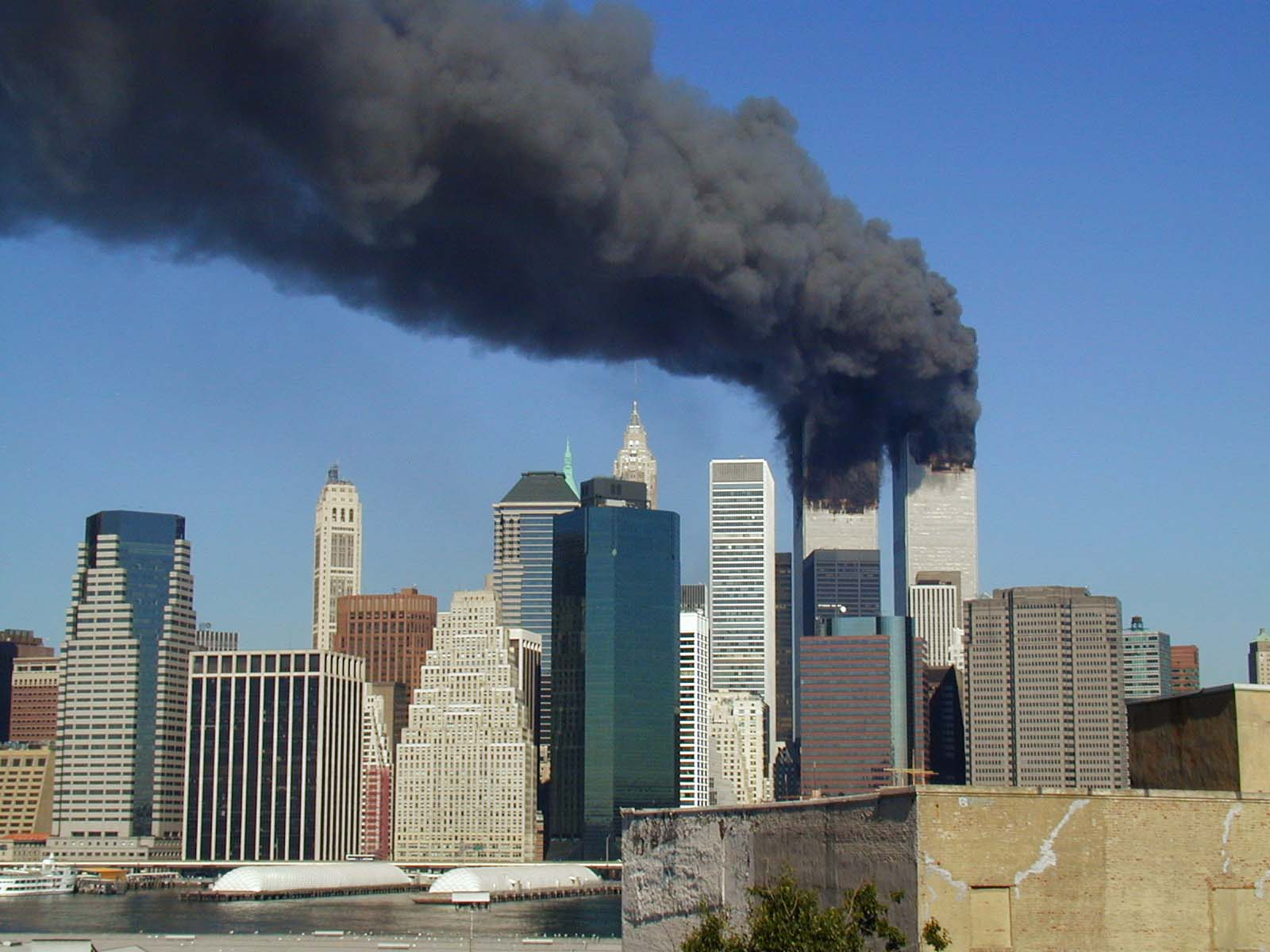
The Twin Towers in Lower Manhattan during the September 11 attacks of 2001

The 1990s saw the longest recorded economic expansion in American history up to that time, a dramatic decline in U.S. crime rates, and advances in technology. Throughout this decade, technological innovations such as the World Wide Web, the evolution of the Pentium microprocessor in accordance with Moore's law, rechargeable lithium-ion batteries, the first gene therapy trial, and cloning either emerged in the U.S. or were improved upon there. In the 1990s, the Human Genome Project was launched, while Nasdaq became the first stock market in the United States to trade online. In the Gulf War of 1991, an American-led international coalition of states expelled an Iraqi invasion force that had occupied neighboring Kuwait. The September 11 attacks on the United States in 2001 by the pan-Islamist militant organization al-Qaeda led to the U.S. launching the war on terror and military interventions in Afghanistan and Iraq. The U.S. housing bubble culminated in 2007 with the Great Recession, the largest economic contraction since the Great Depression. In 2009, Barack Obama became the first African-American president, serving two consecutive terms.

Beginning in the 2010s, the United States has experienced increased political polarization and significant democratic backsliding. The country's polarization was violently reflected in the January 2021 Capitol attack, when a mob of insurrectionists supporting President Donald Trump entered the U.S. Capitol and sought to prevent his successor from taking office. It was the first time that a U.S. president has refused the peaceful transfer of power. Some scholars have described the United States as transitioning from a liberal democratic polity to a hybrid regime since 2025. In the 2020s, academics and commentators have noted China's economic rise and its growing challenge to the U.S. as the world's sole superpower.

== Geography ==
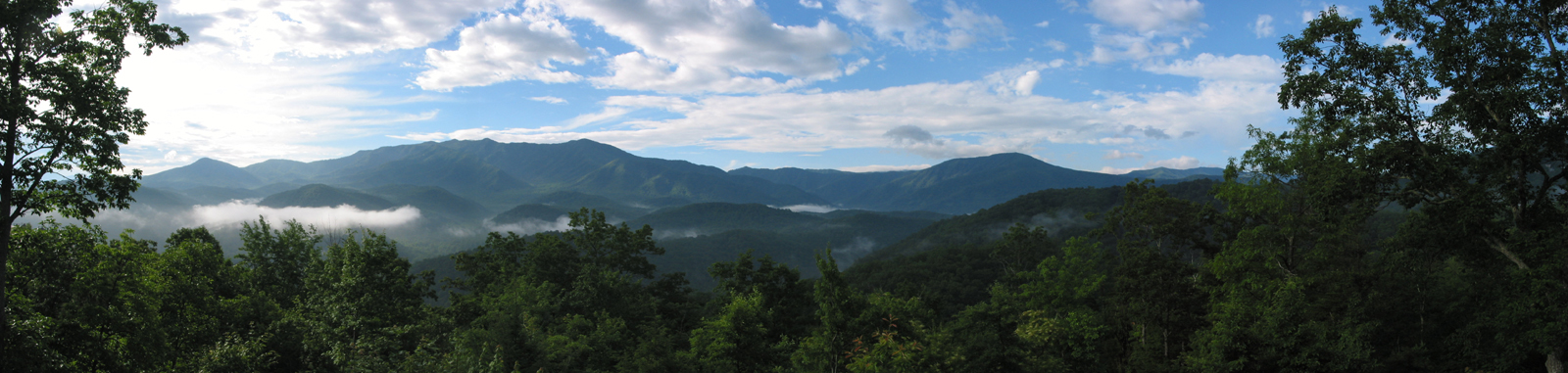
Great Smoky Mountains in Tennessee and North Carolina

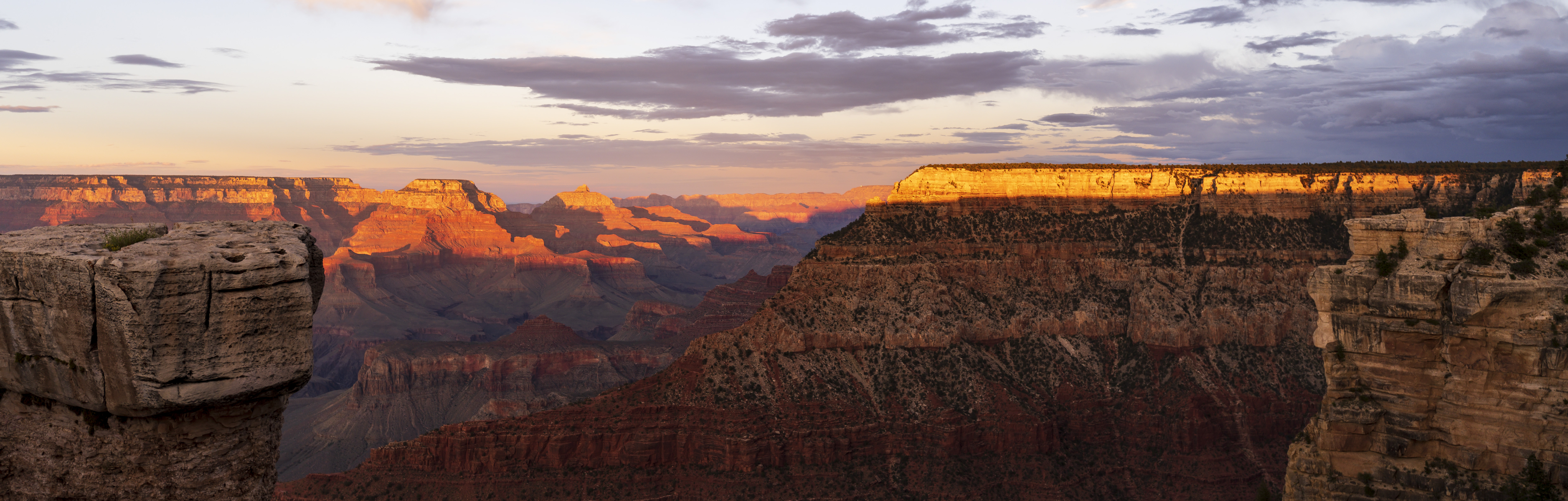
The South Rim of the Grand Canyon, Arizona

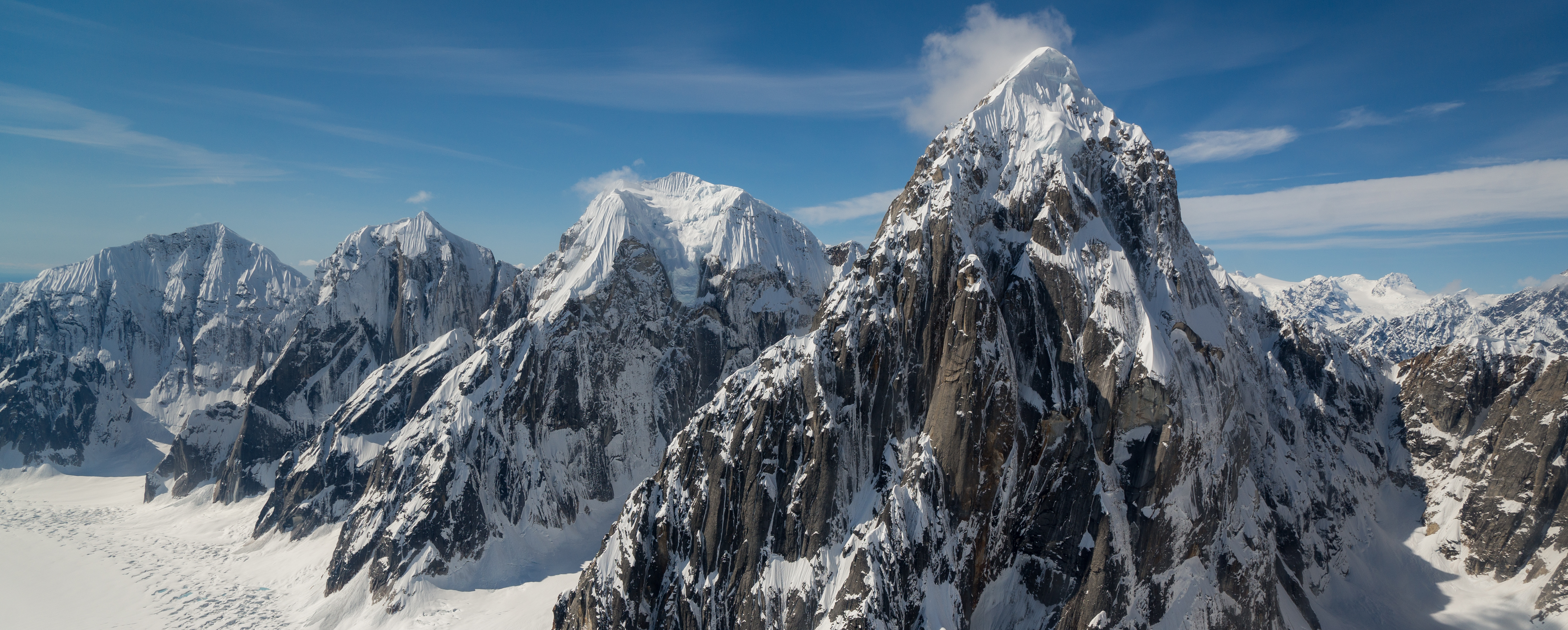
Mountains in Denali National Park, Alaska

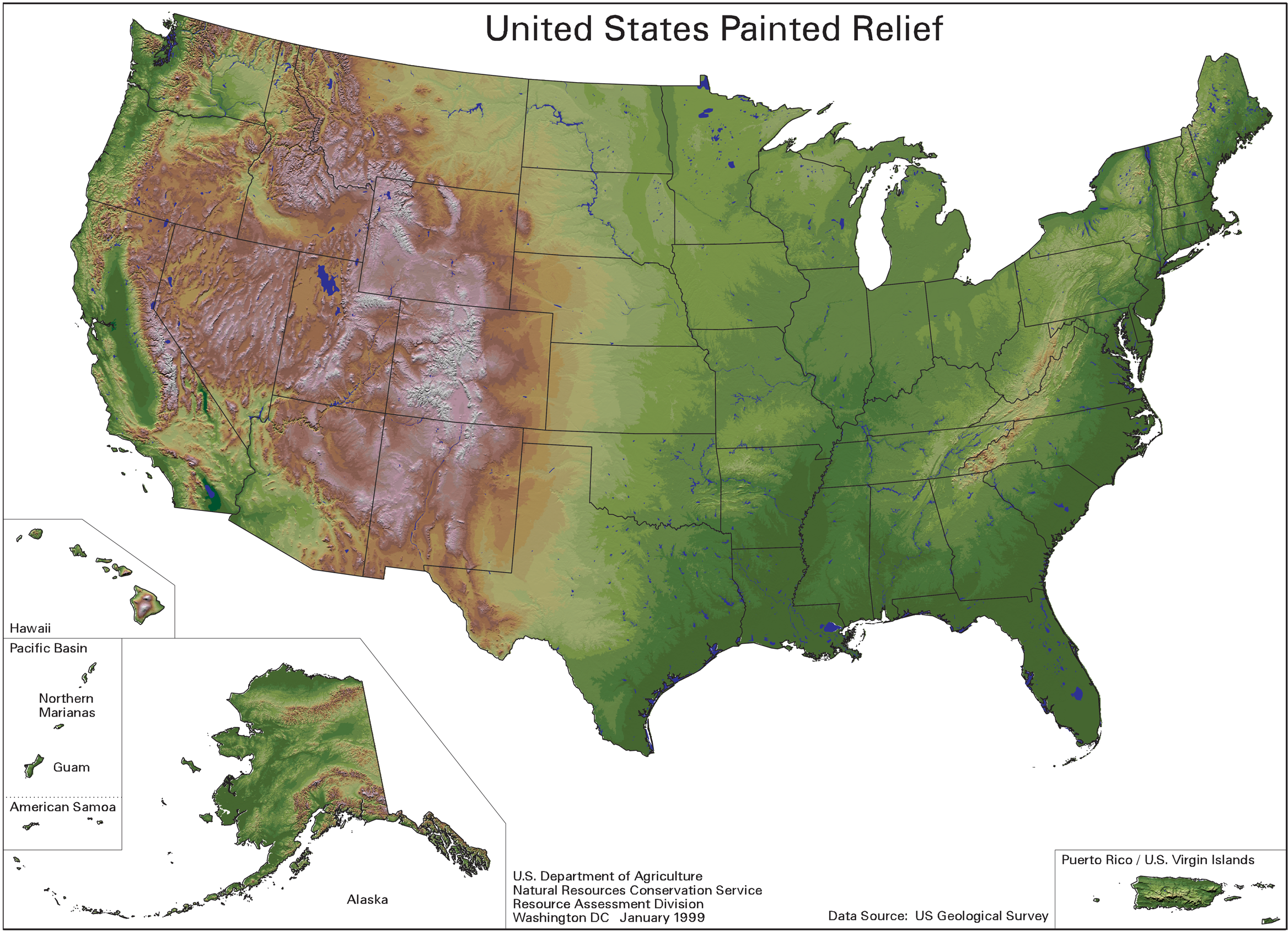
A topographic map of the United States

The United States is the third or fourth largest country by total area, with figures ranging between 3,717,813 and 3,809,525 square miles (9,629,091 and 9,866,624 km^{2}).

In 2021, the United States held 8% of the Earth's permanent meadows and pastures and 10% of its cropland. Starting in the east, the coastal plain of the Atlantic seaboard gives way to inland forests and rolling hills in the Piedmont plateau region. The Appalachian Mountains and the Adirondack Massif separate the East Coast from the Great Lakes and the grasslands of the Midwest. The Mississippi River System, the world's fourth-longest river system, runs predominantly north–south through the center of the country. The flat and fertile prairie of the Great Plains stretches to the west, interrupted by a highland region in the southeast.

The Rocky Mountains, west of the Great Plains, extend north to south across the country, peaking at over 14,000 feet (4,300 m) in Colorado. The supervolcano underlying Yellowstone National Park in the Rocky Mountains, the Yellowstone Caldera, is the continent's largest volcanic feature. Farther west are the rocky Great Basin and the Chihuahuan, Sonoran, and Mojave deserts. In the northwest corner of Arizona, carved by the Colorado River, is the Grand Canyon, a steep-sided canyon and popular tourist destination known for its overwhelming visual size and intricate, colorful landscape. The Cascade and Sierra Nevada mountain ranges run close to the Pacific coast. The lowest and highest points in the contiguous United States are in the state of California, about 84 miles (135 km) apart.

Alaska is a state in the northwestern regions of North America. It is a semi-exclave and separated from the contiguous United States. At an elevation of 20,310 feet (6,190.5 m), Alaska's Denali (also called Mount McKinley) is the highest peak in the country and on the continent. Active volcanoes in the U.S. are common throughout Alaska's Alexander and Aleutian Islands, while Hawaii has six active volcanoes, including Kilauea and Mauna Loa. Located entirely outside North America, the Hawaiian archipelago consists of volcanic islands, all physiographically and ethnologically part of the Polynesian subregion of Oceania.

In addition to its total land area, the United States has one of the world's largest marine exclusive economic zones, spanning approximately 4.5 million square miles (11.7 million km^{2}) of ocean.

=== Climate ===
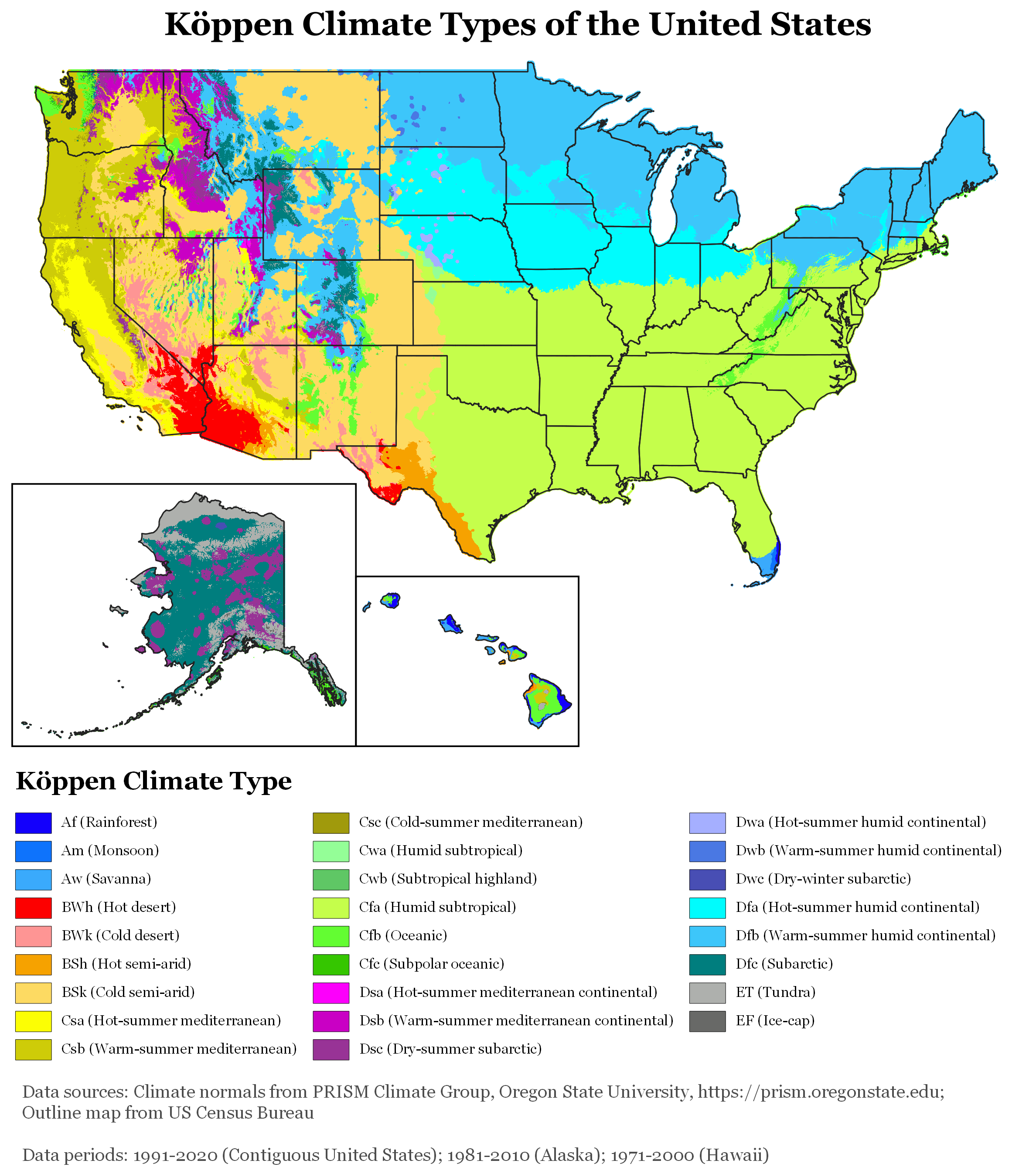
The Köppen climate types of the United States

With its large size and geographic variety, the United States includes most climate types. East of the 100th meridian, the climate ranges from humid continental in the north to humid subtropical in the south. The western Great Plains are semi-arid. Many mountainous areas of the American West have an alpine climate. The climate is arid in the Southwest, Mediterranean in coastal California, and oceanic in coastal Oregon, Washington, and southern Alaska. Most of Alaska is subarctic or polar. Hawaii, the southern tip of Florida and U.S. territories in the Caribbean and Pacific are tropical.

The United States receives more high-impact extreme weather incidents than any other country. States bordering the Gulf of Mexico are prone to hurricanes, and most of the world's tornadoes occur in the country, mainly in Tornado Alley. Due to climate change, extreme weather has become more frequent in the U.S. in the 21st century, with three times the number of reported heat waves compared to the 1960s. Since the 1990s, droughts in the American Southwest have become more persistent and more severe. The regions considered as the most attractive to the population are the most vulnerable.

=== Biodiversity and conservation ===
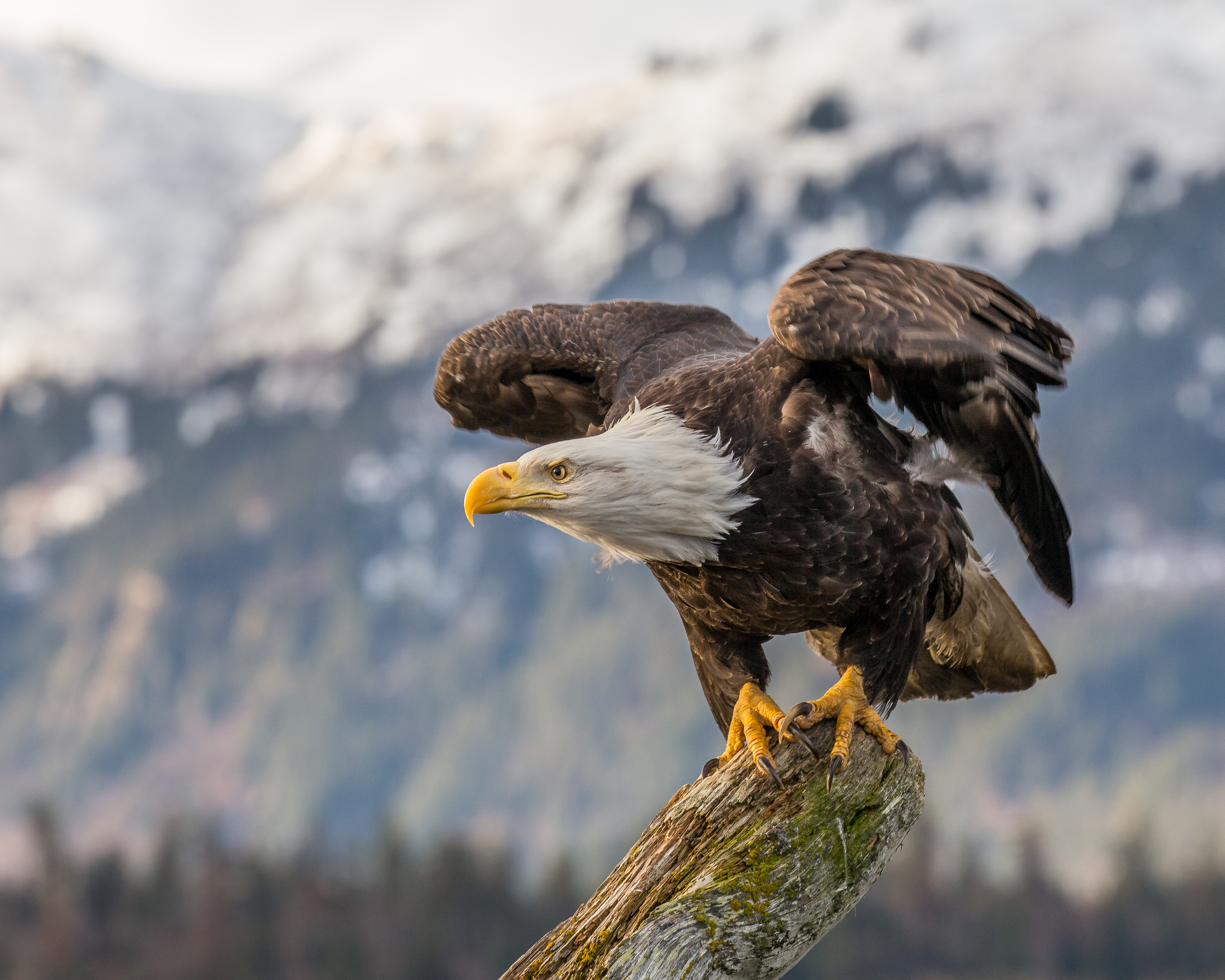
The bald eagle has been the national emblem of the United States since 1782, and was officially declared the national bird in 2024.

The U.S. is one of 17 megadiverse countries containing large numbers of endemic species: about 17,000 species of vascular plants occur in the contiguous United States and Alaska, and over 1,800 species of flowering plants are found in Hawaii, few of which occur on the mainland. The United States is home to 428 mammal species, 784 birds, 311 reptiles, 295 amphibians, and around 91,000 insect species.

There are 64 national parks, and hundreds of other federally managed monuments, forests, and wilderness areas, administered by the National Park Service and other agencies. About 28% of the country's land is publicly owned and federally managed, primarily in the Western States. Most of this land is protected, though some is leased for commercial use, and less than one percent is used for military purposes.

Environmental issues in the United States include debates on non-renewable resources and nuclear energy, air and water pollution, biodiversity, logging and deforestation, and climate change. The U.S. Environmental Protection Agency (EPA) is the federal agency charged with addressing most environmental-related issues. The idea of wilderness has shaped the management of public lands since 1964, with the Wilderness Act. The Endangered Species Act of 1973 provides a way to protect threatened and endangered species and their habitats. The United States Fish and Wildlife Service implements and enforces the Act. In 2024, the U.S. ranked 35th among 180 countries in the Environmental Performance Index.

== Government and politics ==
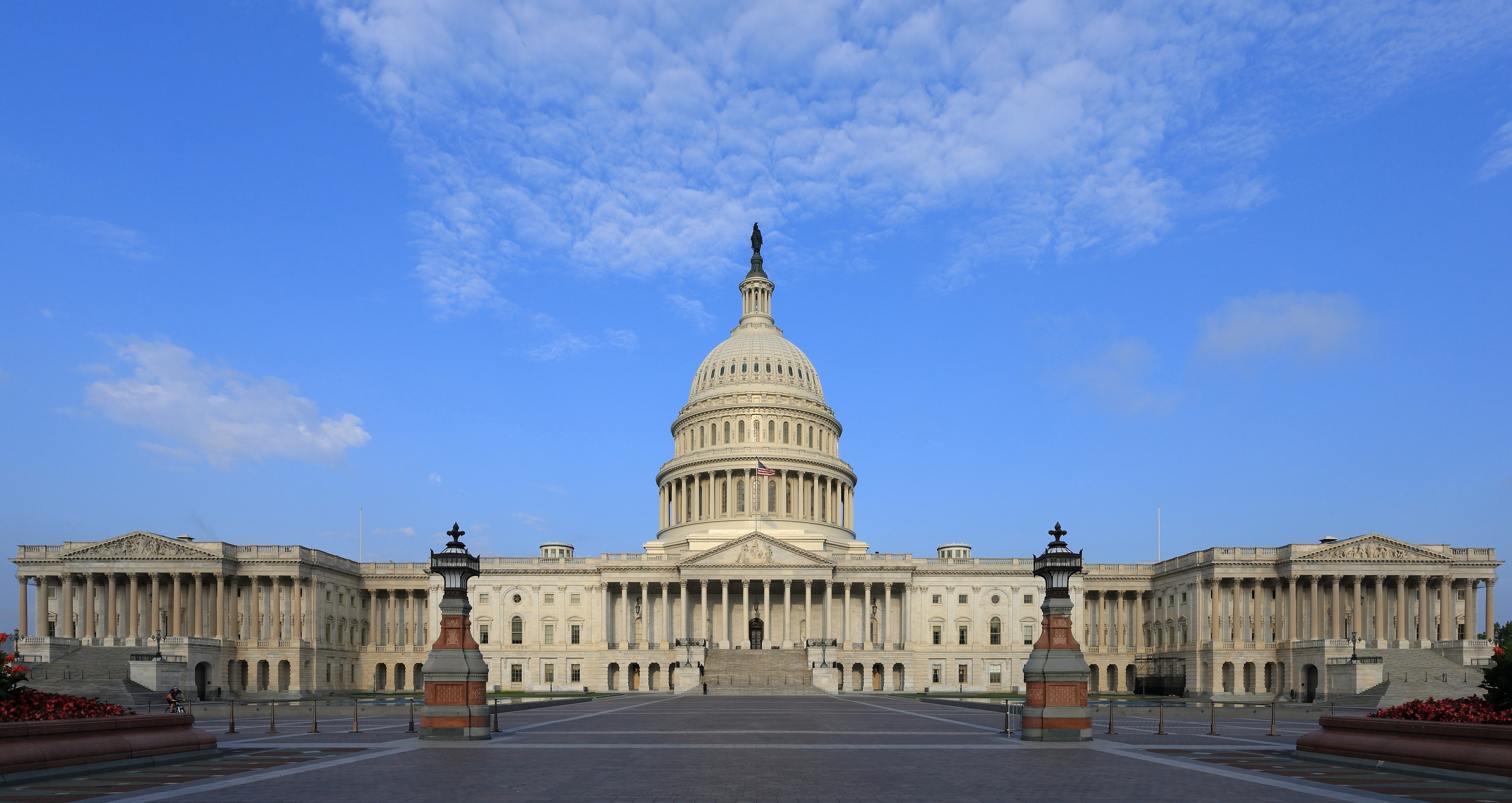
The Capitol Building, seat of legislative government, houses both chambers of Congress.

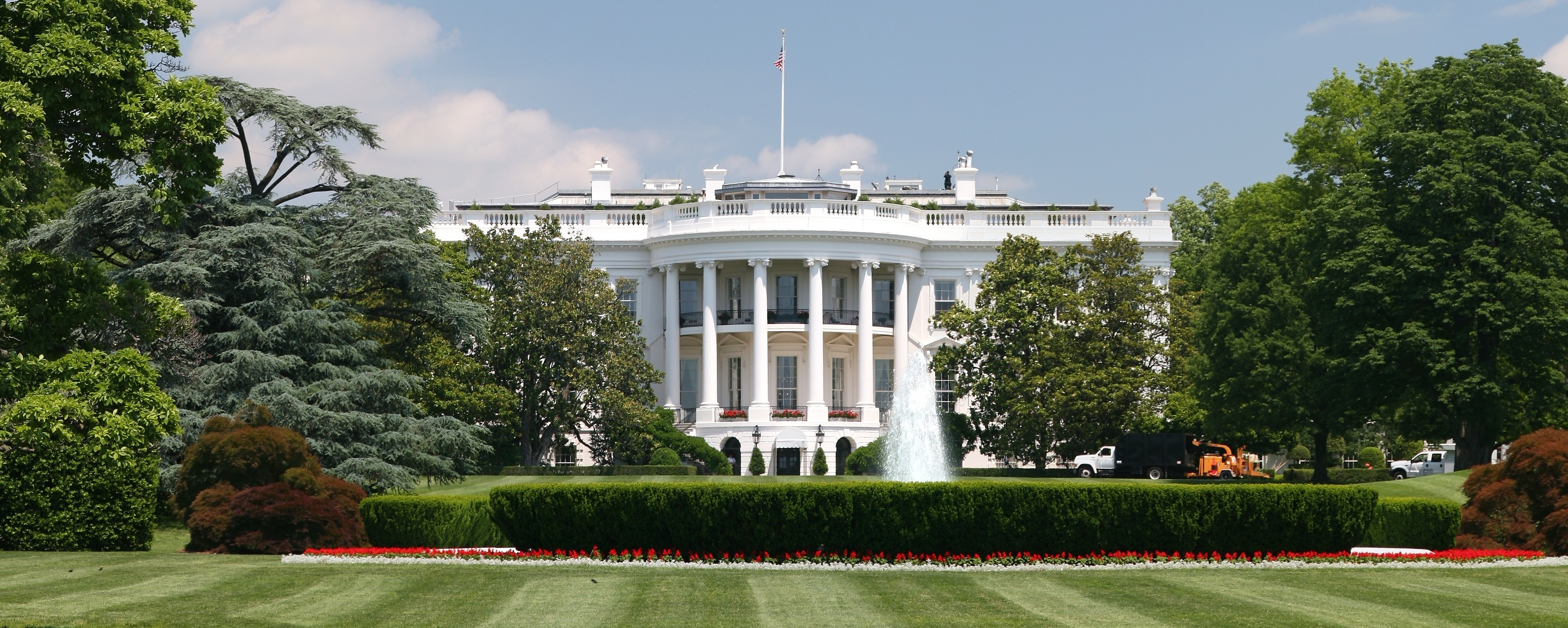
The White House, the president's residence and workplace, includes offices for the executive staff.

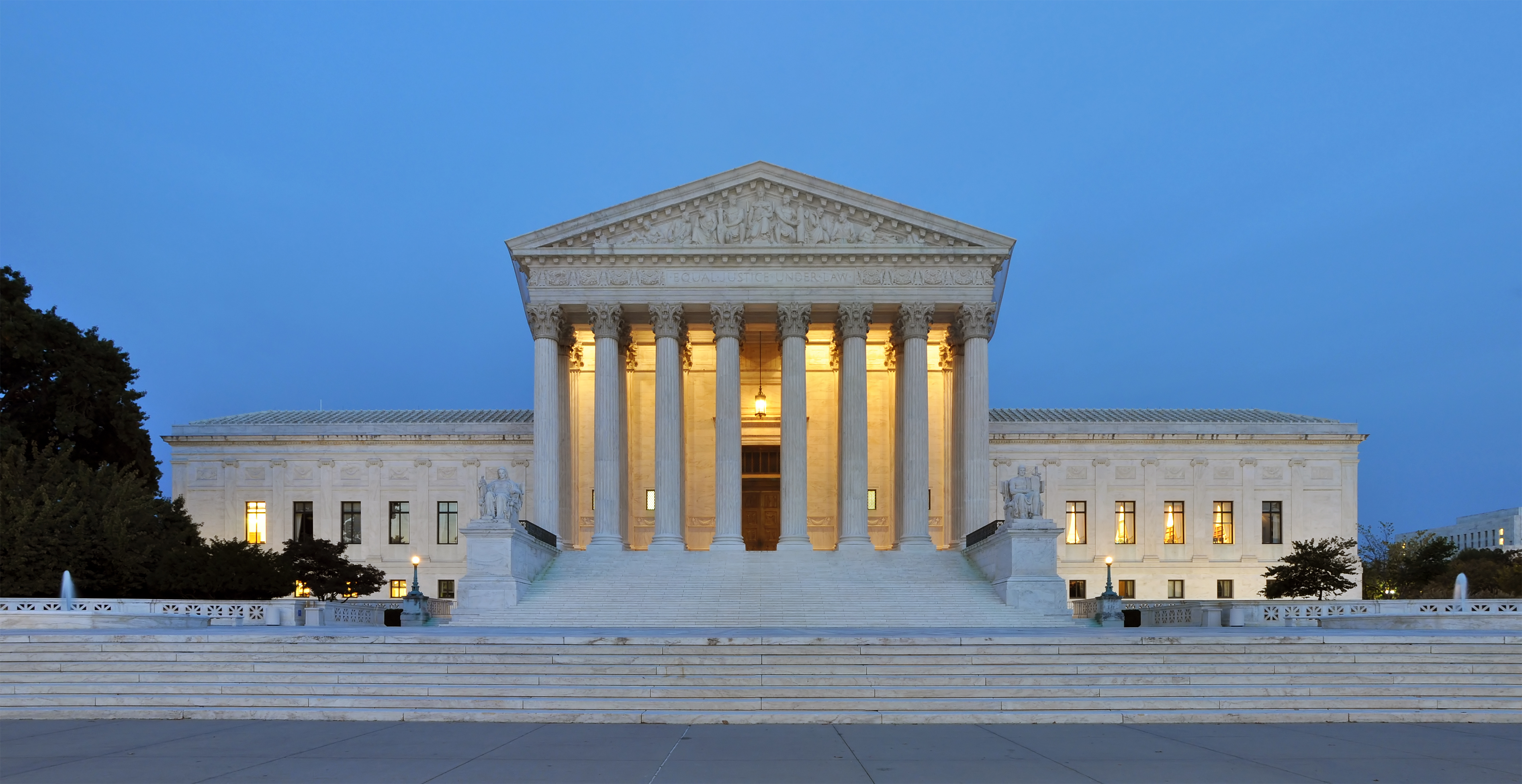
The Supreme Court Building houses the nation's highest court.

The United States is a federal republic consisting of 50 states and the District of Columbia (D.C.), a federal enclave containing the capital city, Washington, D.C. The U.S. asserts sovereignty over five unincorporated territories and several uninhabited island possessions. The Constitution of the United States serves as the country's supreme legal document.

It is the world's oldest surviving federation, and its presidential system of federal government has been adopted, in whole or in part, by many newly independent states worldwide following their decolonization.

=== Federal government ===
Composed of three branches, all headquartered in Washington, D.C., the federal government is the national government of the United States. The U.S. Constitution establishes a separation of powers intended to provide a system of checks and balances to prevent any of the three branches from becoming supreme. The three-branch system is known as the presidential system, in contrast to the parliamentary system where the executive is part of the legislative body. Many countries around the world adopted this aspect of the 1789 Constitution of the United States, especially in the postcolonial Americas.

==== Legislature ====
The U.S. Congress is a bicameral legislature made up of the Senate and the House of Representatives. The Senate has 100 members—two residents from each state and elected by that state's voters for a six-year term. The House of Representatives has 435 voting members, elected for a two-year term by the constituency of the congressional district in which they reside. District boundaries are generally drawn by state legislatures or redistricting commissions under state law. Every U.S. congressional district must be as nearly equal in population as practicable; each sends one representative to Congress. Election years for senators are staggered so that only one-third of them will be up for election every two years. U.S. representatives are all up for election at the same time every two years.

The U.S. Congress makes federal law, declares war, has the power of the purse, and has the power of impeachment. The Senate gives advice and consent to the ratification of treaties by a two-thirds vote of senators present. One of the foremost non-legislative functions of Congress is the power to investigate and oversee the executive branch. Congressional oversight is usually delegated to committees of elected members and is facilitated by Congress' power to issue subpoenas. Much of the work of Congress is performed by a collection of committees, each appointed for a specific purpose or function. Committee membership is by tradition and statute bipartisan, but all committees are chaired by a member of the majority party, who sets the committee agenda.

==== Executive ====
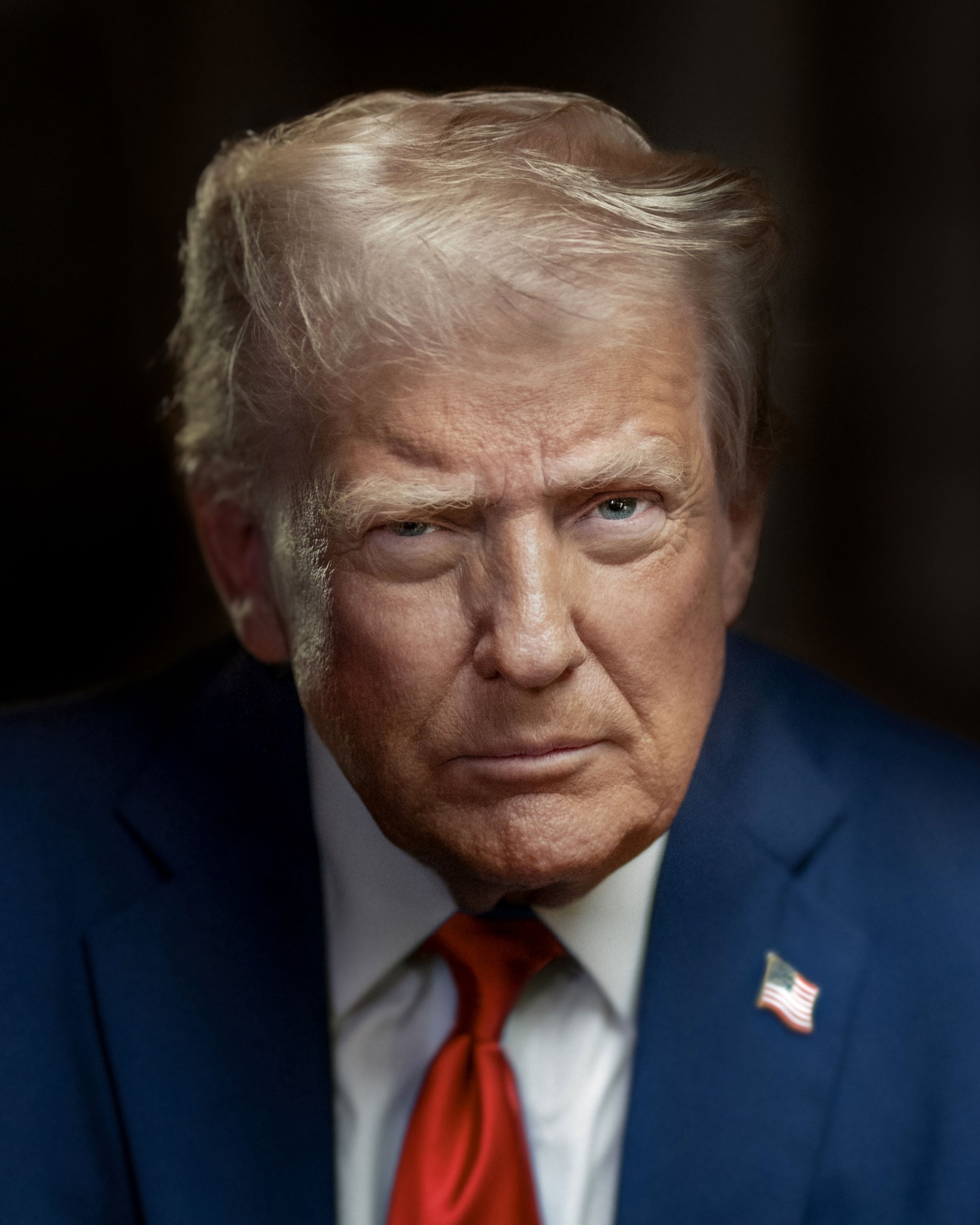
Donald Trump
President

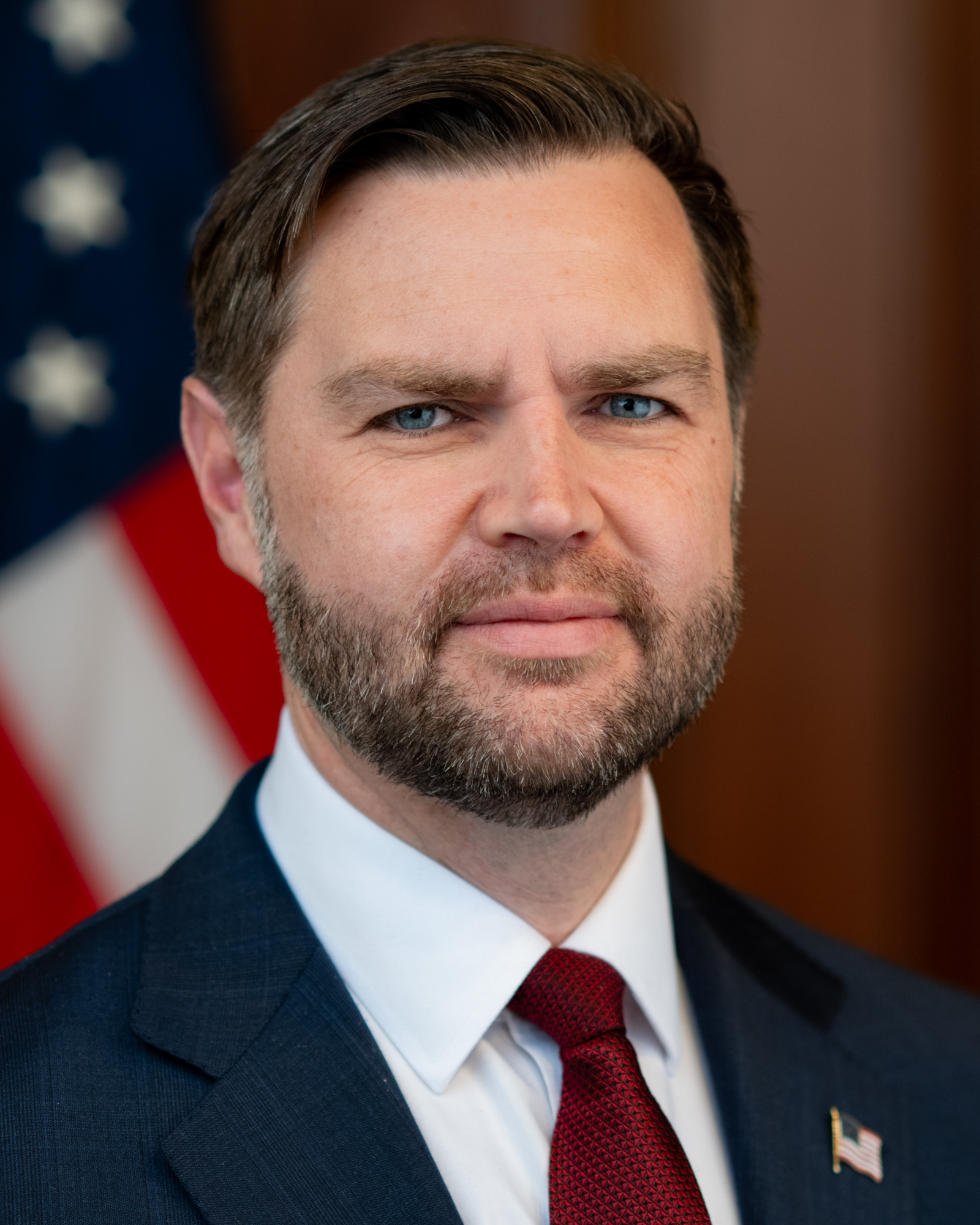
JD Vance
Vice President

The U.S. president is the head of state, commander-in-chief of the military, and chief executive of the federal government. The president appoints the members of the Cabinet, subject to Senate approval, and names other officials who administer and enforce federal law and policy through their respective agencies. The president has the ability to veto legislative bills from the U.S. Congress before they become law. However, presidential vetoes can be overridden by a two-thirds supermajority vote in both chambers of Congress. The president also has clemency power for federal crimes and can issue pardons. Finally, the president has the authority to issue expansive "executive orders" in a number of policy areas, subject to judicial review.

Candidates for president campaign with a vice-presidential running mate, and both candidates are elected or defeated together in a presidential election. Unlike other votes in American politics, this is technically an indirect election in which the winner will be determined by the U.S. Electoral College. Each state is allocated two electors plus one additional elector for every congressional district in the state, which in effect combines to equal the number of elected officials that state sends to Congress. The District of Columbia, with no voting representation in Congress, is allocated three electoral votes. (Note: Per the U.S. Constitution, Amendment Twenty-three, proposed by the U.S. Congress on June 16, 1960, and ratified by the States on March 29, 1961) Electoral College votes are officially cast by individual electors selected under procedures established by state law. In practice, 48 states and the District of Columbia require their electors to vote for the statewide popular-vote winner; Maine and Nebraska award two votes to the statewide winner and one to the winner in each congressional district. Both the president and the vice president serve a four-year term, and the president may be reelected to the office only once, for one additional four-year term.

==== Judiciary ====
The U.S. federal judiciary consists primarily of the U.S. Supreme Court, the U.S. courts of appeals, and the U.S. district courts. Judges for these courts are appointed under Article III: They are nominated by the president, confirmed by the Senate, and hold office subject to good behavior (generally resulting in life tenure). To limit interference from other branches, their compensation may not be reduced while they remain in office. Congress has also created Article I courts under its legislative powers, largely to handle administrative law; unlike Article III judges, whose tenure and compensation are protected by the Constitution, Article I judges generally serve fixed statutory terms.

Federal district courts are the primary trial courts of the federal judiciary and hear civil and criminal cases within their jurisdiction, primarily cases arising under federal statutes, the Constitution, or international treaties. Decisions of federal district courts may generally be challenged to a federal court of appeals. The U.S. judicial system's 12 regional circuits divide the country into geographic regions for appellate purposes, while the Federal Circuit has nationwide jurisdiction over specified types of cases.

The Supreme Court is the highest court in the federal judiciary. It has both original and appellate jurisdiction and exercises judicial review, under which it may hold laws or governmental actions unconstitutional. On average, the Supreme Court receives about 7,000 petitions for writs of certiorari each year but grants review in about 80 cases.

The Supreme Court consists of nine justices, including the chief justice of the United States, and decides cases before it by majority vote. When the Senate conducts an impeachment trial of a sitting president, the chief justice presides. Like other Article III judges, Supreme Court justices are nominated by the president and confirmed by the Senate and hold office during good behavior.

=== Subdivisions ===
Territories of the United States include American Samoa, Guam, the Northern Mariana Islands, Puerto Rico, and the U.S. Virgin Islands.

In the U.S. federal system, sovereign powers are shared between three levels of government specified in the Constitution: the federal government, the states, and Indian tribes. The U.S. also asserts sovereignty over five permanently inhabited territories: American Samoa, Guam, the Northern Mariana Islands, Puerto Rico, and the U.S. Virgin Islands.

Residents of the 50 states are governed by their elected state government, under state constitutions compatible with the national constitution, and by elected local governments that are administrative divisions of a state. States are subdivided into counties or county equivalents, which (except in Hawaii) can permit the formation of municipalities administered by their own elected representatives. The District of Columbia is a federal district containing the U.S. capital, Washington, D.C. The federal district is an administrative division of the federal government.

Map of the 326 Indian reservations in the United States; 231 recognized Alaska Native tribes are not shown.

As of January 2026, there were 575 federally recognized tribes. There are approximately 326 Indian reservations. The tribes hold a government-to-government relationship with the U.S. federal government in Washington and are legally defined as domestic dependent nations with inherent tribal sovereignty rights.

In addition to the five major territories, the U.S. also asserts sovereignty over the United States Minor Outlying Islands in the Pacific Ocean and the Caribbean. The seven undisputed islands without permanent populations are Baker Island, Howland Island, Jarvis Island, Johnston Atoll, Kingman Reef, Midway Atoll, and Palmyra Atoll. U.S. sovereignty over the unpopulated Bajo Nuevo Bank, Navassa Island, Serranilla Bank, and Wake Island is disputed.

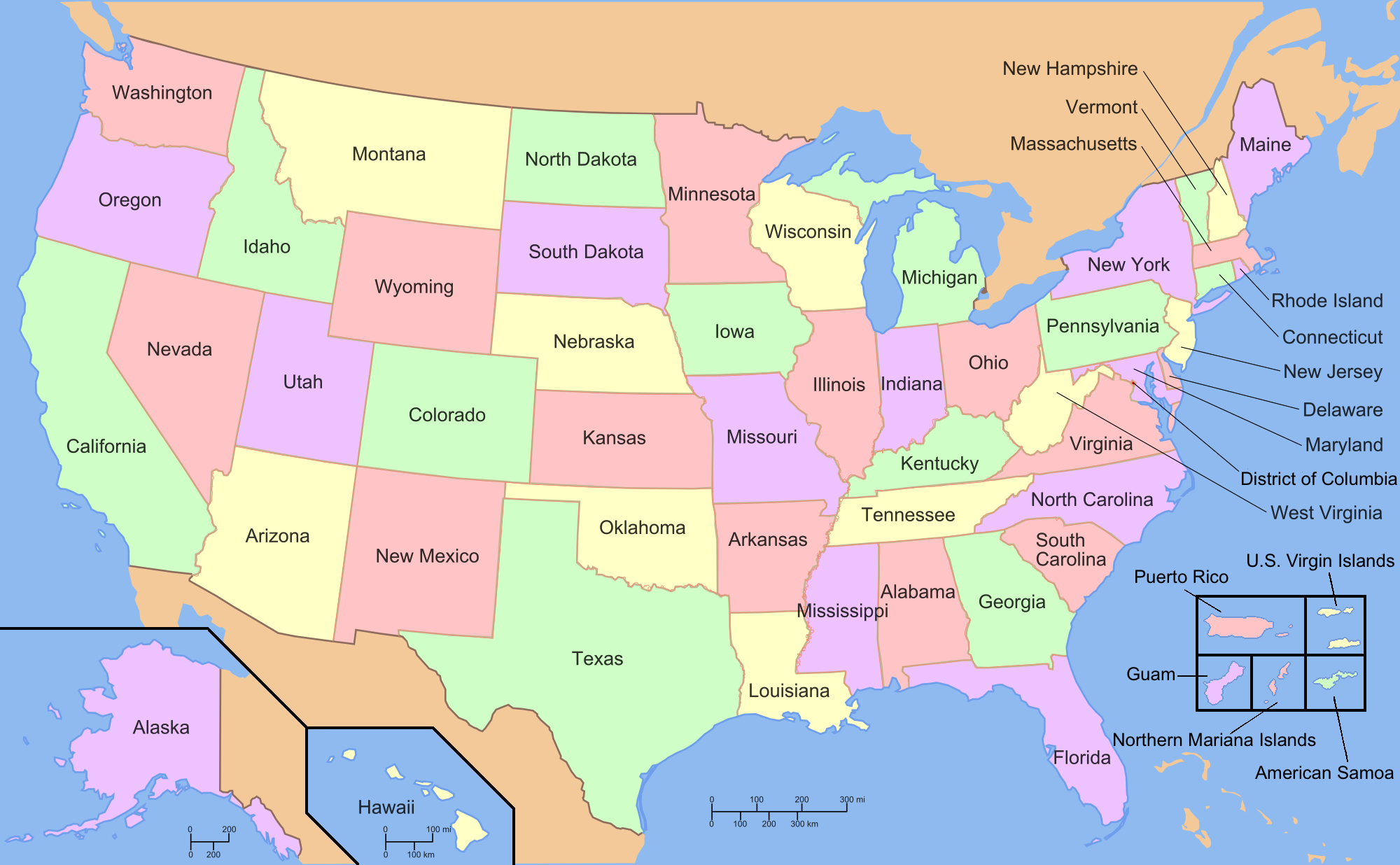

=== Political parties ===
States and territories by partisan control, as of February 2025: Democratic Party Republican Party New Progressive Party Divided partisan control

The Constitution is silent on political parties. However, they developed independently in the 18th century with the Federalist and Anti-Federalist parties. Since then, the United States has operated as a de facto two-party system, though the parties have changed over time.

Since the mid-19th century, the two main national parties have been the Democratic Party and the Republican Party. The Democratic Party is generally described as sitting on the center to center-left of the political spectrum, with a platform rooted in modern American liberalism, while the Republican Party is generally described as right-wing, with a platform rooted in American conservatism. Since the 2010s, a number of political scientists have characterized the Republican Party as having shifted toward right-wing populism and nationalism, with some comparative political studies classifying it as a far-right party. Surveys have also found that Democrats have become more consistently liberal and Republicans more consistently conservative, reducing ideological overlap between the two parties.

=== Foreign relations ===
The United States and its key allies: United States NATO members, excluding the U.S. itself Major non-NATO allies Former major non-NATO ally

The United States has the world's second-largest diplomatic corps and maintains full diplomatic relations with 195 states. The history of U.S. foreign policy began with isolationism but gradually shifted towards interventionism; the U.S. emerged as the de facto leader of the post–World War II liberal international order as a founding member of numerous international organizations, including the United Nations. The U.S. is a permanent member of the UN Security Council and member of the G7, G20, OECD, and Organization of American States.

On national security, the United States works closely with NATO's 31 other members and designates 21 additional countries as "major non-NATO allies". (Note: Under U.S. law, Taiwan is treated as a 22nd major non-NATO ally, though not formally designated as such.) As a present superpower, the U.S. has increasingly focused on the Indo-Pacific region, seeking to counter China.

The U.S. has a "Special Relationship" with the United Kingdom and historically strong ties to Canada, Australia, and New Zealand; together, they form the Five Eyes intelligence alliance. Through the Compact of Free Association, the U.S. has authority over security and defense for Micronesia, the Marshall Islands, and Palau. In 2024, the largest purchasers of U.S. arms exports were Turkey, Poland, and Japan; meanwhile, the largest recipients of U.S. military aid were Israel, Ukraine, and Taiwan.

=== Military ===
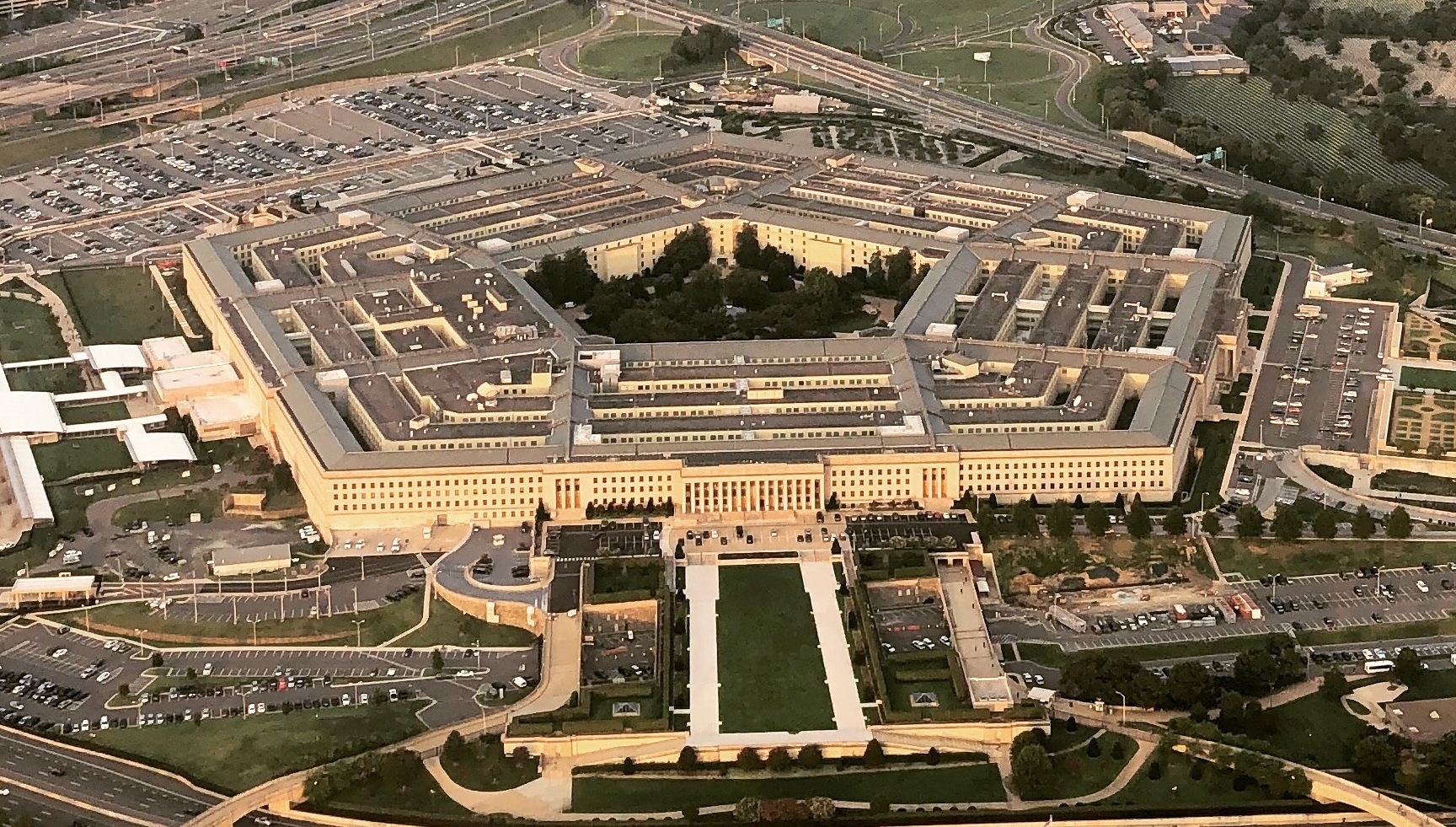
The Pentagon, the headquarters of the U.S. Department of Defense in Arlington County, Virginia, is one of the world's largest office buildings with over 6.5 million square feet (600,000 m^{2}) of floor space.

The president is the commander-in-chief of the United States Armed Forces and appoints its leaders, the secretary of defense and the Joint Chiefs of Staff. The Department of Defense, headquartered at the Pentagon near Washington, D.C., administers five of the six service branches, which are made up of the U.S. Army, Marine Corps, Navy, Air Force, and Space Force. The Coast Guard is administered by the Department of Homeland Security in peacetime and can be transferred to the Department of the Navy in wartime. Total strength of the entire military is about 1.3 million active duty with an additional 400,000 in reserve.

The United States military is widely regarded as the most powerful and advanced in the world. The U.S. military budget was $954 billion in 2025, which is by far the largest of any country, making up 33% of global military spending and accounting for 3.1% of total U.S. GDP. The United States possesses 42% of the world's nuclear weapons—the second-largest stockpile after that of Russia. The U.S. has the third-largest combined armed forces in the world, behind the Chinese People's Liberation Army and Indian Armed Forces. In addition to the vast network of military bases on its soil, the U.S. maintains approximately 800 other bases and installations around the world, and it deploys greater than 100 active-duty personnel in each of 25 foreign countries. The United States has engaged in over 400 military interventions since its founding in 1776, with over half of these occurring between 1950 and 2019 and 25% occurring in the post–Cold War era.

State defense forces (SDFs) are military units that operate under the sole authority of a state government. SDFs are authorized by state and federal law but are under the command of the state's governor. By contrast, the 54 U.S. National Guard organizations (Note: One for each state, the District of Columbia, and the territories of Puerto Rico, Guam, and the U.S. Virgin Islands) fall under the dual control of state or territorial governments and the federal government. The National Guard personnel of a state or territory can be federalized by the president under the National Defense Act Amendments of 1933; this legislation created the Guard and provides for the integration of Army National Guard and Air National Guard units and personnel into the U.S. Army and (since 1947) the U.S. Air Force. SDFs cannot be federalized. The total number of National Guard members is about 430,000, while the estimated combined strength of SDFs is less than 10,000.

=== Law enforcement and criminal justice ===
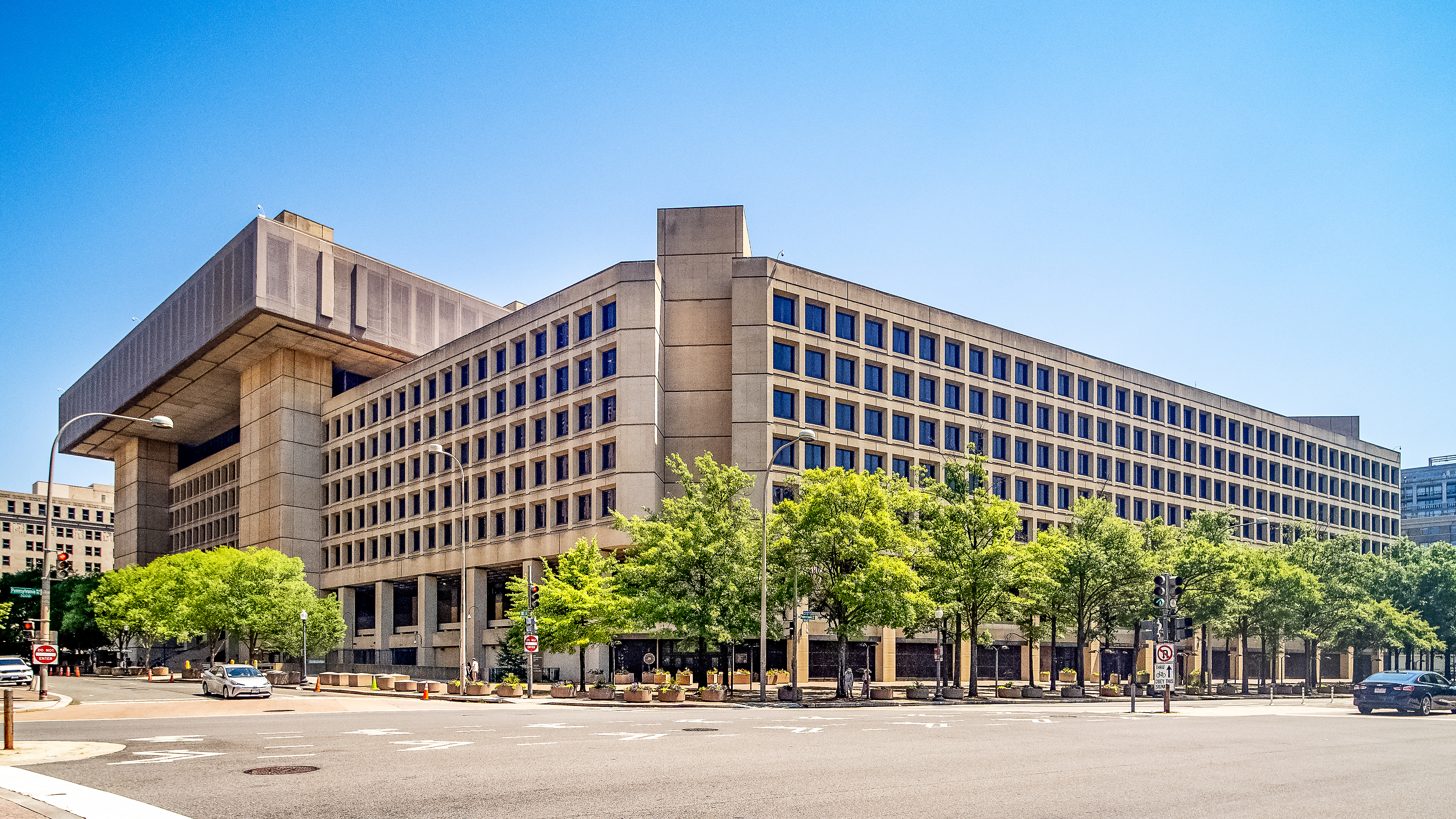
J. Edgar Hoover Building, the headquarters of the Federal Bureau of Investigation (FBI), in Washington, D.C.

There are about 18,000 U.S. police agencies from local to national level in the United States. Law in the United States is mainly enforced by local police departments and sheriff departments in their municipal or county jurisdictions. The state police departments have authority in their respective state, and federal agencies such as the Federal Bureau of Investigation (FBI) and the U.S. Marshals Service have national jurisdiction and specialized duties, such as protecting civil rights, national security, enforcing U.S. federal courts' rulings and federal laws, and interstate criminal activity. State courts conduct almost all civil and criminal trials, while federal courts adjudicate the much smaller number of civil and criminal cases that relate to federal law.

There is no unified "criminal justice system" in the United States. The American prison system is largely heterogenous, with thousands of relatively independent systems operating across federal, state, local, and tribal levels. In 2026, "these systems hold nearly 2 million people in 1,566 state prisons, 98 federal prisons, 3,116 local jails, 1,277 juvenile correctional facilities, 220 immigration detention facilities, and 77 Indian country jails, as well as in military prisons, civil commitment centers, state psychiatric hospitals, and prisons in the U.S. territories—at a system-wide cost of at least $445 billion each year."

Despite disparate systems of confinement, four main institutions dominate: federal prisons, state prisons, local jails, and juvenile correctional facilities. Federal prisons are run by the Federal Bureau of Prisons and hold pretrial detainees as well as people who have been convicted of federal crimes. State prisons, run by the department of corrections of each state, hold people sentenced and serving prison time (usually longer than one year) for felony offenses. Local jails are county or municipal facilities that incarcerate defendants prior to trial; they also hold those serving short sentences (typically under a year). Juvenile correctional facilities are operated by local or state governments and serve as longer-term placements for any minor adjudicated as delinquent and ordered by a judge to be confined.

In January 2023, the United States had the sixth-highest per capita incarceration rate in the world—531 people per 100,000 inhabitants—and the largest prison and jail population in the world, with more than 1.9 million people incarcerated. An analysis of the World Health Organization Mortality Database from 2010 showed U.S. homicide rates "were 7 times higher than in other high-income countries, driven by a gun homicide rate that was 25 times higher".

The country's legal system is classified by some political scientists and legal scholars as operating under a "partial rule of law" system, according to two 2026 surveys conducted by Bright Line Watch and the London School of Economics.

== Economy ==
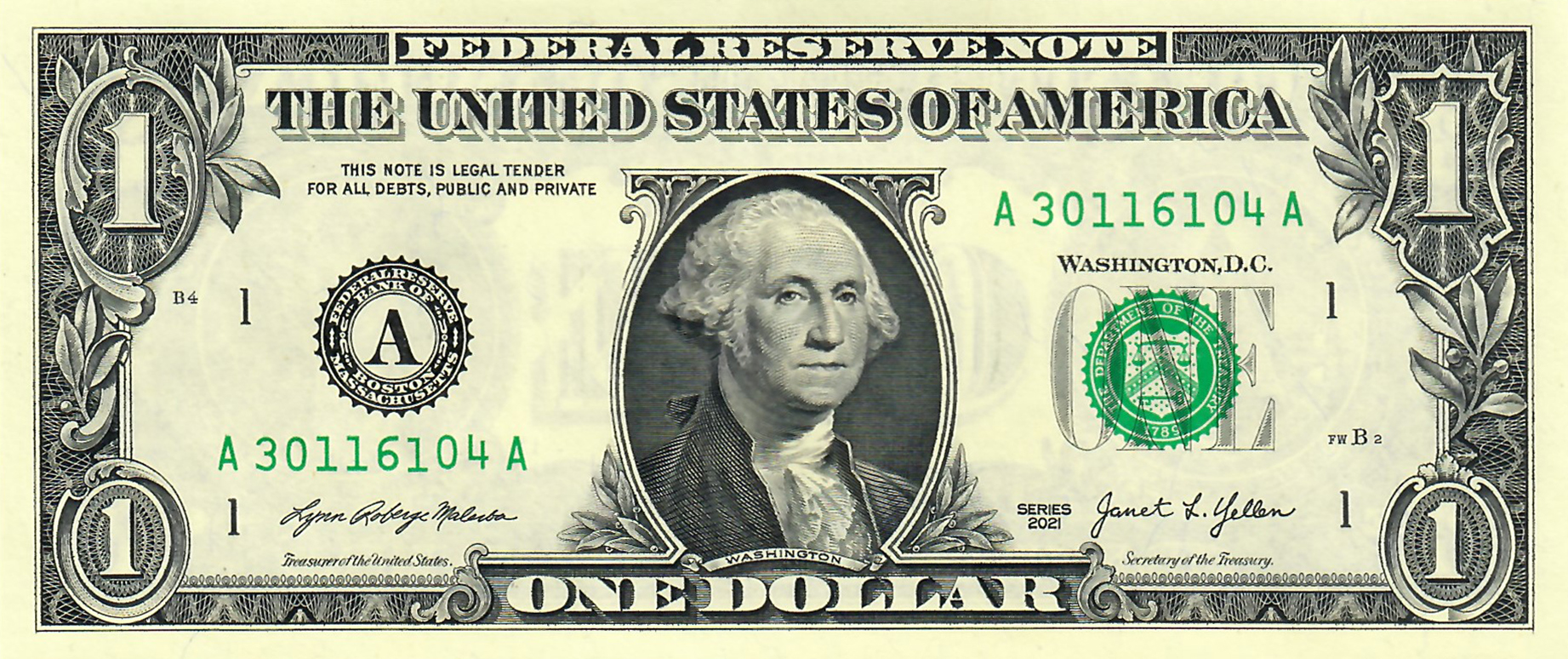
The U.S. dollar is the most-used currency in international transactions and the world's foremost reserve currency.

The U.S. has a highly developed mixed economy that has been the world's largest nominally since about 1890. Its 2024 gross domestic product (GDP) of more than $29 trillion constituted over 25% of nominal global economic output, or 15% at purchasing power parity (PPP). The country ranks first in the world by nominal GDP, second when adjusted for purchasing power parities (PPP), and ninth by PPP-adjusted GDP per capita. In August 2026, the total U.S. federal government debt passed $40 trillion, having more than doubled in the previous decade.

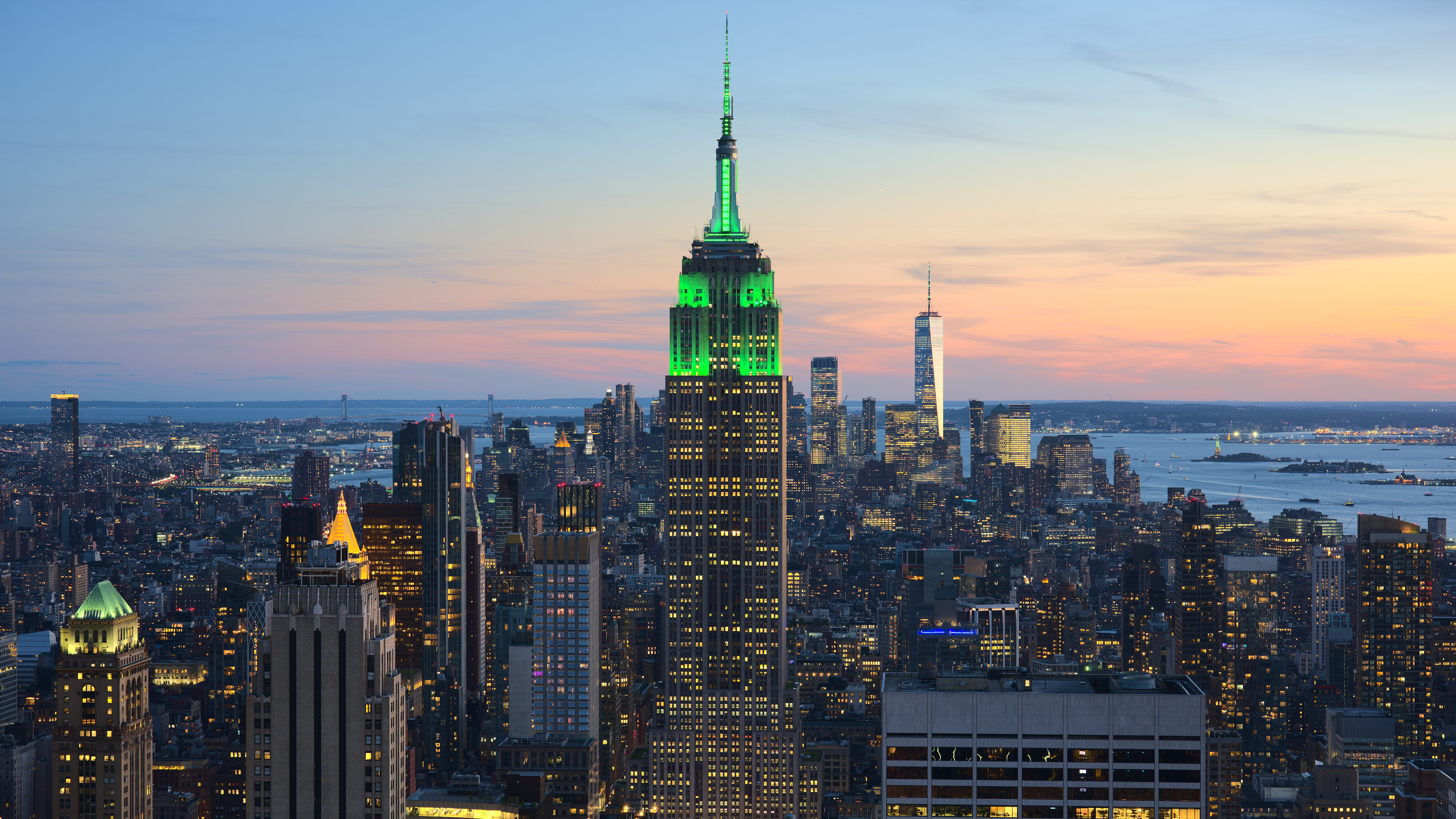
New York City is the world's principal financial center, and its metropolitan area is the world's largest metropolitan economy.

Of the world's 500 largest companies by revenue, 138 were headquartered in the U.S. in 2025, the highest number of any country. The U.S. dollar is the currency most used in international transactions and the world's foremost reserve currency, backed by the country's dominant economy, its military, the petrodollar system, its large U.S. treasuries market, and its linked eurodollar. Several countries use it as their official currency, and in others it is the de facto currency. The U.S. has free trade agreements with several countries, including the USMCA. Although the United States has reached a post-industrial level of economic development and is often described as having a service economy, it remains a major industrial power; in 2024, the U.S. manufacturing sector was the world's second-largest by value output after China's.

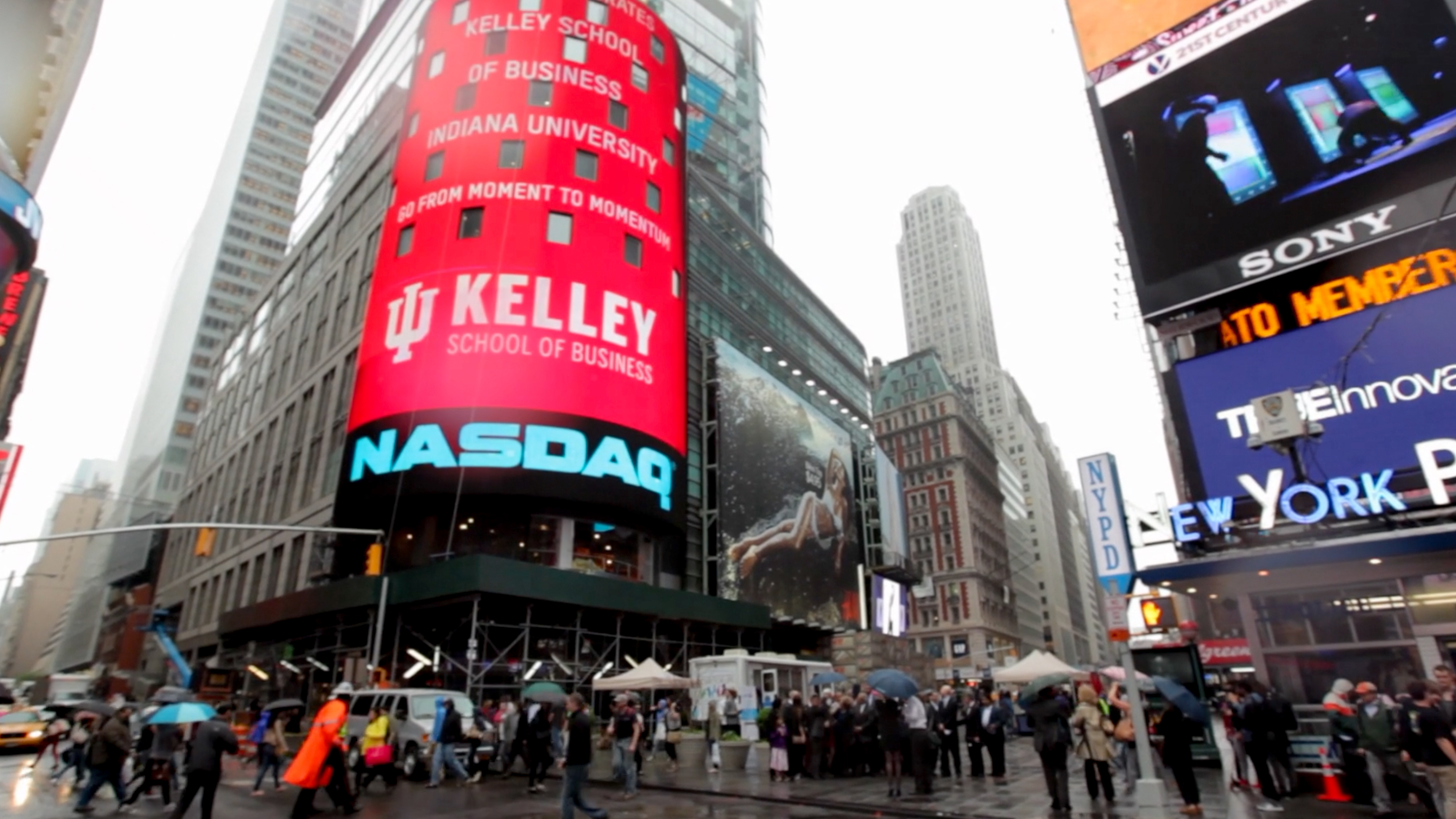

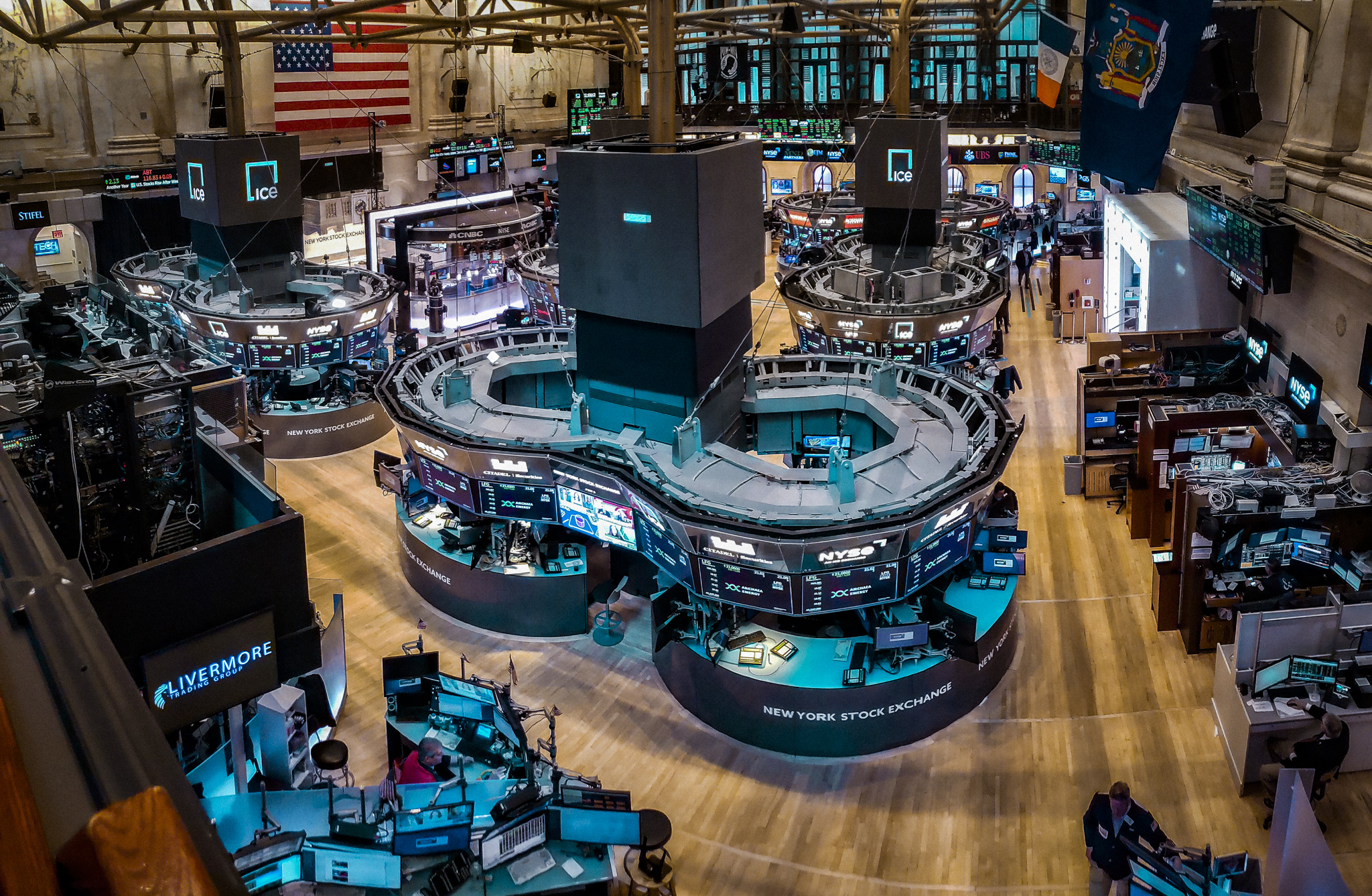
The NASDAQ (top) and the New York Stock Exchange (bottom) are the world's largest stock exchanges.

New York City is the world's principal financial center, and its metropolitan area is the world's largest metropolitan economy. The NASDAQ and the New York Stock Exchange, both located in New York City, are the world's two largest stock exchanges by total market capitalization and trade volume of their listed companies. The United States is at the forefront of technological advancement and innovation in many economic fields, especially in artificial intelligence; electronics and computers; pharmaceuticals; and medical, aerospace and military equipment. The country's economy is fueled by abundant natural resources, a well-developed infrastructure, and high productivity. The largest trading partners of the United States are the European Union, Mexico, Canada, China, Japan, South Korea, the United Kingdom, Vietnam, India, and Taiwan. The United States is the world's largest importer and second-largest exporter. (Note: A country's total exports are usually understood to be goods and services. Based on this, the U.S. is the world's second-largest exporter, after China. However, if primary income is included, the U.S. is the world's largest exporter.) It is by far the world's largest exporter of services.

Americans have the highest average household and employee income among OECD member states, and the fourth-highest median household income in 2023, up from sixth-highest in 2013. With personal consumption expenditures of over $18.5 trillion in 2023, the U.S. has a heavily consumer-driven economy and is the world's largest consumer market. The U.S. ranked first in the number of dollar billionaires and millionaires in 2023, with 735 billionaires and nearly 22 million millionaires.

Wealth in the United States is highly concentrated; in 2011, the richest 10% of the adult population owned 72% of the country's household wealth, while the bottom 50% owned just 2%. U.S. wealth inequality increased substantially since the late 1980s, and income inequality in the U.S. reached a record high in 2019. In 2024, the country had some of the highest wealth and income inequality levels among OECD countries. Since the 1970s, there has been a decoupling of U.S. wage gains from worker productivity, while the economy has become more dominated by financial services and stock trading. In 2016, the top fifth of earners took home more than half of all income, giving the U.S. one of the widest income distributions among OECD countries. There were about 771,480 homeless persons in the U.S. on a single night in January 2024. In 2022, 6.4 million children experienced food insecurity. Feeding America estimates that around one in five, or approximately 13 million, children experience hunger in the U.S. and do not know where or when they will get their next meal. Also in 2022, about 37.9 million people, or 11.5% of the U.S. population, were living in poverty.

The United States has a smaller welfare state and redistributes less income through government action than most other high-income countries. It is the only advanced economy that does not guarantee its workers paid vacation nationally and one of a few countries in the world without paid family leave as a legal right. The United States has a higher percentage of low-income workers than almost any other developed country, largely because of a weak collective bargaining system and lack of government support for at-risk workers.

=== Science and technology ===
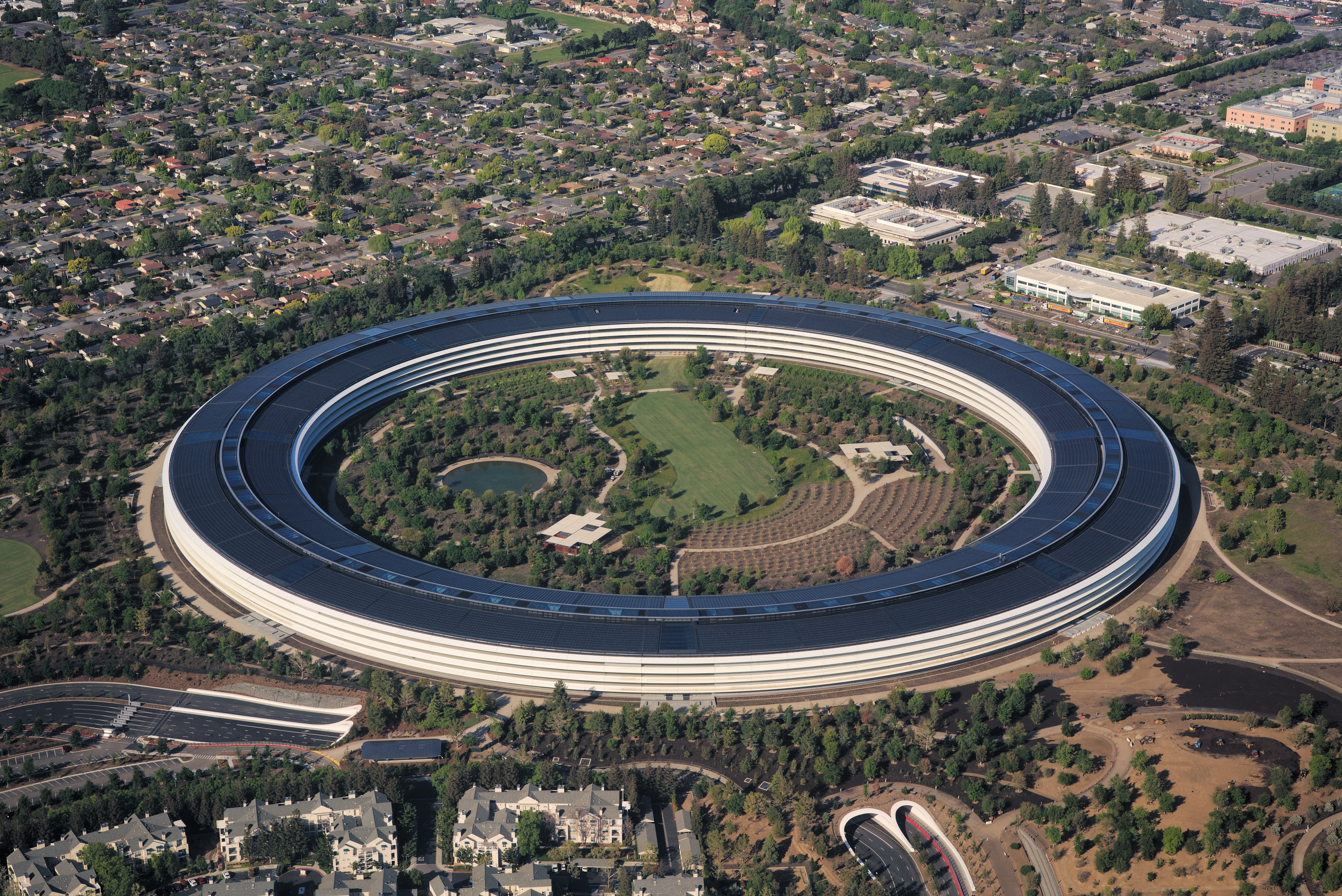
California's Silicon Valley, the largest and foremost technology and innovation hub in the world, is home to numerous Big Tech headquarters such as Apple Park.

The United States has been a leader in technological innovation since the late 19th century and scientific research since the mid-20th century. Methods for producing interchangeable parts and the establishment of a machine tool industry enabled the large-scale manufacturing of U.S. consumer products in the late 19th century. By the early 20th century, factory electrification, the introduction of the assembly line, and other labor-saving techniques created the system of mass production.

In the 21st century, the United States continues to be one of the world's foremost scientific powers, though China has emerged as a major competitor in many fields. The U.S. has the highest research and development expenditures of any country and ranks ninth as a percentage of GDP. In 2022, the United States was (after China) the country with the second-highest number of published scientific papers. The United States is considered to be a world leader in the development of artificial intelligence technology.

==== Spaceflight ====
Astronaut Buzz Aldrin (with Neil Armstrong seen in visor reflection) during the 1969 Apollo 11 mission, the first of six crewed Moon landings. The United States is the only country to have landed humans on the Moon.

The United States has maintained a space program since the late 1950s, beginning with the establishment of the National Aeronautics and Space Administration (NASA) in 1958. In 1961, the United States became the second country (after the Soviet Union) to successfully launch a human into space. NASA's Apollo program (1961–1972) achieved the first crewed Moon landing with the 1969 Apollo 11 mission; it remains one of the agency's most significant milestones. Other major endeavors by NASA include the Space Shuttle program (1981–2011), the Voyager program (1972–present), the Hubble and James Webb space telescopes (launched in 1990 and 2021, respectively), and the multi-mission Mars Exploration Program (Spirit, Opportunity, Curiosity, and Perseverance). NASA is one of five agencies collaborating on the International Space Station (ISS); U.S. contributions to the ISS include several modules, including Destiny (2001), Harmony (2007), and Tranquility (2010), as well as ongoing logistical and operational support.

The United States private sector dominates the global commercial spaceflight industry. Prominent American spaceflight contractors include Blue Origin, Boeing, Lockheed Martin, Northrop Grumman, and SpaceX. NASA programs such as the Commercial Crew Program, Commercial Resupply Services, Commercial Lunar Payload Services, and NextSTEP have facilitated growing private-sector involvement in American spaceflight.

=== Energy ===
In 2023, the United States received approximately 84% of its energy from fossil fuel, and its largest source of energy was petroleum (38%), followed by natural gas (36%), renewable sources (9%), coal (9%), and nuclear power (9%). In 2022, the United States constituted about 4% of the world's population, but consumed around 16% of the world's energy. The U.S. ranks as the second-highest emitter of greenhouse gases behind China.

The U.S. is the world's largest producer of nuclear power, generating around 30% of the world's nuclear electricity. It also has the highest number of nuclear power reactors of any country. From 2024, the U.S. plans to triple its nuclear power capacity by 2050.

=== Transportation ===
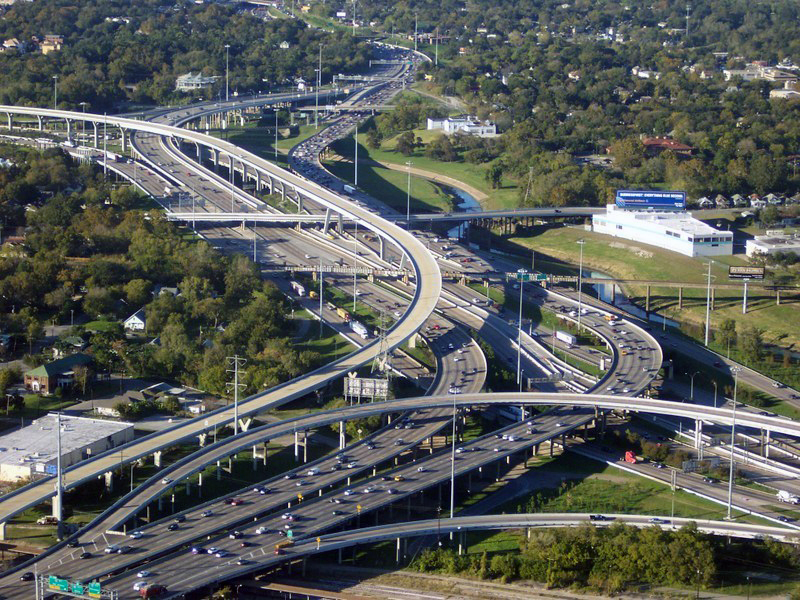
Interchange between Interstate 10 and Interstate 45 in Houston, Texas

The United States' 4 million miles (6.4 million kilometers) of road network, owned almost entirely by state and local governments, is the longest in the world. The extensive Interstate Highway System that connects all major U.S. cities is funded mostly by the federal government but maintained by state departments of transportation. The system is further extended by state highways and some private toll roads.

The U.S. ranks among the ten countries with the highest vehicle ownership per capita, with 850 vehicles per 1,000 residents in 2022. A 2024 survey reported 58.3% of households with two or more vehicles, and 21.9% with three or more. According to the 2022 American Community Survey, 68.7% of U.S. workers aged 16 and older drove alone to work, 2.9% walked or cycled, and 3.1% used public transportation.

Public transportation in the United States is well developed in the largest urban areas, notably New York City, Washington, D.C., Boston, Philadelphia, Chicago, and the San Francisco Bay Area where rapid transit and/or light rail is a major component, however most metropolitan areas rely on bus for public transportation; otherwise, coverage is generally less extensive than in most other developed countries and many U.S. localities are car-dependent.

Long-distance intercity travel is provided primarily by airlines, but travel by rail is more common along the Northeast Corridor, where the only high-speed rail in the U.S. that meets international standards operates. Amtrak, the country's government-sponsored national passenger rail company, has a relatively sparse network compared to that of Western European countries. Service is concentrated in the Northeast, California, the Midwest, and the Pacific Northwest. The country's rail transport network, the longest in the world at 182,412.3 mi (293,564.2 km), handles mostly freight (in contrast to more passenger-centered rail in Europe). Because they are often privately owned, U.S. freight railroads lag behind much of the rest of the world in terms of electrification.

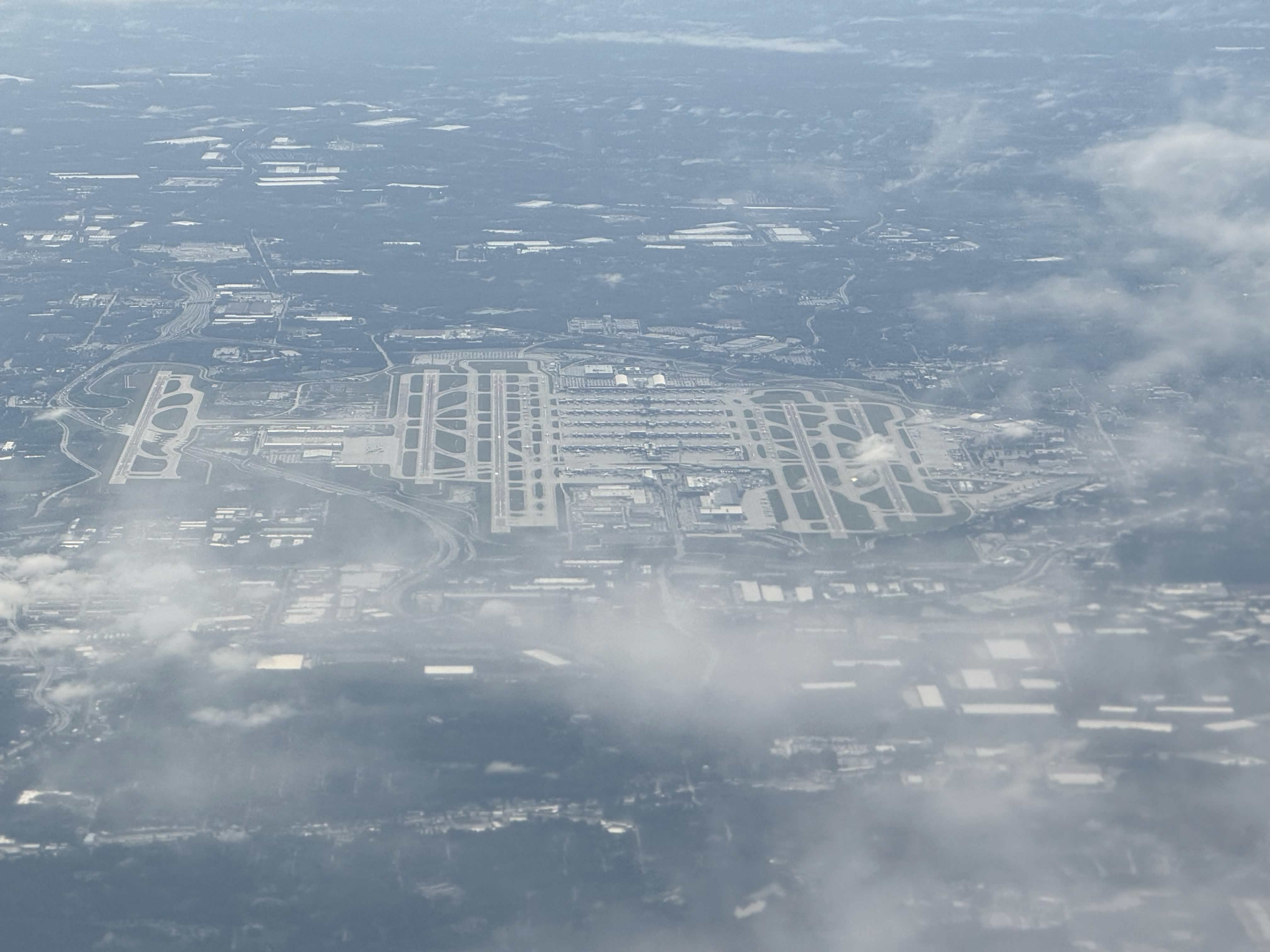
Hartsfield–Jackson Atlanta International Airport, serving the Atlanta metropolitan area, is the world's busiest airport by passenger traffic with over 75 million passengers as of 2021.

The United States has an extensive air transportation network. U.S. civilian airlines are all privately owned. The three largest airlines in the world, by total number of passengers carried, are U.S.-based; American Airlines became the global leader after its 2013 merger with US Airways. Of the 50 busiest airports in the world, 16 are in the United States, as well as five of the top 10. The world's busiest airport by passenger volume is Hartsfield–Jackson Atlanta International in Atlanta, Georgia. In 2022, most of the 19,969 U.S. airports were owned and operated by local government authorities, and there are also some private airports. Some 5,193 are designated as "public use", including for general aviation. The Transportation Security Administration (TSA) has provided security at most major airports since 2001.

The country's inland waterways are the world's fifth-longest, totaling 25,482 mi (41,009 km). They are used extensively for freight, recreation, and a small amount of passenger traffic. Of the world's 50 busiest container ports, four are located in the United States, with the busiest in the country being the Port of Los Angeles.

== Demographics ==
=== Population ===
The 10 most populous U.S. states (2025 estimates)
State	Population (millions)
California	39.4
Texas	31.7
Florida	23.5
New York	20.0
Pennsylvania	13.1
Illinois	12.7
Ohio	11.9
Georgia	11.3
North Carolina	11.2
Michigan	10.1

The U.S. Census Bureau reported 331,449,281 residents on April 1, 2020, (Note: This figure, like most official data for the United States as a whole, excludes the five unincorporated territories (Puerto Rico, Guam, the U.S. Virgin Islands, American Samoa, and the Northern Mariana Islands) and minor island possessions.) making the United States the third-most-populous country in the world, after India and China. The Census Bureau's official 2025 population estimate was 341,784,857, an increase of 3.1% since the 2020 census. According to the Bureau's U.S. Population Clock, on July 1, 2024, the U.S. population had a net gain of one person every 16 seconds, or about 5400 people per day. In 2023, 51% of Americans age 15 and over were married, 6% were widowed, 10% were divorced, and 34% had never been married. In 2023, the total fertility rate for the U.S. stood at 1.6 children per woman, and, at 23%, it had the world's highest rate of children living in single-parent households in 2019. Most Americans live in the suburbs of major metropolitan areas.

The United States has a diverse population; 37 ancestry groups have more than one million members. White Americans with ancestry from Europe, the Middle East, or North Africa form the largest racial and ethnic group at 57.8% of the United States population. Hispanic and Latino Americans form the second-largest group and are 18.7% of the United States population. African Americans constitute the country's third-largest ancestry group and are 12.1% of the total U.S. population. Asian Americans are the country's fourth-largest group, composing 5.9% of the United States population. The country's 3.7 million Native Americans account for about 1%, and some 574 native tribes are recognized by the federal government. In 2024, the median age of the United States population was 39.1 years.

=== Urbanization ===
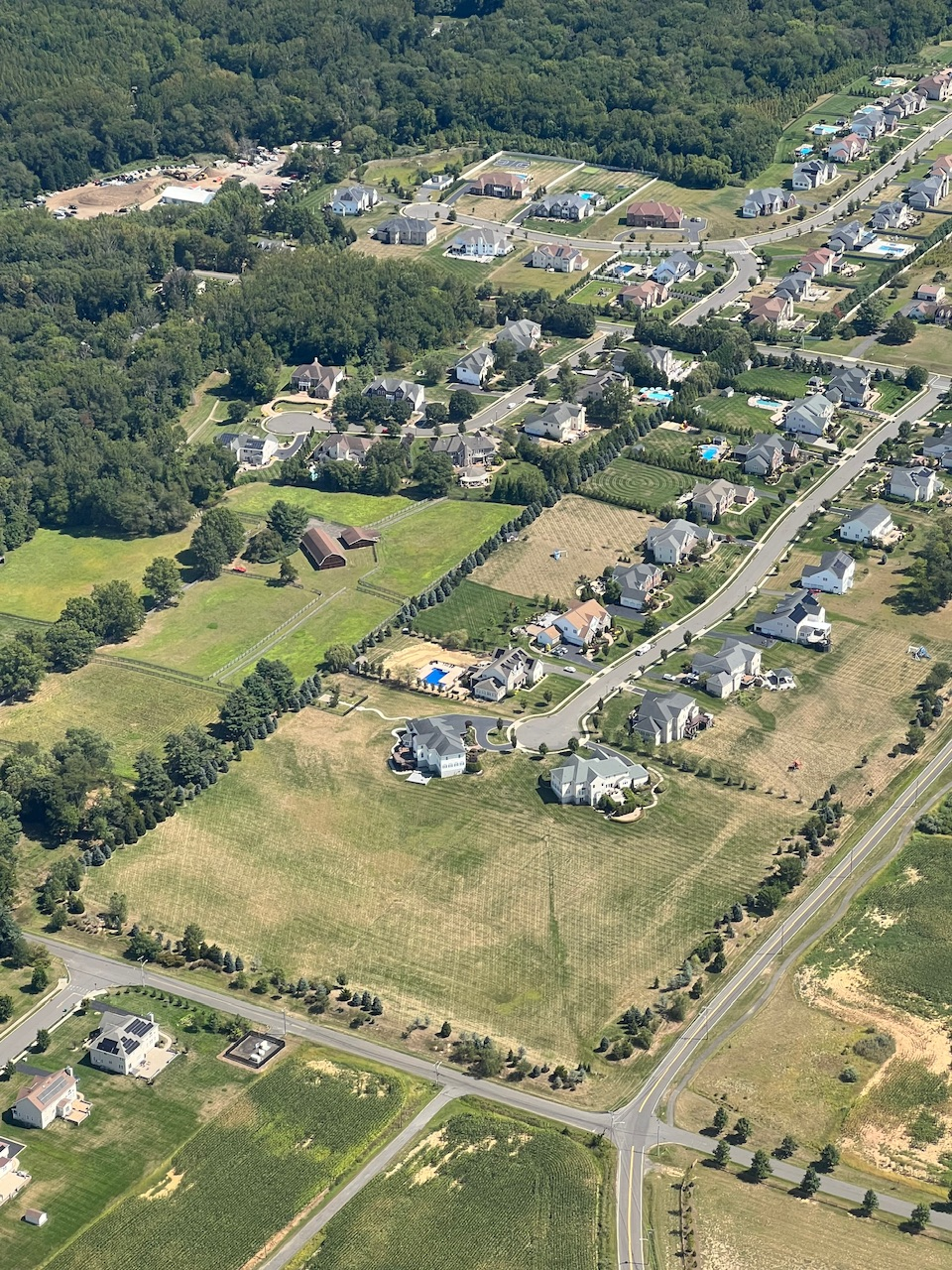
Most Americans live in suburbs and exurbs, such as Monroe Township, New Jersey, in the New York metropolitan area.

About 82% of Americans live in metropolitan areas, particularly in suburbs and outer-ring exurbs; about half of those reside in cities with populations over 50,000. In 2024, 346 incorporated U.S. municipalities had populations over 100,000, 11 cities had more than one million residents, and four cities—New York City, Los Angeles, Chicago, and Houston—had populations exceeding two million. Some 56 U.S. metropolitan areas have one million or more residents.

More recently, the fastest-growing metropolitan areas were in the South, while southern metros along the Mexican border and Gulf Coast metros susceptible to hurricanes declined the most in 2025. The New York metro area, which gained the most new residents in 2024, fell to 13th in 2025, due to a fall in immigrants. The top metro areas with rising populations in 2025 were Houston and Dallas–Fort Worth, followed by Atlanta, Phoenix and Charlotte.

Largest metropolitan areas in the United States 2025 MSA population estimates from the U.S. Census Bureau
Rank	Name	Region	Pop.	Rank	Name	Region	Pop.
1	New York	Northeast	20,112,448	11	Boston	Northeast	5,034,221
2	Los Angeles	West	12,844,441	12	Riverside–San Bernardino	West	4,769,007
3	Chicago	Midwest	9,434,123	13	San Francisco	West	4,630,041
4	Dallas–Fort Worth	South	8,477,157	14	Detroit	Midwest	4,390,913
5	Houston	South	7,904,627	15	Seattle	West	4,161,883
6	Atlanta	South	6,482,182	16	Minneapolis–Saint Paul	Midwest	3,790,295
7	Washington, D.C.	South	6,465,724	17	Tampa–St. Petersburg	South	3,418,895
8	Miami	South	6,391,072	18	San Diego	West	3,282,248
9	Philadelphia	Northeast	6,329,118	19	Denver	West	3,092,037
10	Phoenix	West	5,228,938	20	Orlando	South	2,957,672

=== Immigration ===
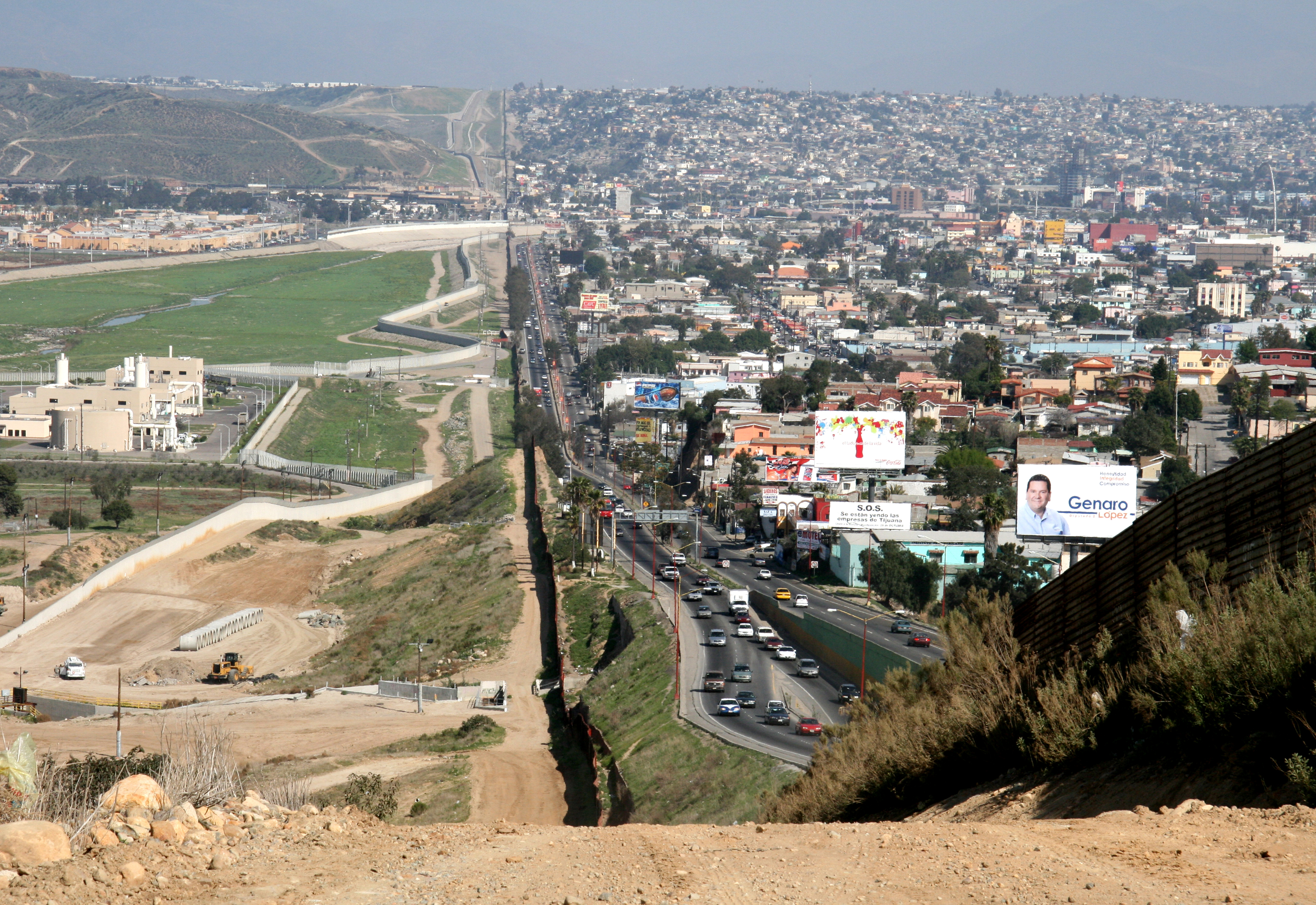
The Mexico–United States border wall between San Diego (left) and Tijuana (right)

America's immigrant population is by far the world's largest in absolute terms. In 2022, there were 87.7 million immigrants and U.S.-born children of immigrants in the United States, accounting for nearly 27% of the overall U.S. population. In 2017, out of the U.S. foreign-born population, some 45% (20.7 million) were naturalized citizens, 27% (12.3 million) were lawful permanent residents, 6% (2.2 million) were temporary lawful residents, and 23% (10.5 million) were unauthorized immigrants. In 2019, the top countries of origin for immigrants were Mexico (24% of immigrants), India (6%), China (5%), the Philippines (4.5%), and El Salvador (3%). In fiscal year 2022, over one million immigrants (most of whom entered through family reunification) were granted legal residence. The undocumented immigrant population in the U.S. reached a record high of 14 million in 2023.

=== Language ===
Most spoken languages in the U.S.

While many languages and dialects are spoken in the United States, English is by far the most commonly spoken and written. In 2025, Executive Order 14224 declared English the official language. However, the U.S. has never had a statutory official language, as Congress has never passed a law to designate English as official for all three federal branches. Some laws, such as U.S. naturalization requirements, nonetheless standardize English. Twenty-eight states and the United States Virgin Islands have laws that designate English as the sole official language; 19 states and the District of Columbia have no official language. Three states and four U.S. territories have recognized local or indigenous languages in addition to English: Hawaii (Hawaiian), Alaska (twenty Native languages), (Note: Inupiaq, Siberian Yupik, Central Alaskan Yup'ik, Alutiiq, Unanga (Aleut), Denaʼina, Deg Xinag, Holikachuk, Koyukon, Upper Kuskokwim, Gwichʼin, Tanana, Upper Tanana, Tanacross, Hän, Ahtna, Eyak, Tlingit, Haida, and Tsimshian) South Dakota (Sioux), American Samoa (Samoan), Puerto Rico (Spanish), Guam (Chamorro), and the Northern Mariana Islands (Carolinian and Chamorro). In total, 169 Native American languages are spoken in the United States. In Puerto Rico, Spanish is more widely spoken than English.

According to the American Community Survey (2020), some 245.4 million people in the U.S. age five and older spoke only English at home. About 41.2 million spoke Spanish at home, making it the second most commonly used language. Other languages spoken at home by one million people or more include Chinese (3.40 million), Tagalog (1.71 million), Vietnamese (1.52 million), Arabic (1.39 million), French (1.18 million), Korean (1.07 million), and Russian (1.04 million). German, spoken by 1 million people at home in 2010, fell to 881,000 estimated total speakers in 2020.

=== Religion ===
Religious affiliation in the U.S., according to a 2025 Gallup poll:
1. Protestantism (32%)
2. Catholicism (20%)
3. Non-specific Christian (12%)
4. Mormonism (1%)
5. Judaism (2%)
6. Other religion (6%)
7. Unaffiliated (24%)
8. Unanswered (3%)

The First Amendment guarantees the free exercise of religion in the country and forbids Congress from passing laws respecting its establishment. Religious practice is widespread, among the most diverse in the world, and profoundly vibrant.

The country has the world's largest Christian population, which includes the fourth-largest population of Catholics. Other notable faiths include Judaism, Buddhism, Hinduism, Islam, New Age, and Native American religions. Religious practice varies significantly by region. "Ceremonial deism" is common in American culture.

The overwhelming majority of Americans believe in a higher power or spiritual force, engage in spiritual practices such as prayer, and consider themselves religious or spiritual. In the Southern United States' "Bible Belt", evangelical Protestantism plays a significant role culturally; New England and the Western United States tend to be more secular. Mormonism, a Restorationist movement founded in the U.S. in 1830, is the predominant religion in Utah and a major religion in Idaho.

=== Education ===
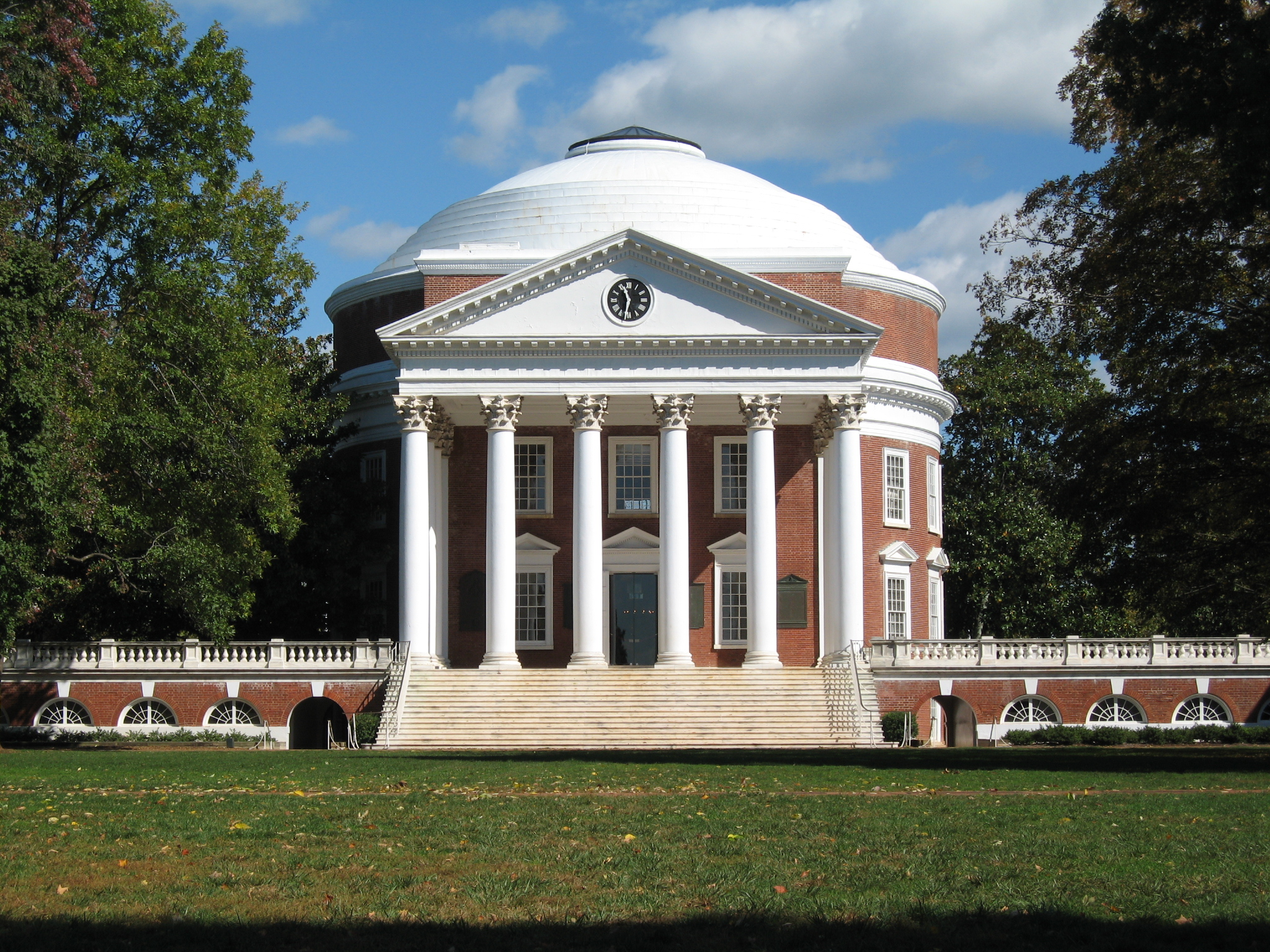
Some 77% of American college students attend public institutions such as the University of Virginia, founded by Thomas Jefferson in 1819.

American primary and secondary education, known in the U.S. as K–12 ("kindergarten through 12th grade"), is decentralized. School systems are operated and largely funded by state, territorial, and sometimes municipal governments and regulated by the U.S. Department of Education. In general, children are required to attend school or an approved homeschool from the age of five or six (kindergarten or first grade) until they are 18 years old. This often brings students through the 12th grade, the final year of a U.S. high school, but some states and territories allow them to withdraw earlier without earning a diploma, at age 16 or 17. The U.S. spends more on education per student than any other country, an average of $18,614 per year per public elementary and secondary school student in 2020–2021, though actual spending on individual students varied greatly depending on the community. Among Americans age 25 and older, 92.2% graduated from high school, 62.7% attended some college, 37.7% earned a bachelor's degree, and 14.2% earned a graduate degree. The U.S. literacy rate is near-universal. The U.S. has produced the most Nobel Prize winners of any country, with 411 (having won 413 awards).

U.S. tertiary or higher education has earned a global reputation. Many of the world's top universities, as listed by various ranking organizations, are in the United States, including 19 of the top 25. American higher education is dominated by state university systems, although the country's many private universities and colleges enroll about 20% of all American students. Local community colleges generally offer open admissions, lower tuition, and coursework leading to an associate degree or a non-degree certificate.

As for public expenditures on higher education, the U.S. spends more per student than the OECD average, and Americans spend more than all nations in combined public and private spending. Colleges and universities directly funded by the federal government do not charge tuition and are limited to military personnel and government employees, including: the U.S. service academies, the Naval Postgraduate School, and military staff colleges. Despite some student loan forgiveness programs in place, student loan debt increased by 102% between 2010 and 2020, and exceeded $1.7 trillion in 2022.

=== Health ===
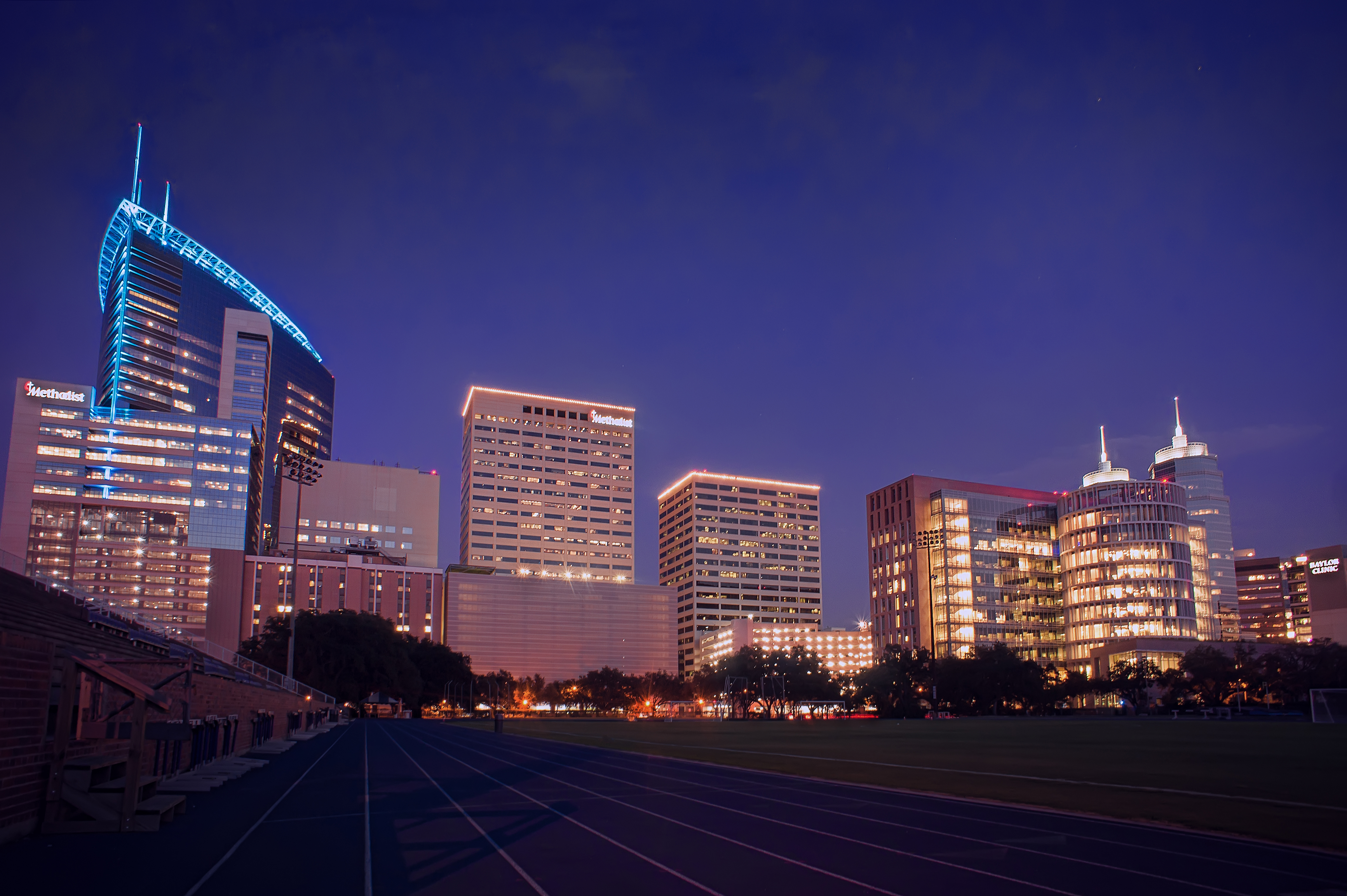
The Texas Medical Center in Houston is the largest medical complex in the world. In 2018, it employed 120,000 people and treated 10 million patients.

According to the Centers for Disease Control and Prevention (CDC), average U.S. life expectancy at birth reached 79.0 years in 2024, its highest recorded level and an increase of 0.6 years over 2023. The CDC attributed the improvement mainly to lower mortality from unintentional injuries, COVID-19, heart disease, cancer, and homicide. Heart disease, cancer, and unintentional injuries remained the leading causes of death. In 2024, life expectancy at birth for American men rose to 76.5 years (+0.7 years compared to 2023), while life expectancy for women was 81.4 years (+0.3 years). Starting in 1998, life expectancy in the U.S. fell behind that of other wealthy industrialized countries, and Americans' "health disadvantage" gap has been increasing ever since.

The Commonwealth Fund reported in 2020 that the U.S. had the highest suicide rate among the 11 high-income countries included in its study. Obesity affected 40.3% of U.S. adults aged 20 and older in August 2021–August 2023. The U.S. healthcare system far outspends that of any other country, measured both in per capita spending and as a percentage of GDP, but attains worse healthcare outcomes when compared to peer countries for reasons that are debated. The United States is the only developed country without a system of universal healthcare, and a significant proportion of the population that does not carry health insurance. Government-funded healthcare coverage for the poor (Medicaid) and for those age 65 and older (Medicare) is available to Americans who meet the programs' income or age qualifications. In 2010, President Barack Obama signed the Patient Protection and Affordable Care Act into law. (Note: Also known less formally as Obamacare) Since the 2022 U.S. Supreme Court decision Dobbs v. Jackson Women's Health Organization, which effectively overruled Roe v. Wade (1973), abortion in the United States is no longer federally protected but is subject to the laws of each state or territory. (Note: As of April 2, 2026, 41 states restricted abortion at specific stages of pregnancy; of these, 12 restricted abortion beginning at fetal viability and 13 restricted it from conception.)

== Culture and society ==
The Statue of Liberty on Liberty Island in New York Harbor was an 1886 gift from France that has become an iconic symbol of the American Dream.

The United States is home to a wide variety of ethnic groups, traditions, and customs. The country has been described as having the values of individualism and personal autonomy, as well as a strong work ethic and competitiveness. Voluntary altruism toward others also plays a major role; according to a 2016 study by the Charities Aid Foundation, Americans donated 1.44% of total GDP to charity—the highest rate in the world by a large margin. Americans have traditionally been characterized by a unifying political belief in an "American Creed" that emphasizes consent of the governed, liberty, equality under the law, democracy, social equality, property rights, and a preference for limited government. (Note: See American Creed, written by William Tyler Page and adopted by Congress in 1918.) The U.S. has acquired significant hard and soft power through its diplomatic influence, economic power, military alliances, and cultural exports such as American movies, music, video games, sports, and food. The influence that the United States exerts on other countries through soft power is referred to as Americanization.

Nearly all present Americans or their ancestors came from Europe, Africa, or Asia (the "Old World") within the past five centuries. Mainstream American culture is a Western culture largely derived from the traditions of European immigrants with influences from many other sources, such as traditions brought by slaves from Africa. More recent immigration from Asia and especially Latin America has added to a cultural mix that has been described as a homogenizing melting pot, and a heterogeneous salad bowl, with immigrants contributing to, and often assimilating into, mainstream American culture.

Under the First Amendment to the Constitution, the United States is considered to have the strongest protections of free speech of any country. Flag desecration, hate speech, blasphemy, and lese majesty are all forms of protected expression. A 2016 Pew Research Center poll found that Americans were the most supportive of free expression of any polity measured. Additionally, they are the "most supportive of freedom of the press and the right to use the Internet without government censorship". The U.S. is a socially progressive country with permissive attitudes surrounding human sexuality. LGBTQ rights in the United States are among the most advanced by global standards.

The American Dream, or the perception that Americans enjoy high levels of social mobility, plays a key role in attracting immigrants. Whether this perception is accurate has been a topic of debate. While mainstream culture holds that the United States is a classless society, scholars identify significant differences between the country's social classes, affecting socialization, language, and values. Americans tend to greatly value socioeconomic achievement, but being ordinary or average is promoted by some as a noble condition as well.

The National Foundation on the Arts and the Humanities is an agency of the United States federal government that was established in 1965 with the purpose to "develop and promote a broadly conceived national policy of support for the humanities and the arts in the United States, and for institutions which preserve the cultural heritage of the United States".

=== Literature ===
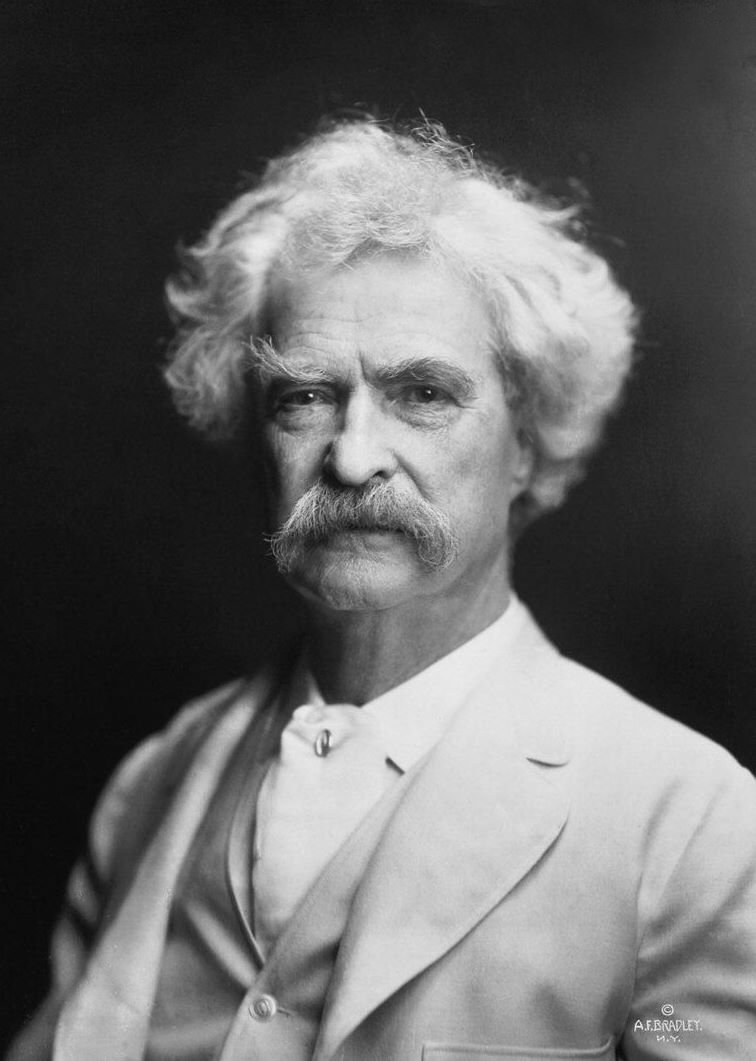
Mark Twain, whom William Faulkner called "the father of American literature"

Colonial American authors were influenced by John Locke and other Enlightenment philosophers. The American Revolutionary Period (1765–1783) is notable for the political writings of Benjamin Franklin, Alexander Hamilton, Thomas Paine, and Thomas Jefferson. Shortly before and after the Revolutionary War, the newspaper rose to prominence, filling a demand for anti-British national literature. An early novel is William Hill Brown's The Power of Sympathy, published in 1789. Writer and critic John Neal in the early- to mid-19th century helped advance America toward a unique literature and culture by criticizing predecessors such as Washington Irving for imitating their British counterparts, and by influencing writers such as Edgar Allan Poe, who took American poetry and short fiction in new directions. Ralph Waldo Emerson and Margaret Fuller pioneered the influential Transcendentalism movement; Henry David Thoreau, author of Walden, was influenced by this movement.

The conflict surrounding abolitionism inspired writers, like Harriet Beecher Stowe, and authors of slave narratives, such as Frederick Douglass. Nathaniel Hawthorne's The Scarlet Letter (1850) explored the dark side of American history, as did Herman Melville's Moby-Dick (1851). Major American poets of the 19th century American Renaissance include Walt Whitman, Melville, and Emily Dickinson. Mark Twain was the first major American writer to be born in the West. Henry James achieved international recognition with novels like The Portrait of a Lady (1881). As literacy rates rose, periodicals published more stories centered around industrial workers, women, and the rural poor. Naturalism, regionalism, and realism were the major literary movements of the period.

While modernism generally took on an international character, modernist authors working within the United States more often rooted their work in specific regions, peoples, and cultures. Following the Great Migration to northern cities, African-American and black West Indian authors of the Harlem Renaissance developed an independent tradition of literature that rebuked a history of inequality and celebrated black culture. An important cultural export during the Jazz Age, these writings were a key influence on Négritude, a philosophy emerging in the 1930s among francophone writers of the African diaspora. In the 1950s, an ideal of homogeneity led many authors to attempt to write the Great American Novel, while the Beat Generation rejected this conformity, using styles that elevated the impact of the spoken word over mechanics to describe drug use, sexuality, and the failings of society. Contemporary literature is more pluralistic than in previous eras, with the closest thing to a unifying feature being a trend toward self-conscious experiments with language. Twelve American laureates have won the Nobel Prize in Literature.

=== Mass media ===
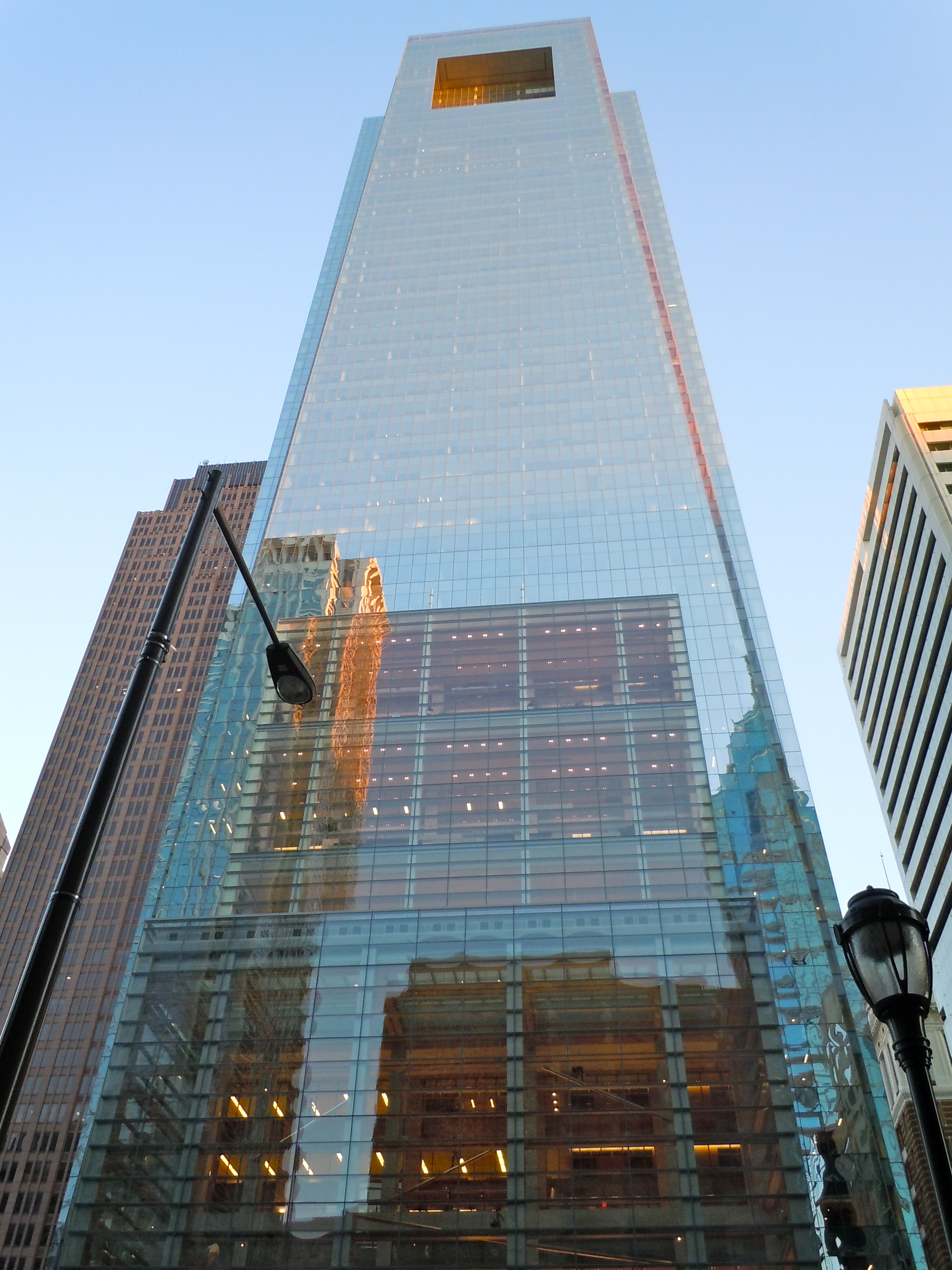
Comcast Center in Philadelphia, headquarters of Comcast, one of the world's largest telecommunications companies and media conglomerates

The four major broadcasters in the U.S. are the National Broadcasting Company (NBC), Columbia Broadcasting System (CBS), American Broadcasting Company (ABC), and Fox Broadcasting Company (Fox). The four major broadcast television networks are all commercial entities. The Public Broadcasting Service (PBS) is the country's major non-commercial public broadcast network; it also provides educational programming through local PBS stations. The U.S. cable television system offers hundreds of channels catering to a variety of niches. In 2021, about 83% of Americans over age 12 listened to broadcast radio, while about 40% listened to podcasts. In the prior year, there were 15,460 licensed full-power radio stations in the U.S. according to the Federal Communications Commission (FCC). Public radio broadcasting is largely supplied by National Public Radio (NPR), incorporated in February 1970 under the Public Broadcasting Act of 1967.

U.S. newspapers with a global reach and reputation include The Wall Street Journal, The New York Times, The Washington Post, and USA Today. About 800 publications are produced in Spanish. With few exceptions, newspapers are privately owned, either by large chains such as Gannett or McClatchy, which own dozens or even hundreds of newspapers; by small chains that own a handful of papers; or, in an increasingly rare situation, by individuals or families. Major cities often have alternative newspapers to complement the mainstream daily papers, such as The Village Voice in New York City and LA Weekly in Los Angeles. The five most-visited websites in the world are Google, YouTube, Facebook, Instagram, and ChatGPT—all of them American-owned. Other popular platforms used include X (formerly Twitter) and Amazon. In 2025, the U.S. was the world's second-largest video game market by revenue (after China). In 2015, the U.S. video game industry consisted of 2,457 companies that employed around 220,000 jobs and generated $30.4 billion in revenue. There are 444 game publishers, developers, and hardware companies in California alone. In the Game Developers Conference (GDC) 2025 survey, 58% of responding game developers were based in the U.S.

Media freedom was classified as "problematic" by Reporters Without Borders in 2026, and scholars have noted a significant rise in censorship and self-censorship in recent years.

=== Theater ===
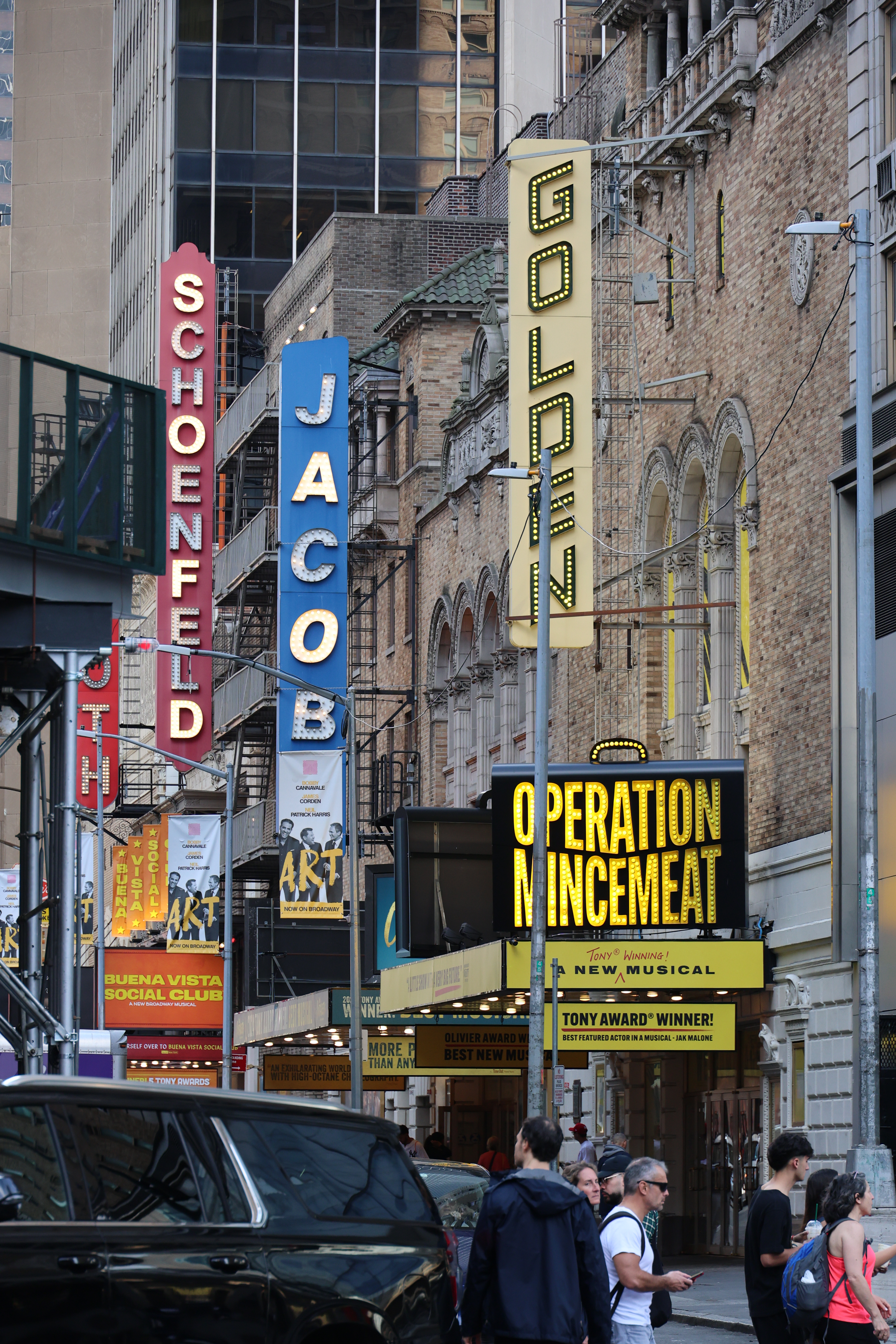
Broadway theaters in Theater District, Manhattan

The United States is well known for its theater. Mainstream theater in the United States derives from the old European theatrical tradition and has been heavily influenced by the British theater. By the middle of the 19th century, America had created new distinct dramatic forms in the Tom Shows, the showboat theater and the minstrel show. The central hub of the American theater scene is the Theater District in Manhattan, with its divisions of Broadway, off-Broadway, and off-off-Broadway.

Many movie and television celebrities have gotten their big break working in New York productions. Outside New York City, many cities have professional regional or resident theater companies that produce their own seasons. The biggest-budget theatrical productions are musicals. U.S. theater has an active community theater culture.

The Tony Awards recognize excellence in live Broadway theater and are presented at an annual ceremony in Manhattan. The awards are given for Broadway productions and performances. One is also given for regional theater.

=== Visual arts ===
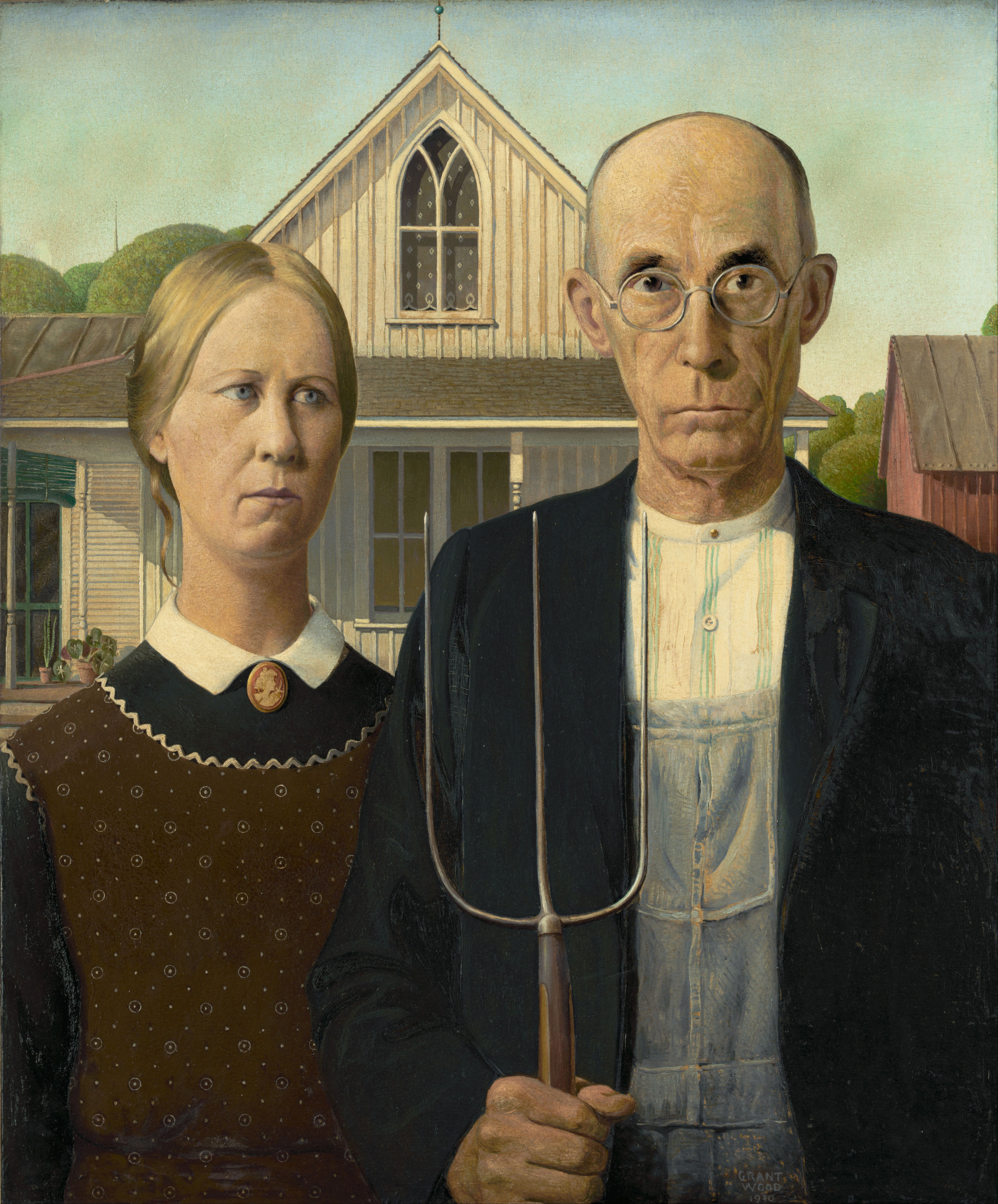
American Gothic (1930) by Grant Wood is one of the most famous American paintings and is widely parodied.

Folk art in colonial America grew out of artisanal craftsmanship in communities that allowed commonly trained people to individually express themselves. It was distinct from Europe's tradition of high art, which was less accessible and generally less relevant to early American settlers. Cultural movements in art and craftsmanship in colonial America generally lagged behind those of Western Europe. For example, the prevailing medieval style of woodworking and primitive sculpture became integral to early American folk art, despite the emergence of Renaissance styles in England in the late 16th and early 17th centuries. The new English styles would have been early enough to make a considerable impact on American folk art, but American styles and forms had already been firmly adopted. Not only did styles change slowly in early America, but there was a tendency for rural artisans there to continue their traditional forms longer than their urban counterparts did—and far longer than those in Western Europe.

The Hudson River School was a mid-19th-century movement in the visual arts tradition of European naturalism. The 1913 Armory Show in New York City, an exhibition of European modernist art, shocked the public and transformed the U.S. art scene.

American Realism and American Regionalism sought to reflect and give America new ways of looking at itself. Georgia O'Keeffe, Marsden Hartley, and others experimented with new and individualistic styles, which would become known as American modernism. Major artistic movements such as the abstract expressionism of Jackson Pollock and Willem de Kooning and the pop art of Andy Warhol and Roy Lichtenstein developed largely in the United States. Major photographers include Alfred Stieglitz, Edward Steichen, Dorothea Lange, Edward Weston, James Van Der Zee, Ansel Adams, and Gordon Parks.

The tide of modernism and then postmodernism has brought global fame to American architects, including Frank Lloyd Wright, Philip Johnson, and Frank Gehry. The Metropolitan Museum of Art in Manhattan is the largest art museum in the United States and the fourth-largest in the world.

=== Music ===
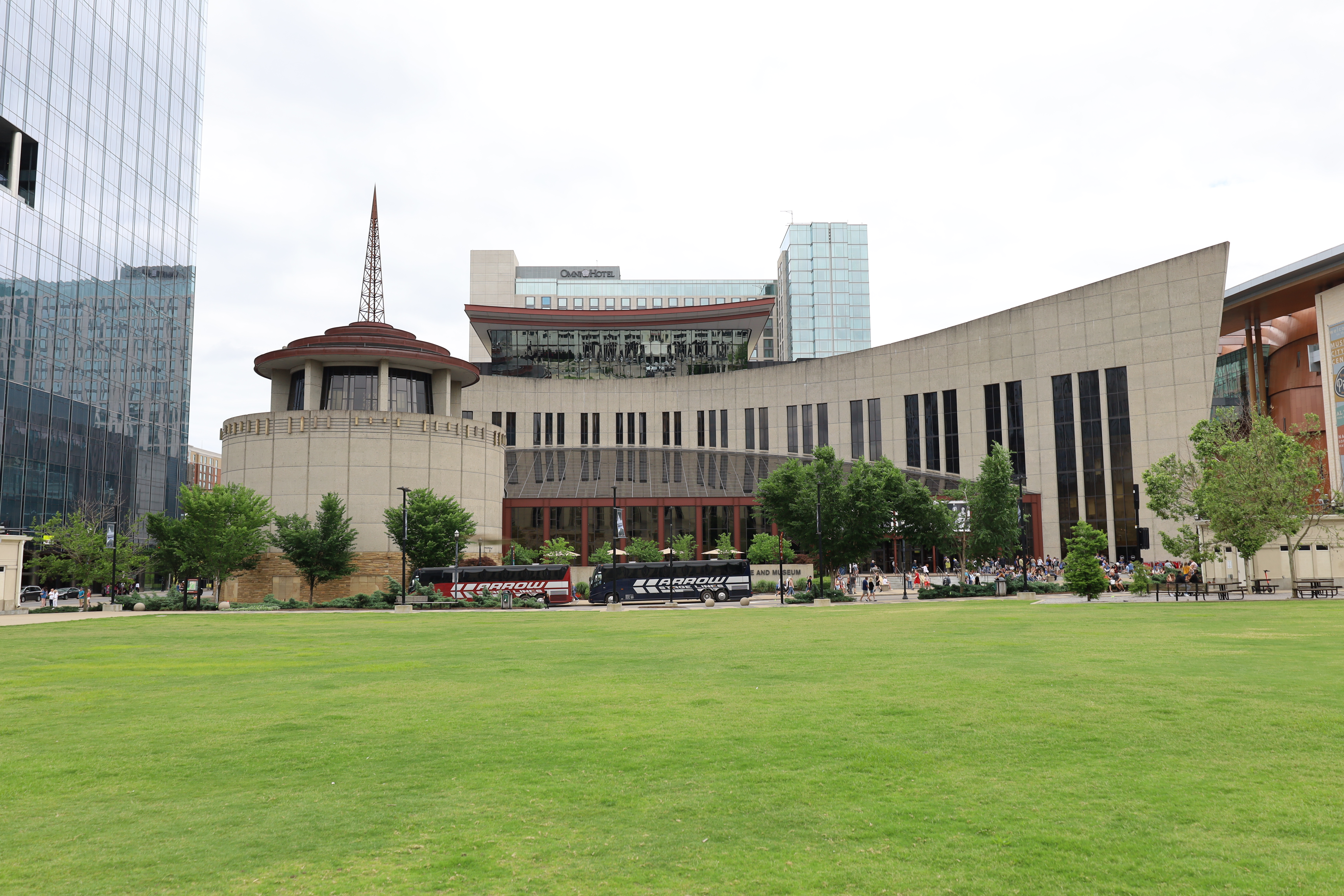
The Country Music Hall of Fame and Museum in Nashville, Tennessee

American folk music encompasses numerous music genres, variously known as traditional music, traditional folk music, contemporary folk music, or roots music. Many traditional songs have been sung within the same family or folk group for generations, and sometimes trace back to such origins as the British Isles, mainland Europe, or Africa. The rhythmic and lyrical styles of African-American music in particular have influenced American music. Banjos were brought to America through the slave trade. Minstrel shows incorporating the instrument into their acts led to its increased popularity and widespread production in the 19th century. The electric guitar, first invented in the 1930s, and mass-produced by the 1940s, had an enormous influence on popular music, in particular due to the development of rock and roll. The synthesizer, turntablism, and electronic music were also largely developed in the U.S.

Elements from folk idioms such as the blues and old-time music were adopted and transformed into popular genres with global audiences. Jazz grew from blues and ragtime in the early 20th century, developing from the innovations and recordings of composers such as W.C. Handy and Jelly Roll Morton. Louis Armstrong and Duke Ellington increased its popularity early in the 20th century. Country music developed in the 1920s, bluegrass and rhythm and blues in the 1940s, and rock and roll in the 1950s. In the 1960s, Bob Dylan emerged from the folk revival to become one of the country's most celebrated songwriters. The musical forms of punk and hip hop both originated in the United States in the 1970s.

The United States has the world's largest music market, with a total retail value of $15.9 billion in 2022, and is the largest exporter of music. Most of the world's major record companies are based in the U.S.; they are represented by the Recording Industry Association of America (RIAA). Mid-20th-century American pop stars, such as Frank Sinatra and Elvis Presley, became global celebrities and best-selling music artists, as have artists of the late 20th century, such as Michael Jackson, Madonna, Whitney Houston, and Mariah Carey, and of the early 21st century, such as Eminem, Britney Spears, Lady Gaga, Katy Perry, Taylor Swift and Beyoncé.

=== Fashion ===
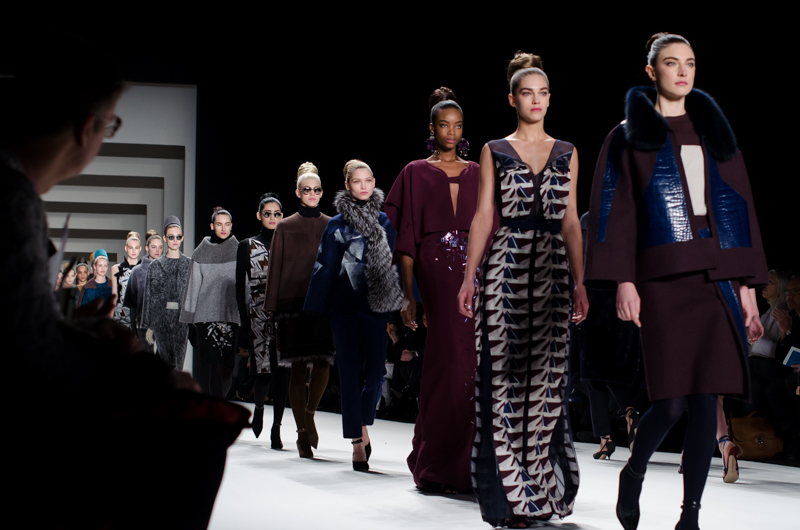
Haute couture fashion models on the catwalk during New York Fashion Week

The United States has the world's largest apparel market by revenue. Apart from professional business attire, American fashion is eclectic and predominantly informal. Americans' diverse cultural roots are reflected in their clothing; however, sneakers, jeans, T-shirts, and baseball caps are emblematic of American styles. New York, with its Fashion Week, is considered to be one of the "Big Four" global fashion capitals, along with Paris, Milan, and London. The annual Met Gala in Manhattan has been called the fashion world's "biggest night".

A number of well-known designer labels, among them Tommy Hilfiger, Ralph Lauren, Tom Ford and Calvin Klein, are headquartered in Manhattan. Labels cater to niche markets, such as preteens. A study demonstrated that general proximity to Manhattan's Garment District has been synonymous with American fashion since its inception in the early 20th century.

=== Cinema ===
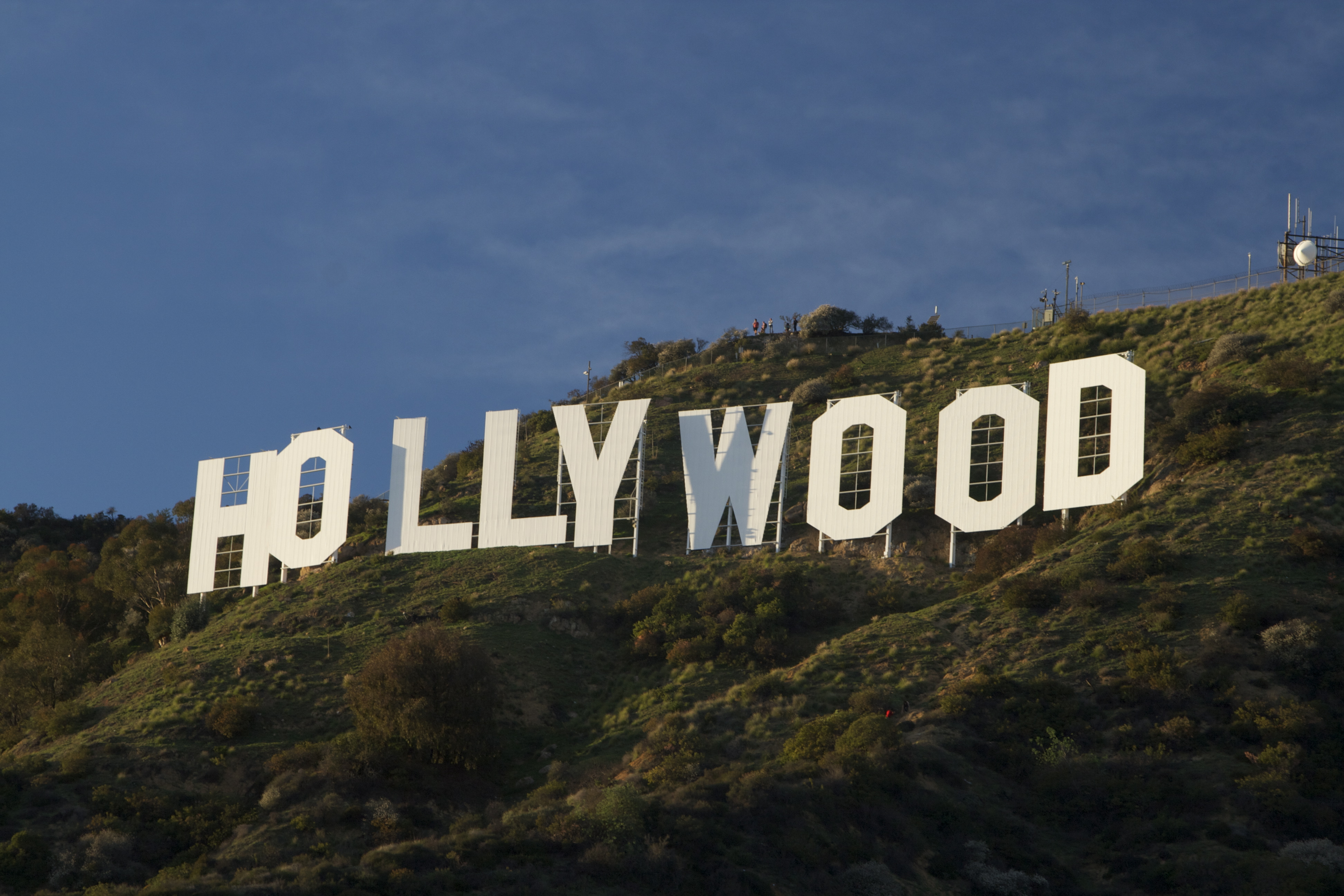
The Hollywood Sign in the Hollywood Hills, often regarded as the symbol of the American film industry

The U.S. film industry has a worldwide influence and following. Hollywood, a district in central Los Angeles, the nation's second-most populous city, is also metonymous for the American filmmaking industry. The major film studios of the United States are the primary source of the most commercially successful movies selling the most tickets in the world.

Largely centered in the New York City region from its beginnings in the late 19th century through the first decades of the 20th century, the U.S. film industry has since been primarily based in and around Hollywood. Nonetheless, American film companies have been subject to the forces of globalization in the 21st century, and an increasing number of films are made elsewhere. The Academy Awards, popularly known as "the Oscars", have been held annually by the Academy of Motion Picture Arts and Sciences since 1929, and the Golden Globes have been held annually since January 1944.

The industry peaked in what is commonly referred to as the "Golden Age of Hollywood", from the early sound period until the early 1960s, with screen actors such as John Wayne and Marilyn Monroe becoming iconic figures. In the 1970s, "New Hollywood", or the "Hollywood Renaissance", was defined by grittier films influenced by French and Italian realist pictures of the post-war period. The 21st century has been marked by the rise of American streaming platforms, which came to rival traditional cinema.

=== Cuisine ===
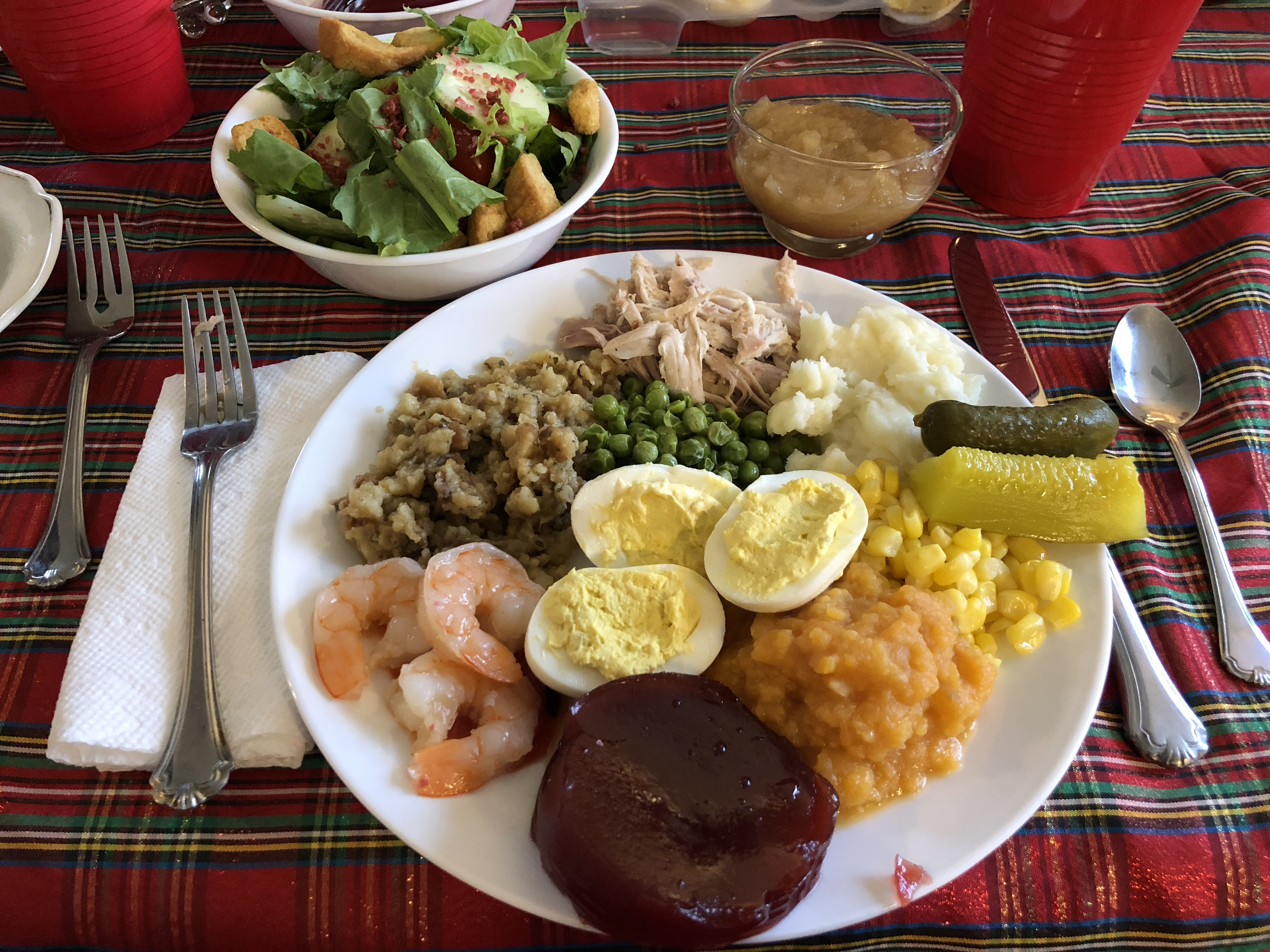
A Thanksgiving dinner with roast turkey, mashed potatoes, pickles, corn, candied yams, cranberry jelly, shrimps, stuffing, green peas, deviled eggs, green salad, and apple sauce

Early settlers were introduced by Native Americans to foods such as turkey, sweet potatoes, corn, squash, and maple syrup. Of the most enduring and pervasive examples are variations of the native dish called succotash. Early settlers and later immigrants combined these with foods they were familiar with, such as wheat flour, beef, and milk, to create a distinctive American cuisine. New World crops, especially pumpkin, corn, potatoes, and turkey as the main course are part of a shared national menu on Thanksgiving, when many Americans prepare or purchase traditional dishes to celebrate the occasion.

Characteristic American dishes such as apple pie, fried chicken, doughnuts, french fries, macaroni and cheese, ice cream, hamburgers, hot dogs, and American pizza derive from the recipes of various immigrant groups. Mexican dishes such as burritos and tacos preexisted the United States in areas later annexed from Mexico, and adaptations of Chinese cuisine as well as pasta dishes freely adapted from Italian sources are all widely consumed.

American chefs have had a significant impact on society both domestically and internationally. In 1946, the Culinary Institute of America was founded by Katharine Angell and Frances Roth. This would become the United States' most prestigious culinary school, where many of the most talented American chefs would study prior to successful careers. The United States restaurant industry was projected at $899 billion in sales for 2020, and employed more than 15 million people, representing 10% of the nation's workforce directly. It is the country's second-largest private employer and the third-largest employer overall. The United States is home to over 220 Michelin-starred restaurants, 14 of which were awarded three stars.

Wine has been produced in what is now the United States since the 1500s, with the first widespread production beginning in what is now New Mexico in 1628. In the modern U.S., wine production is undertaken in all fifty states, with California producing 84 percent of all U.S. wine. With more than 1,100,000 acres (4,500 km^{2}) under vine, the United States is the fourth-largest wine-producing country in the world, after Italy, Spain, and France.

The classic American diner, a casual restaurant type originally intended for the working class, emerged during the 19th century from converted railroad dining cars made stationary. The diner soon evolved into purpose-built structures whose number expanded greatly in the 20th century. The American fast-food industry developed alongside the nation's car culture. American restaurants developed the drive-in format in the 1920s, which they began to replace with the drive-through format by the 1940s. American fast-food restaurant chains, such as McDonald's, Burger King, Chick-fil-A, Kentucky Fried Chicken, Dunkin' Donuts and many others, have numerous outlets around the world.

=== Sports ===
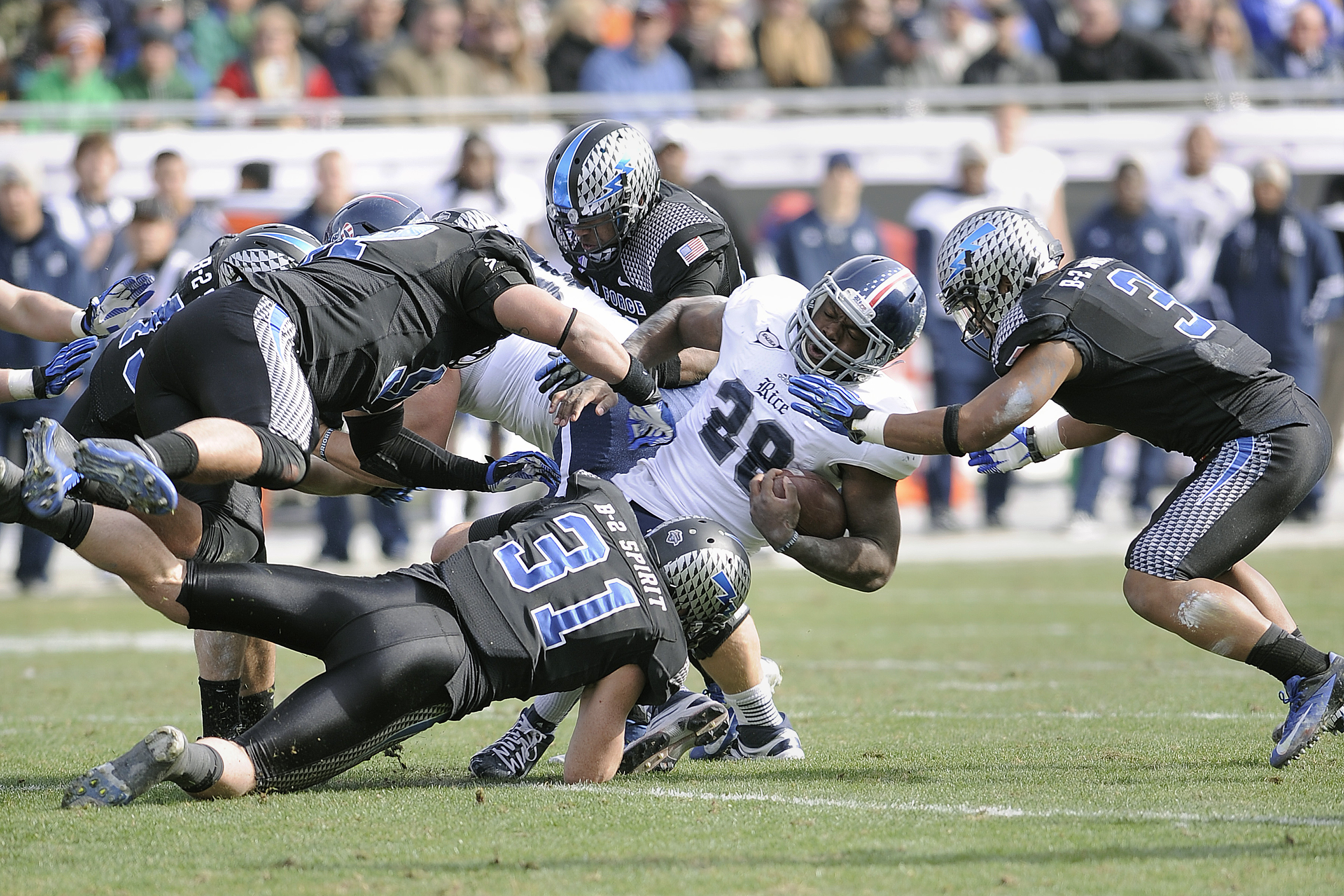
A collegiate-level game of American football, the most popular sport in the U.S.

The most popular spectator sports in the U.S. are American football, basketball, baseball, soccer, and ice hockey. Their premier leagues are, respectively, the National Football League, National Basketball Association, Major League Baseball, Major League Soccer, and the National Hockey League. All these leagues, excluding soccer, are considered to be preeminent in their respective sports worldwide.

While most major U.S. sports such as baseball and American football have evolved out of European practices, basketball, volleyball, skateboarding, and snowboarding are American inventions, many of which have become popular worldwide. Lacrosse and surfing arose from Native American and Native Hawaiian activities that predate European contact. The U.S. sports industry earned approximately $1.06 trillion in revenue in 2023, or roughly 40% of the global total.

American football is by several measures the most popular spectator sport in the United States; the NFL has the highest average attendance of any professional sports league in the world. Baseball has been regarded as the U.S. "national sport" since the late 19th century. The most-watched individual sports in the U.S. are golf and auto racing, particularly NASCAR and IndyCar.

On the collegiate level, the NCAA reported $1.1 billion in revenue for the 2017 fiscal year, and college football and basketball attract large audiences, as the NCAA March Madness tournament and the College Football Playoff are some of the most watched national sporting events. In the U.S., the intercollegiate sports level serves as the main feeder system for professional and Olympic sports, with significant exceptions such as Minor League Baseball. This differs greatly from practices in nearly all other countries, where publicly and privately funded sports organizations serve this function.

Eight Olympic Games have taken place in the United States, beginning with the 1904 Summer Olympics in St. Louis, Missouri. The U.S. is scheduled to host the 2028 Summer Olympics in Los Angeles and the 2034 Winter Olympics in Salt Lake City. U.S. athletes have won a total of 2,968 medals (1,179 gold) at the Olympic Games, the most of any country.

In other international competition, the United States is the home of a number of prestigious events, including the America's Cup, World Baseball Classic, the U.S. Open, and the Masters Tournament. The U.S. men's national soccer team has qualified for eleven World Cups, while the women's national team has won the FIFA Women's World Cup and Olympic soccer tournament four and five times, respectively. The U.S. hosted the World Cup in 1994 and co-hosted in 2026; it hosted the Women's World Cup in 1999 and will co-host in 2031.

== See also ==
- Lists of U.S. state topics
- Outline of the United States
