= Sculpture of the United States =

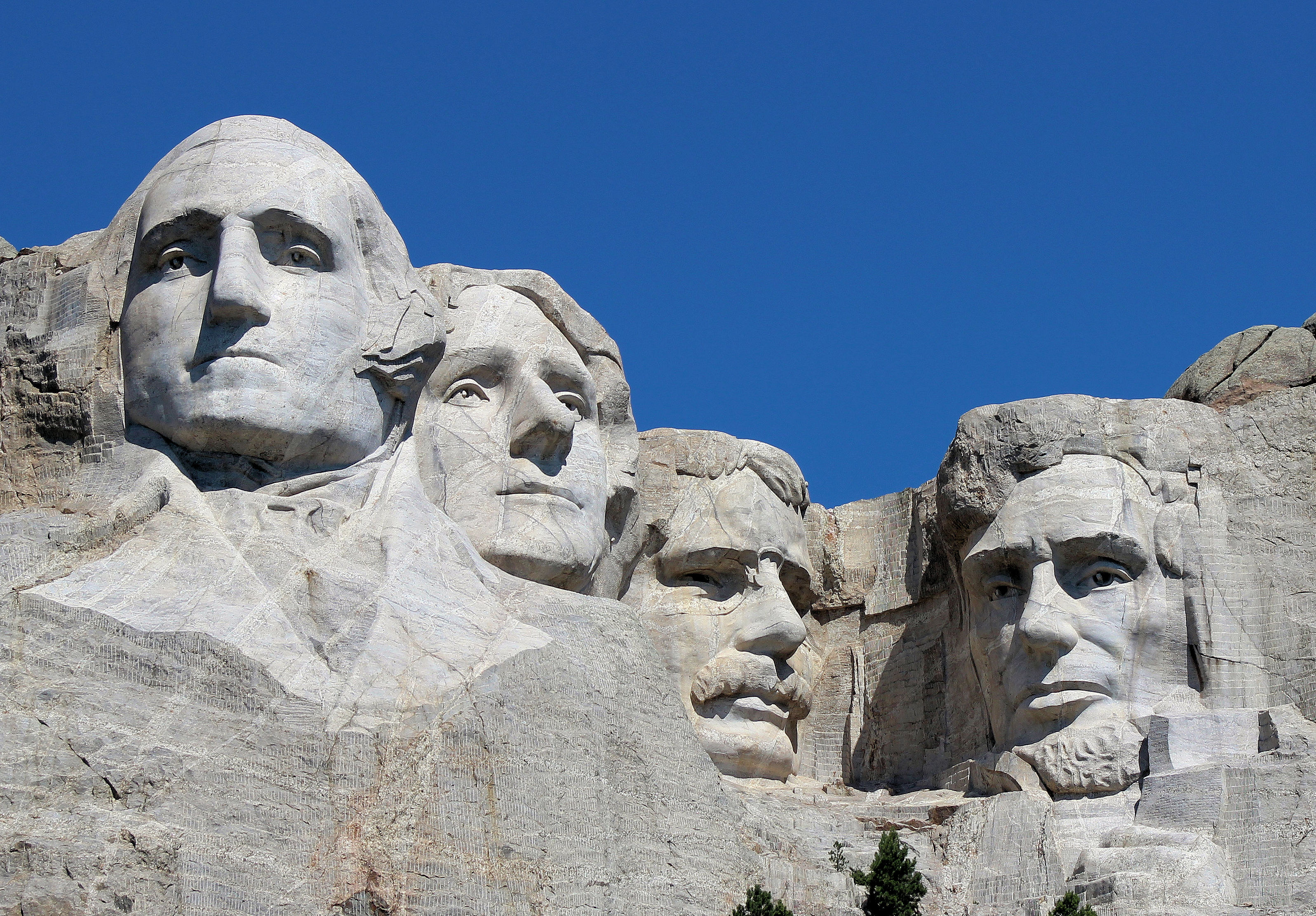
Mount Rushmore National Monument. Sculptures of George Washington, Thomas Jefferson, Theodore Roosevelt, and Abraham Lincoln represent the first 150 years of American history

The history of sculpture in the United States begins in the 1600s "with the modest efforts of craftsmen who adorned gravestones, Bible boxes, and various utilitarian objects with simple low-relief decorations." American sculpture in its many forms, genres and guises has continuously contributed to the cultural landscape of world art into the 21st century.

== Folk art ==
There is frequently art in well-made tombstones, iron products, furniture, toys, and tools—perhaps better reflecting the character of a people than sculptures made in classical styles for social elites. One of these specific applications, the carving of wooden figureheads for ships, started in the Americas as early as 1750 and a century later helped launch the careers of Samuel McIntyre and the country's first famous sculptor, William Rush (1756–1833) of Philadelphia. The tradition begun then continues today in the folk sculpture style known as Chainsaw carving.

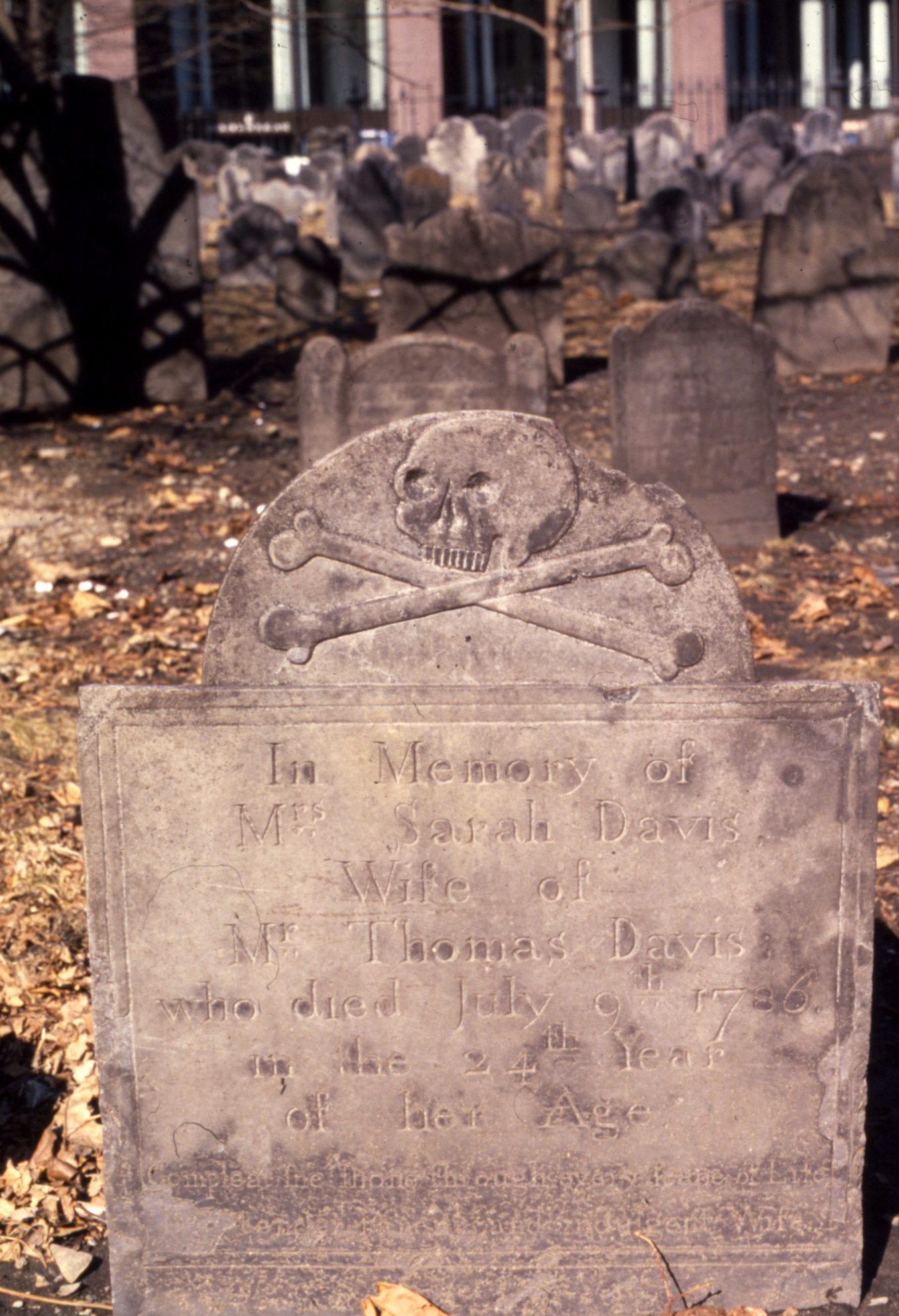
Gravestone from Boston, 1736 (?)

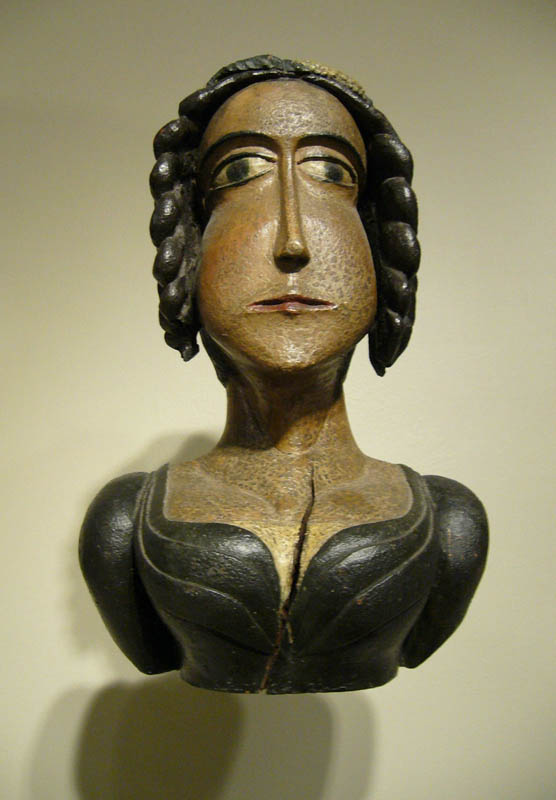
Ship's figurehead, artist unknown, c. 1830, Art Institute of Chicago

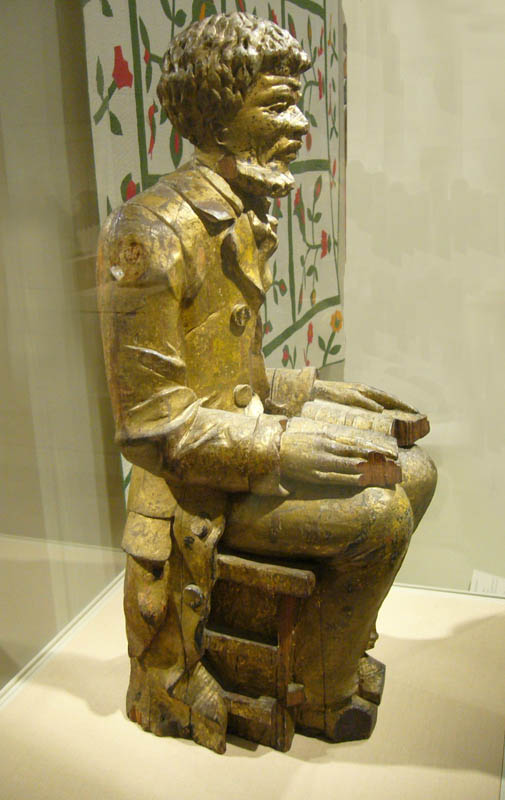
Preacher, c. 1830, Art Institute of Chicago

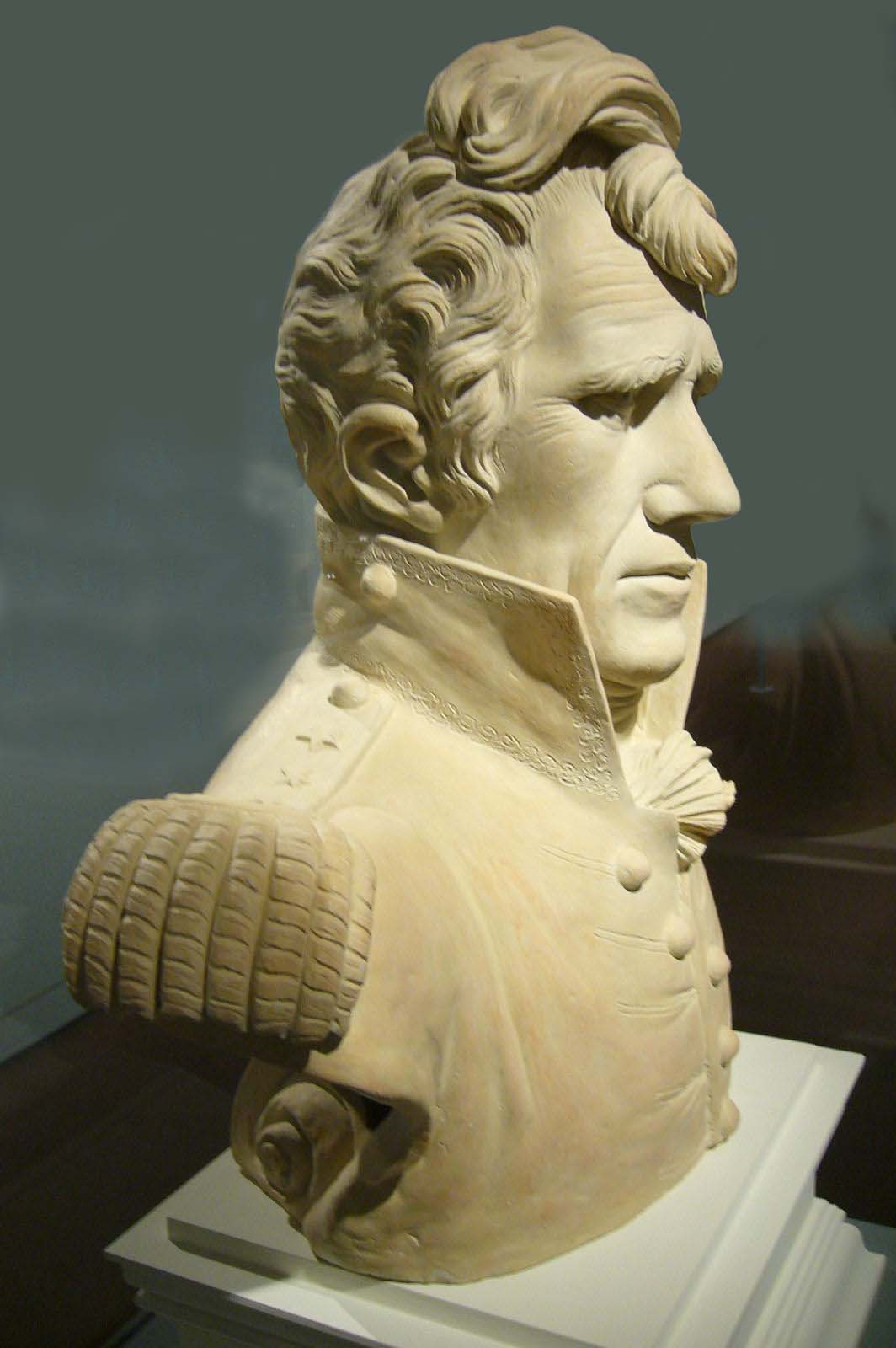
William Rush—portrait of General Andrew Jackson, 1815, Art Institute of Chicago

== The Italian years ==
In the 1830s, the first generation of notable American sculptors studied and lived in Italy, particularly in Florence and Rome, creating the Neoclassic style. At that time, Italy "provided the proper atmosphere, brought the sculptor close to the great monuments of antiquity, and provided museum collections that were available to study." They also gave the artists access to the carvers of Italy who translated their clay works into marble. During this period the themes from which the subjects of sculptural works were chosen tended to be drawn from antiquity, the exceptions being portraits (whose subjects were frequently shown wearing Roman or Greek garb) or works that included Native Americans. These artists included Horatio Greenough (1805–1852), Hiram Powers (1805–1873), Thomas Crawford (1814–1857), Thomas Ball (1819–1911) and his son-in-law William Couper (1853–1942), Harriet Hosmer (1830–1908), Chauncey Ives (1810–1894), Randolph Rogers (1825–1892) and (somewhat later) William Henry Rinehart (1825–1874).

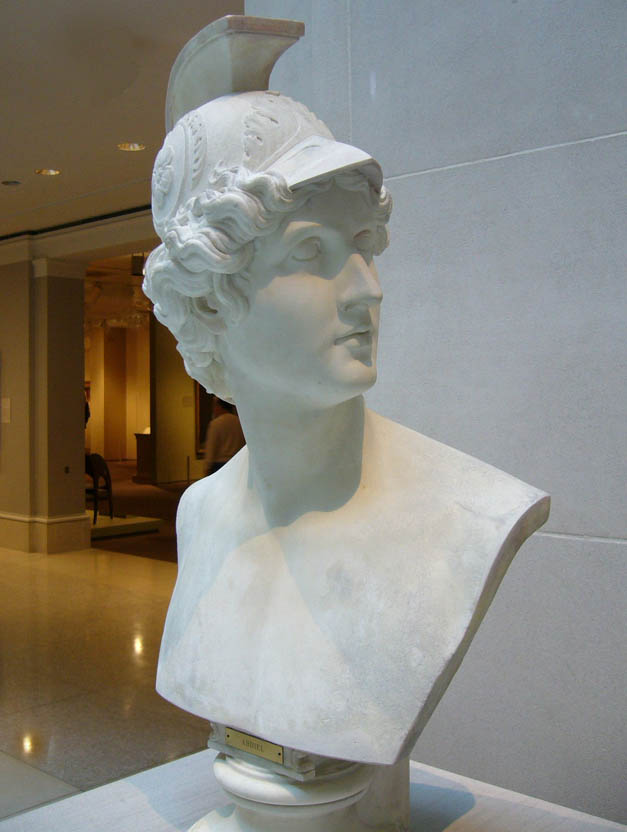
Horatio Greenough, Abdiel 1838–43

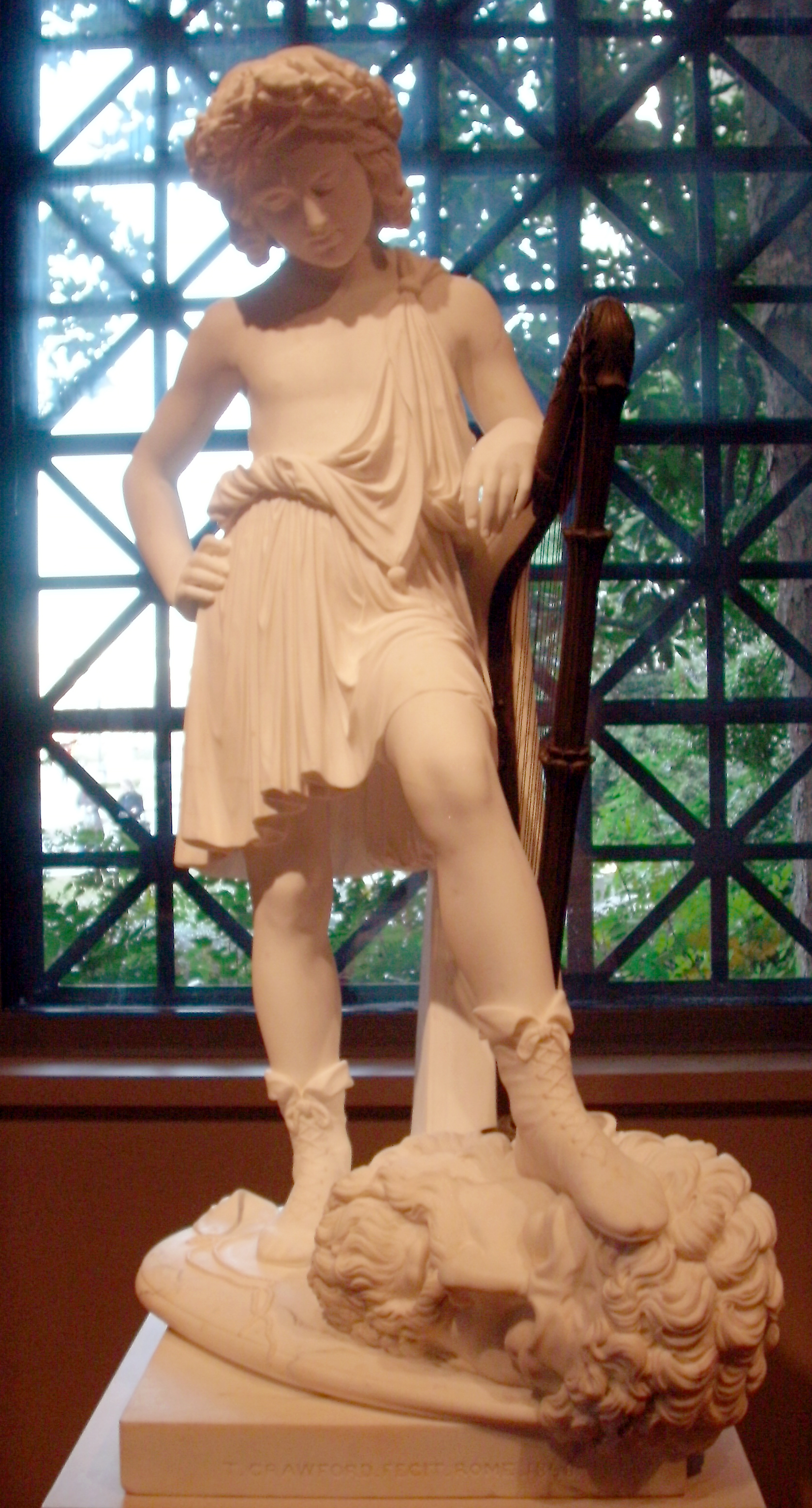
Thomas Crawford, David Triumphant, 1848

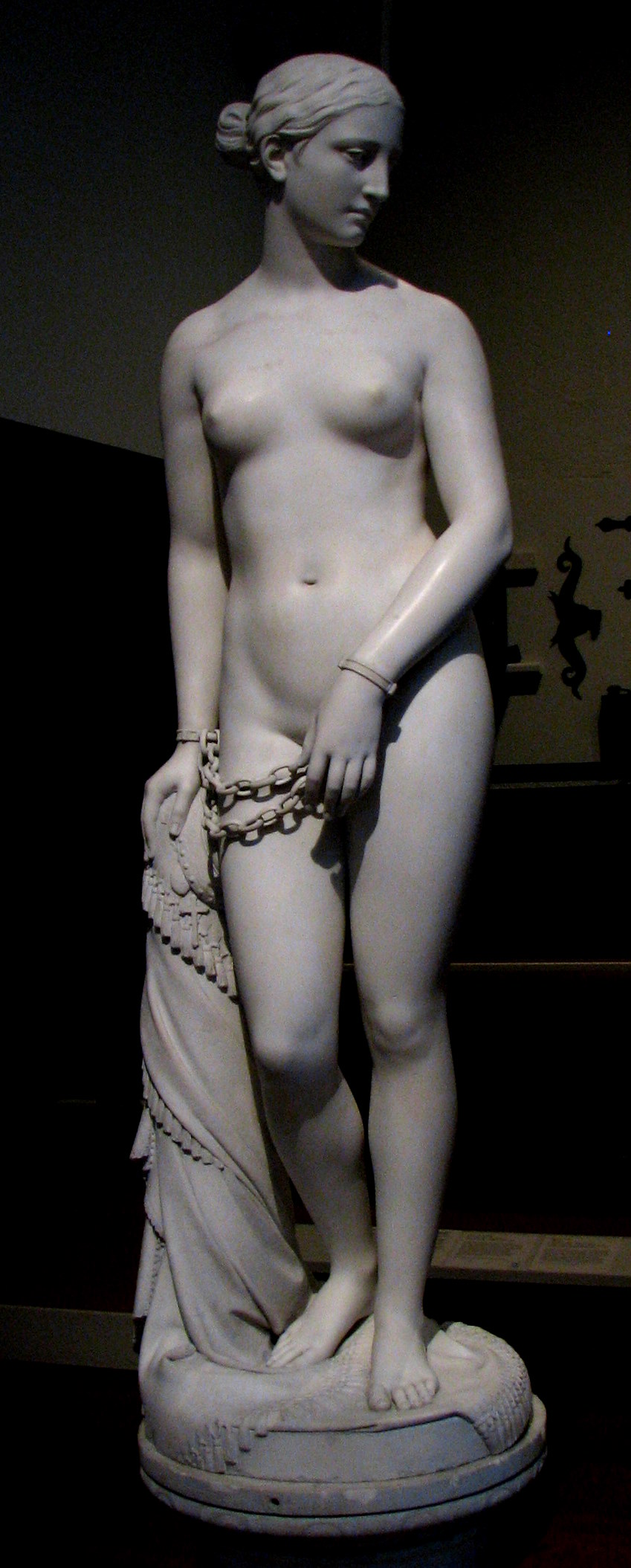
Hiram Powers — The Greek Slave, Raby Castle, 1844

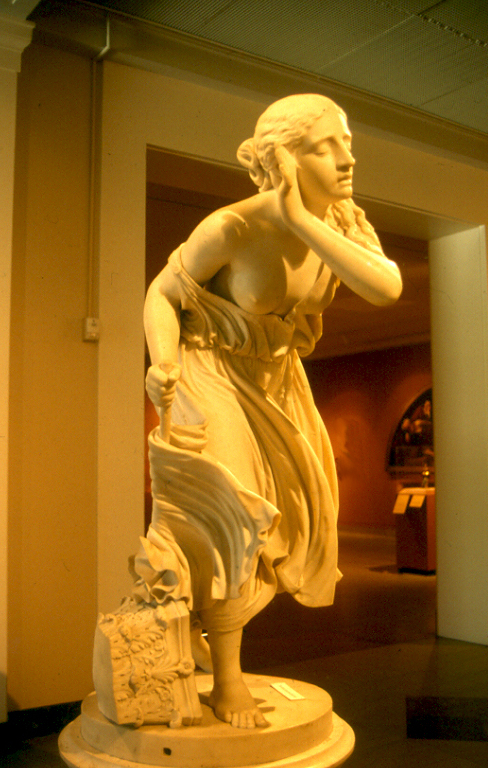
Randolph Rogers, Nydia, the Blind Flower Girl of Pompeii, 1856

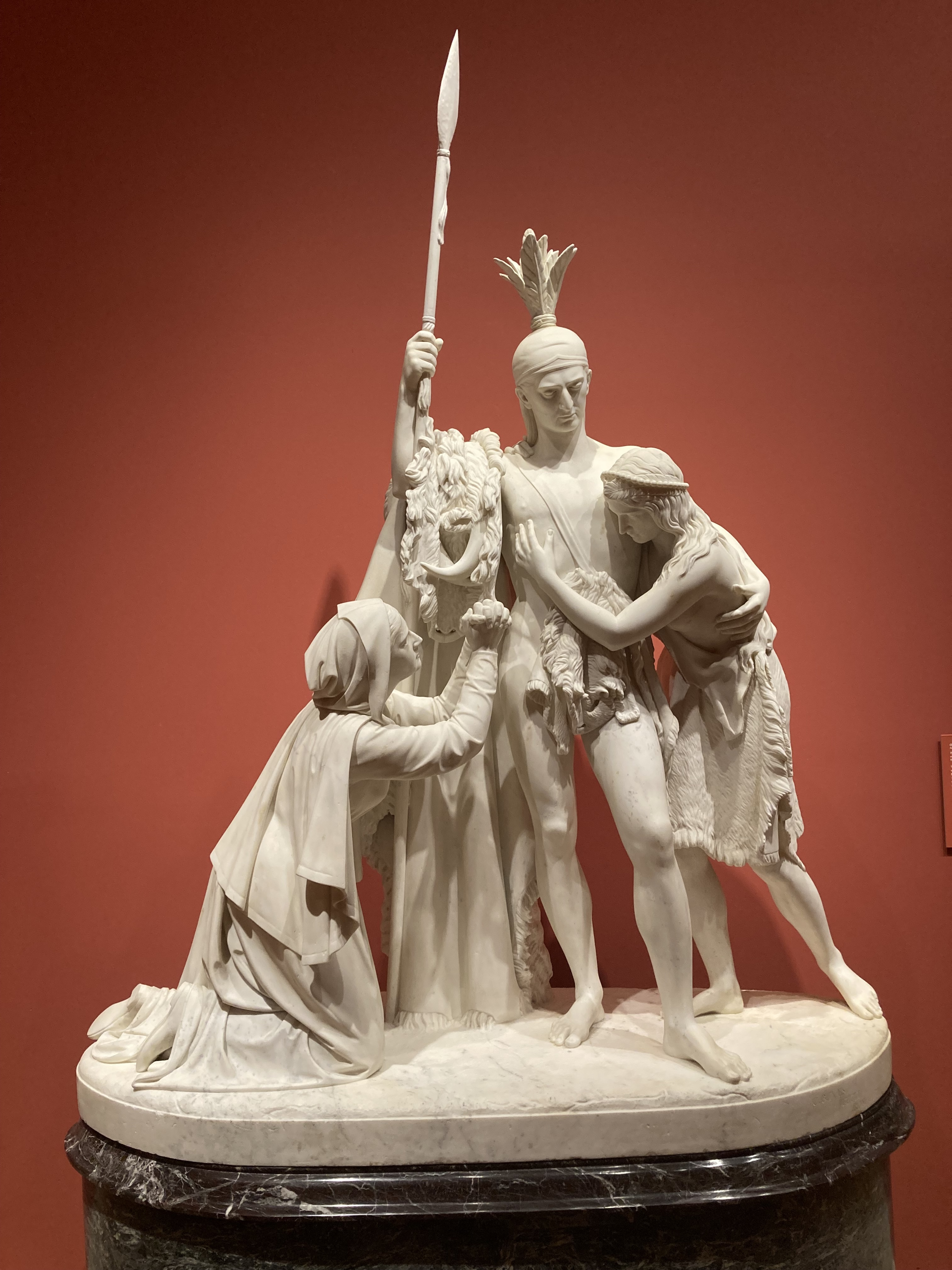
The Willing Captive by Chauncey Ives, 1871

== 19th-century American women sculptors ==
American women also became active sculptors during the Italian Period despite the sexism of the age. Among the women who acquired both commissions and fame were Edmonia Lewis, Harriet Hosmer, Anne Whitney, Vinnie Ream and Emma Stebbins).

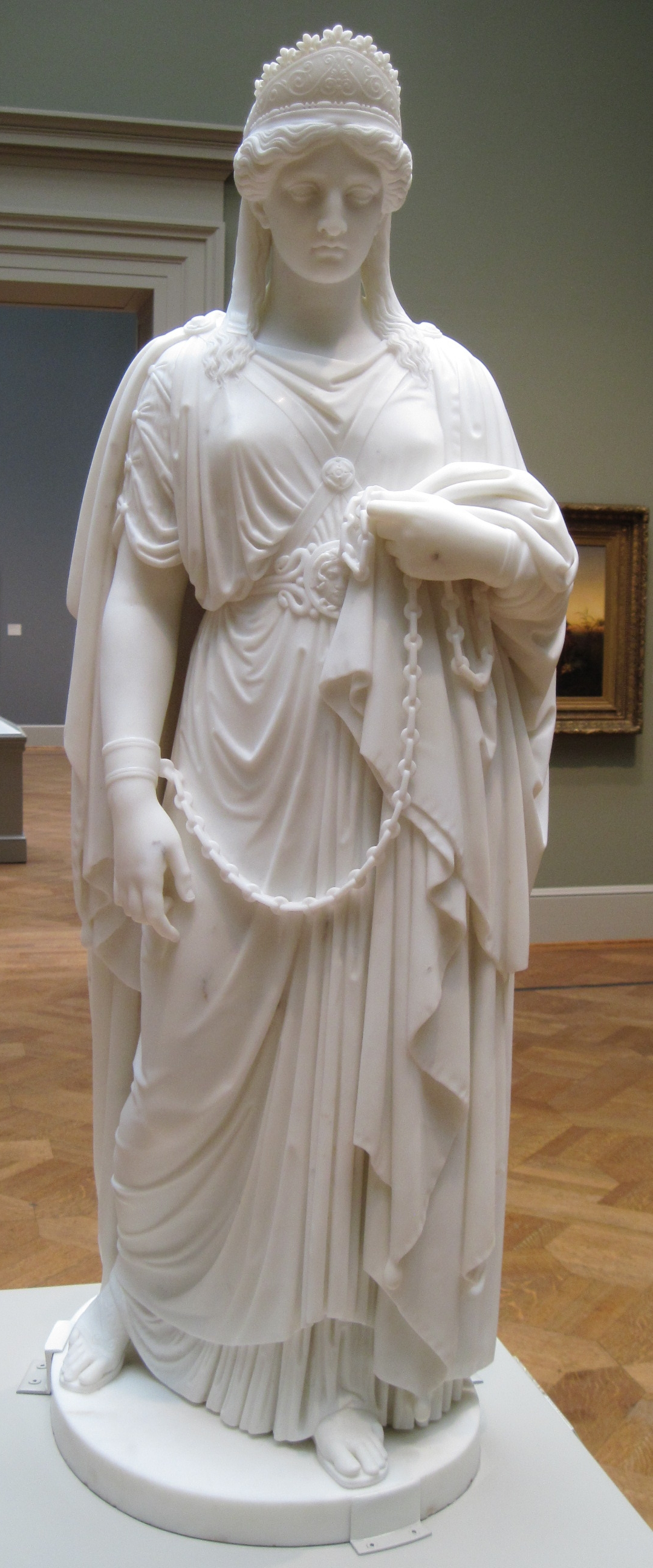
Harriet Hosmer, Zenobia in chains, 1857, Saint Louis Art Museum

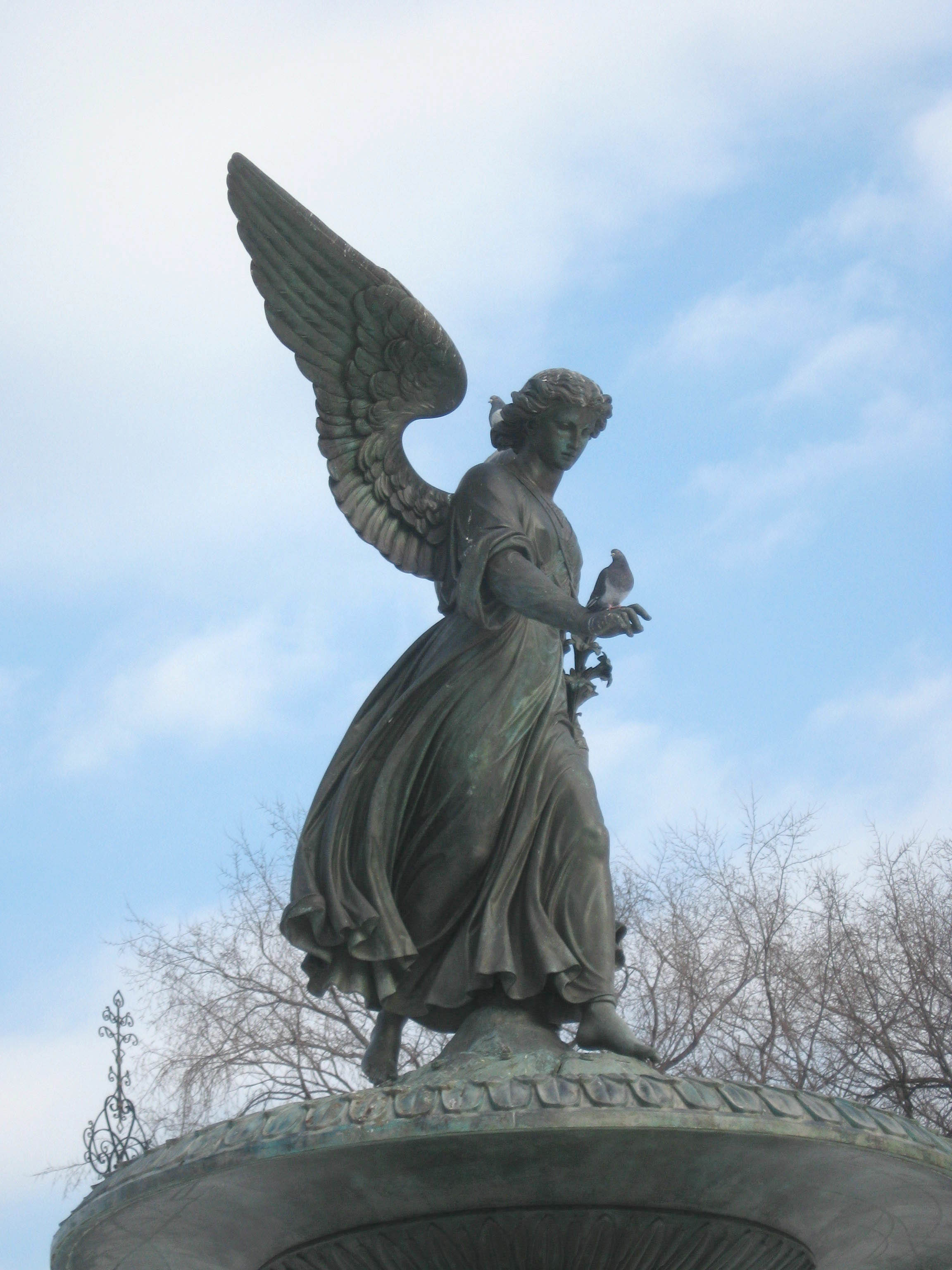
Emma Stebbins' Bethesda Fountain

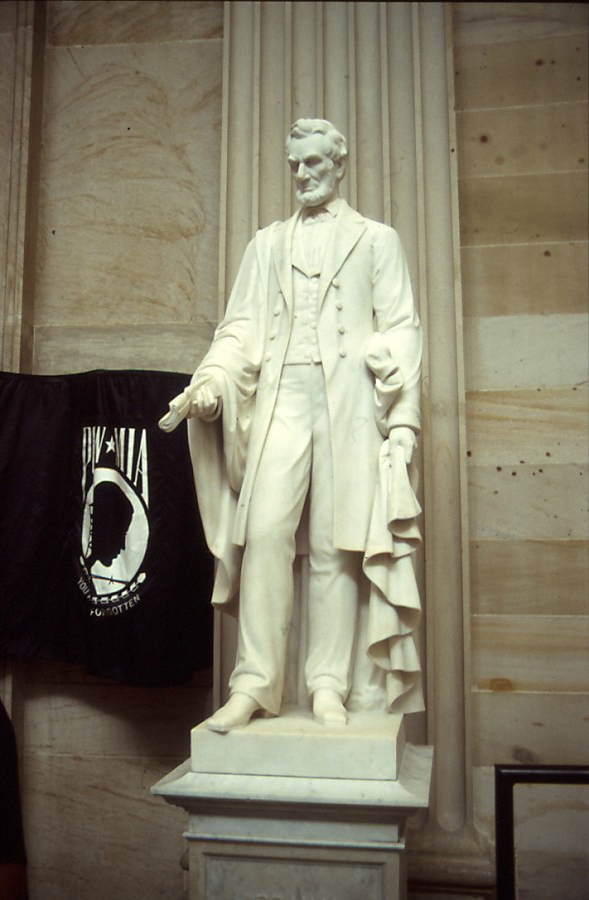
Vinnie Ream's Lincoln

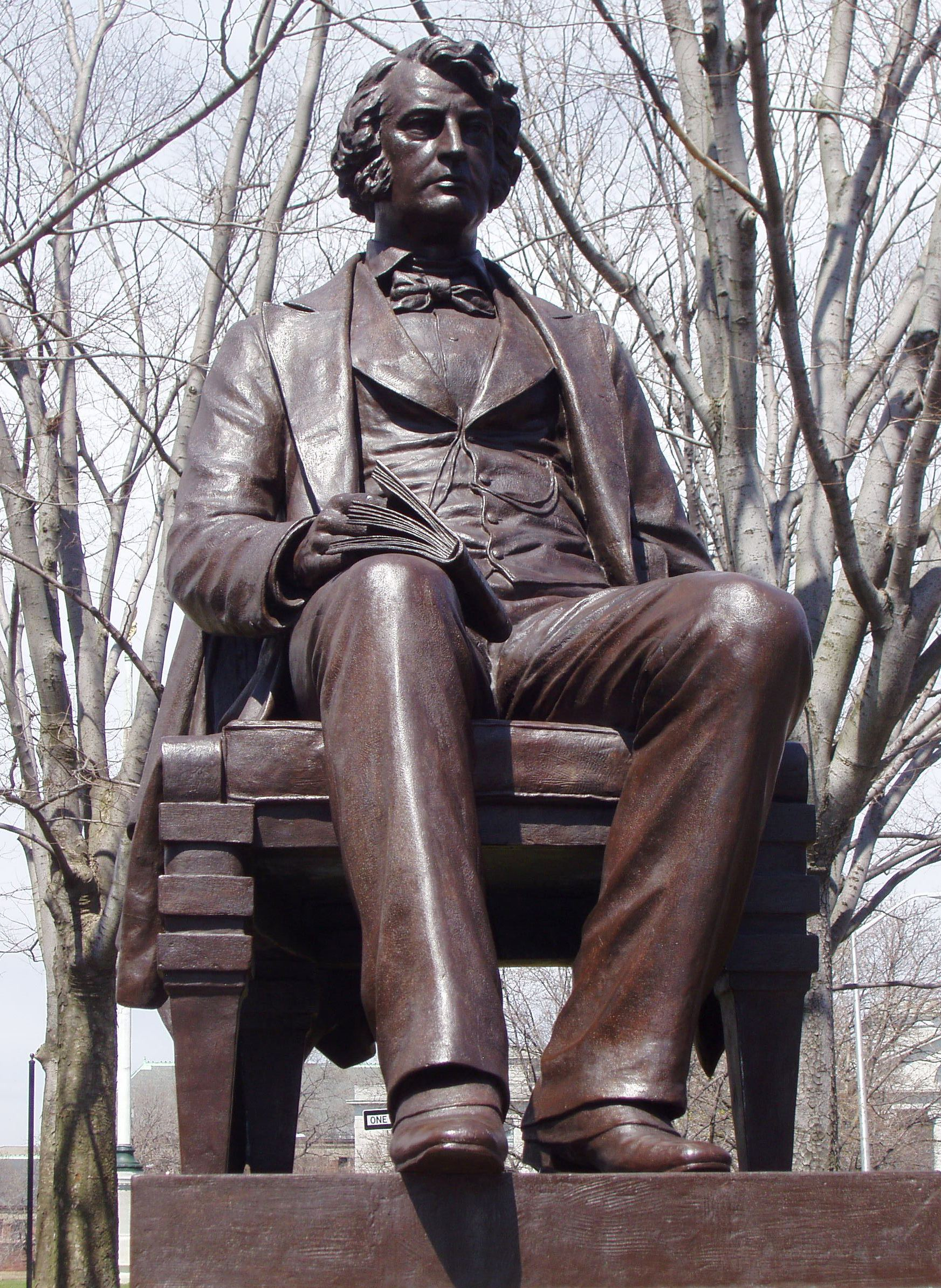
Charles Sumner by Anne Whitney

== The Paris years ==
In the decades following the Civil War American sculptors began more and more to go to Paris to study — falling in with the more naturalistic and dramatic style exemplified by the works of Jean-Baptiste Carpeaux (1827–1875) and Antoine-Louis Barye (1796–1875) and other French sculptors. Among these Americans were Augustus Saint-Gaudens, Frederick MacMonnies, and Daniel Chester French.

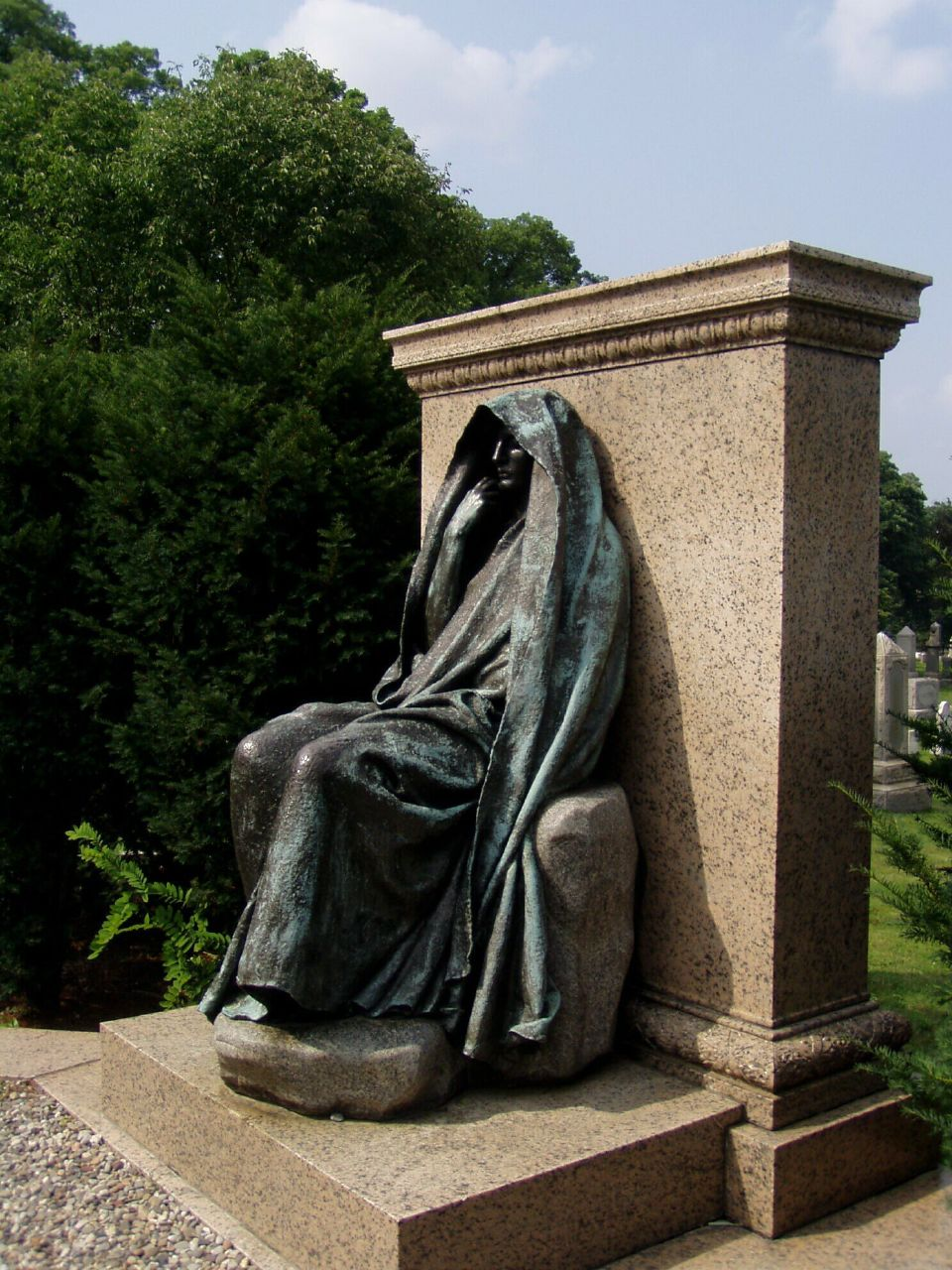
Adams Memorial 1891, by Augustus Saint-Gaudens

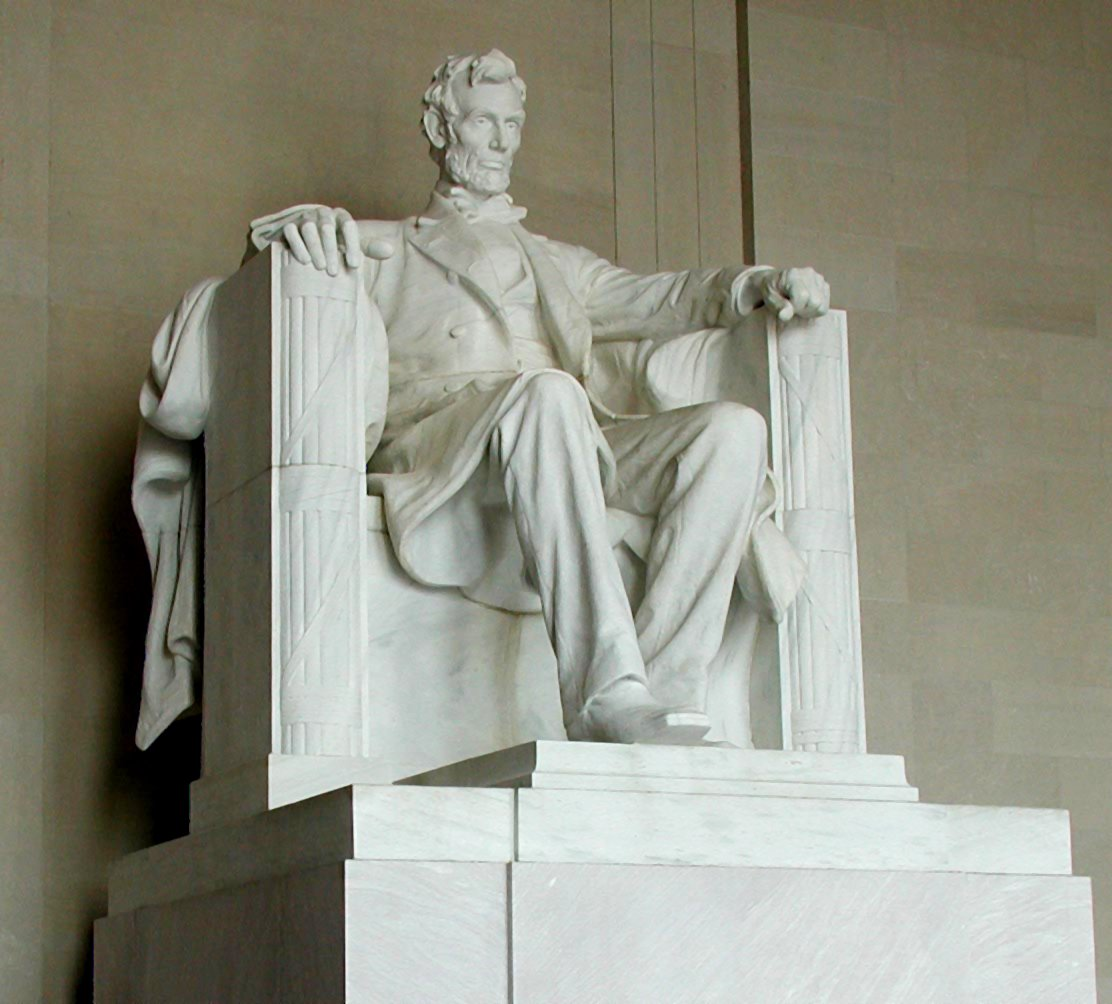
Abraham Lincoln, 1920, the Daniel Chester French sculpture at the Lincoln Memorial, Washington, D.C.

Lincoln (detail), 1916, Daniel Chester French, Art Institute of Chicago

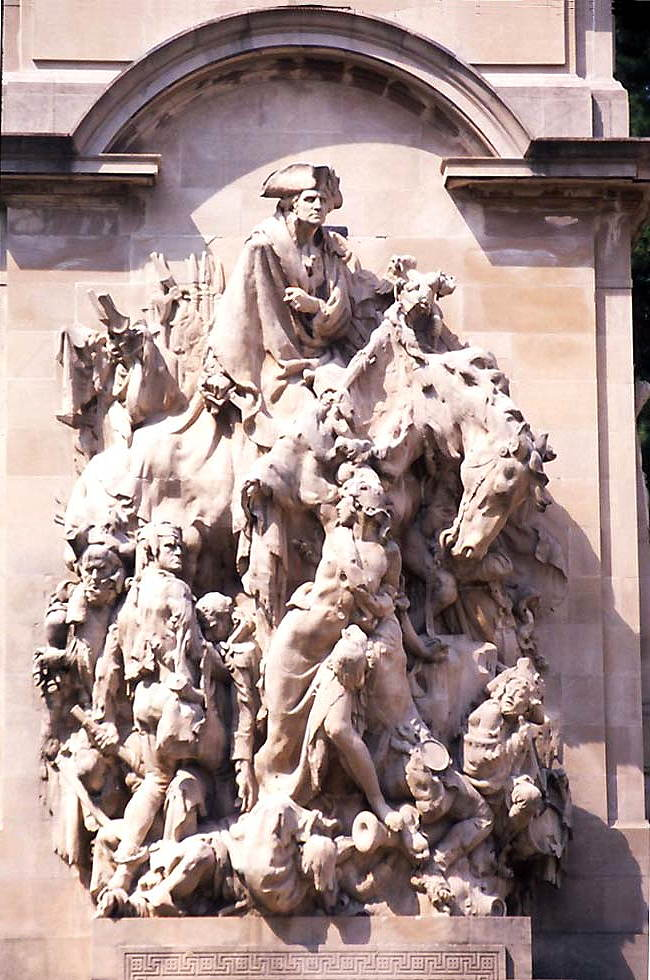
MacMonnies' Princeton Battle Monument

== Home grown ==
American sculpture of the mid- to late 19th century was often classical and often romantic, but it showed a special bent for a dramatic, narrative, almost journalistic realism (especially appropriate for nationalistic themes) as witnessed by the frontier life depicted by Frederic Remington. This was the beginning of the style of "Western Art" that continued with Alexander Phimister Proctor and others through the 20th into the 21st century.

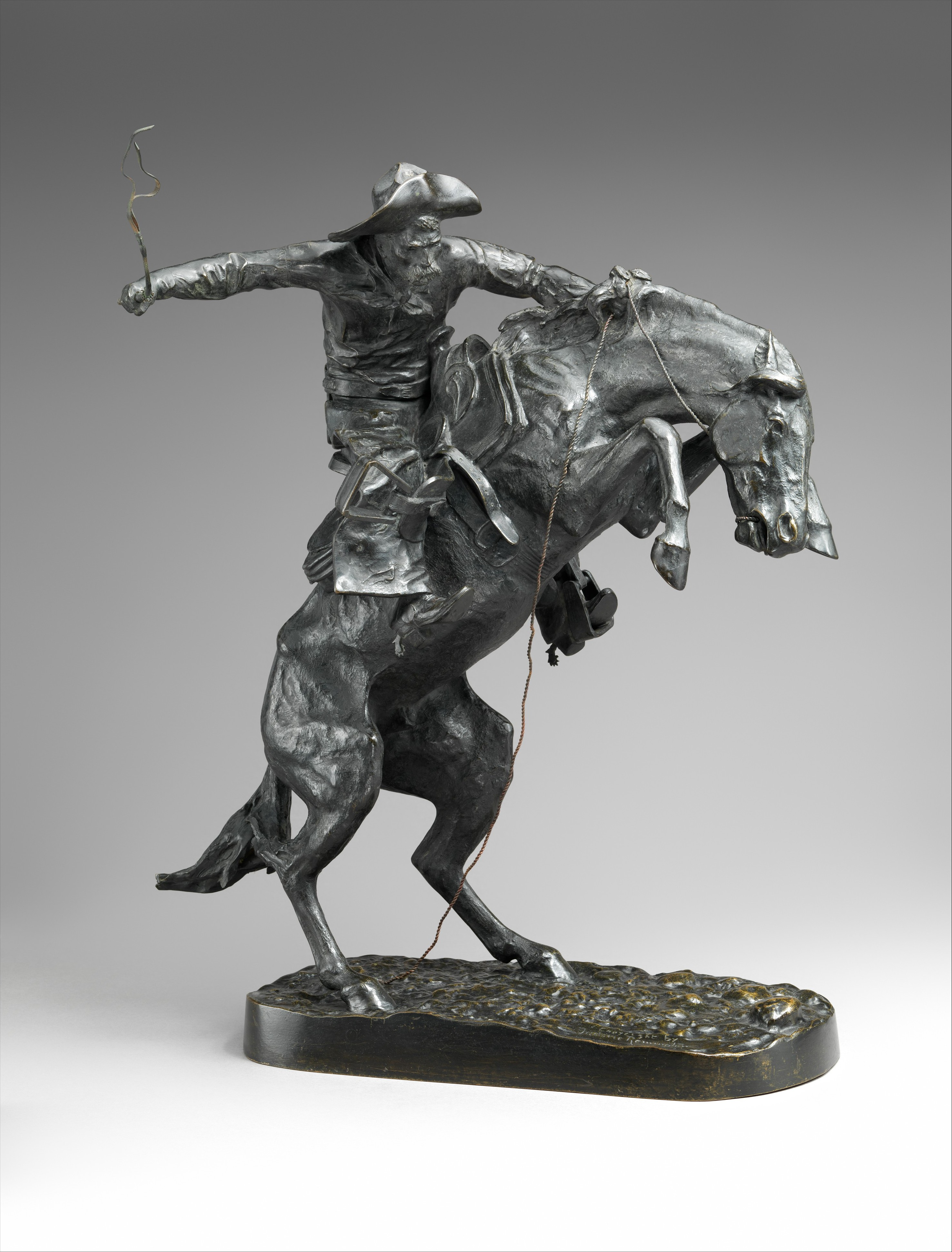
The Broncho Buster by Frederic Remington

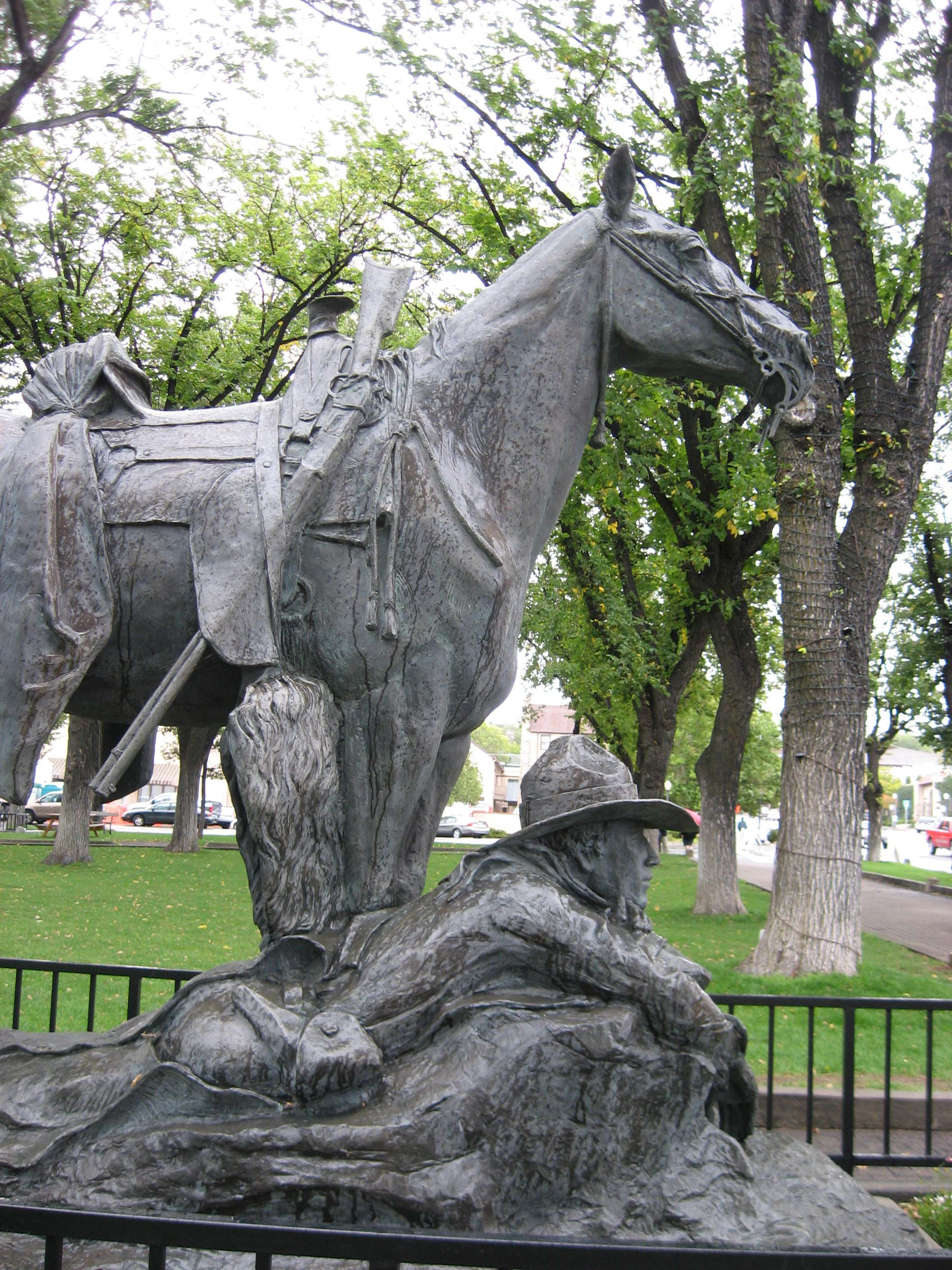
Cowboy at Rest by Solon Borglum, 1904

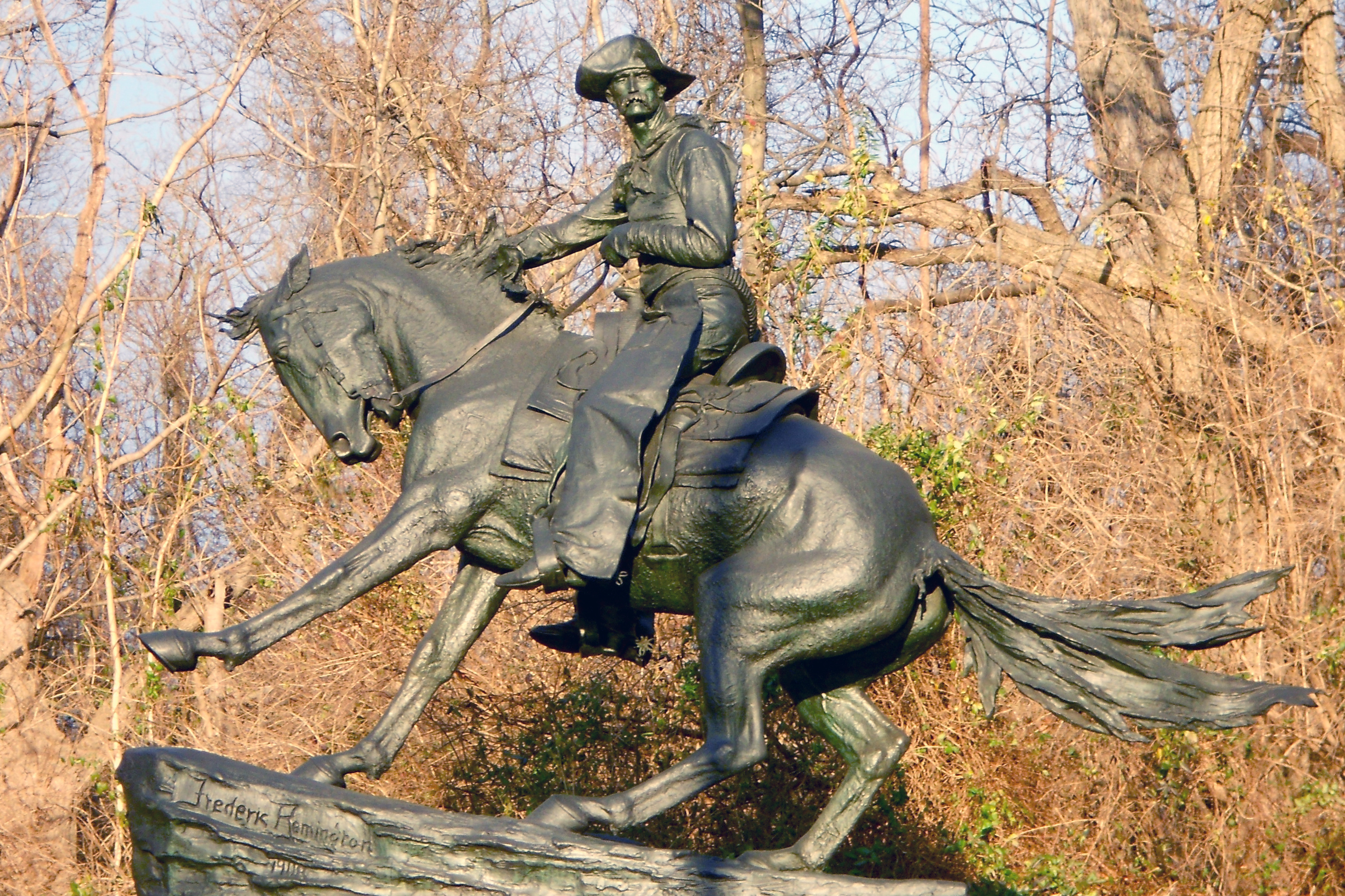
Cowboy by Frederic Remington, 1908

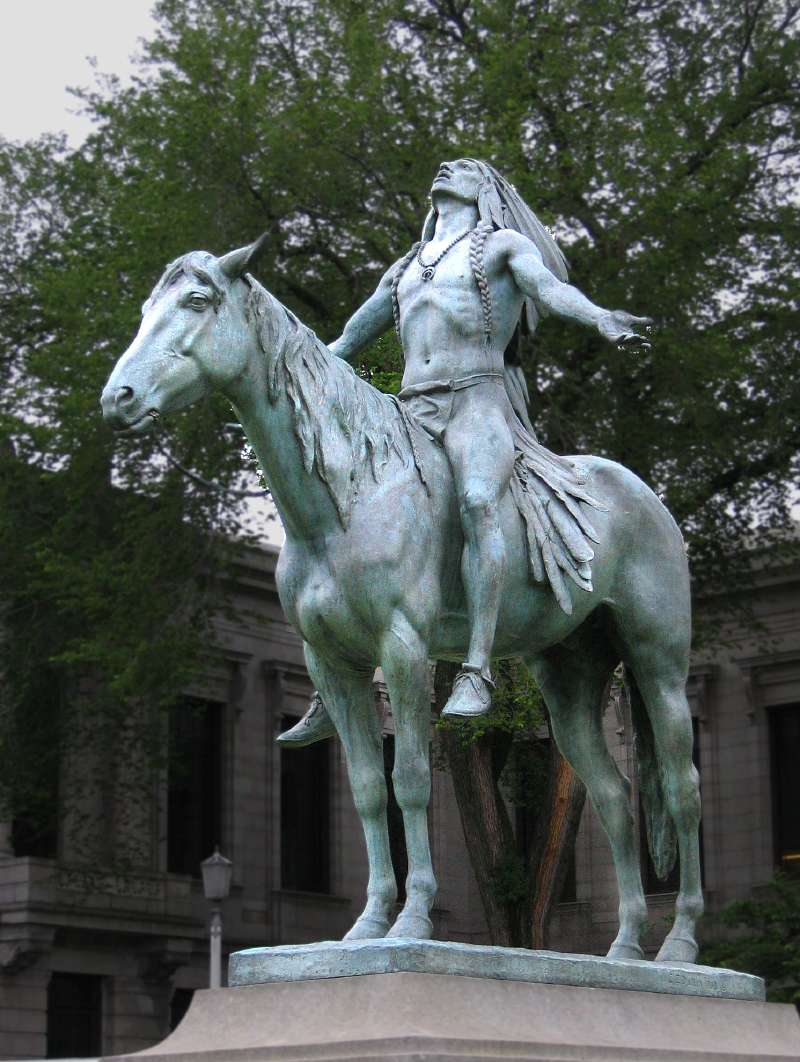
Appeal to the Great Spirit by Cyrus Dallin, 1909

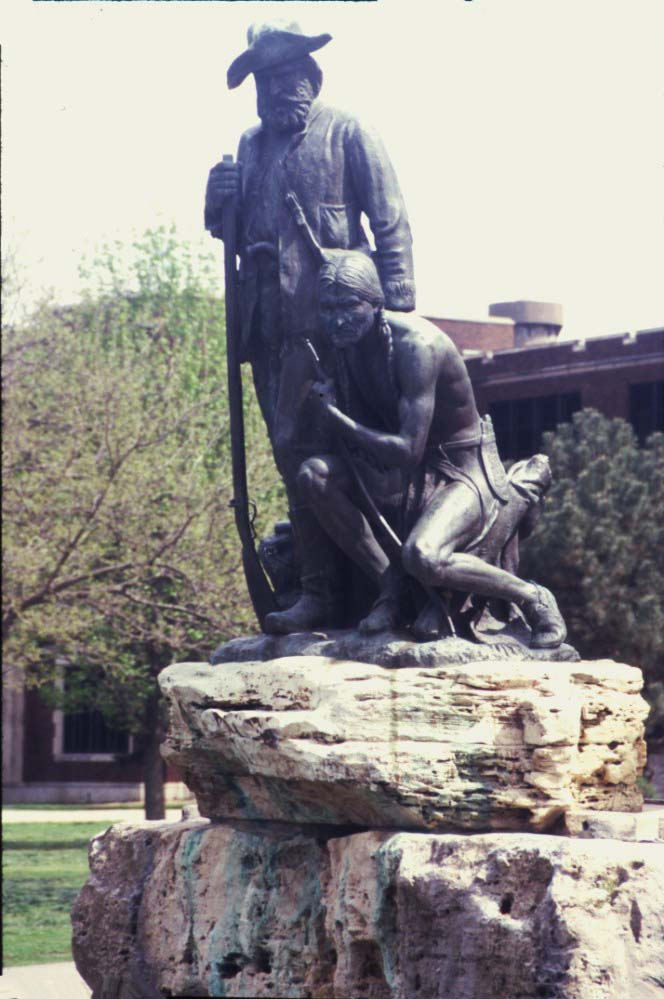
Hudson McKnight Memorial, by Alexander Phimister Proctor, 1931

== Animal sculptors (Animaliers) ==
The naturalism of the French school, exemplified by Antoine Barye, had a great impact on the first sculptors of American wildlife. The first generation of American animaliers included, Edward Kemeys, Edward Potter (who occasionally worked with Daniel Chester French, producing horses for his equestrian statues), Alexander Phimister Proctor (who executed mounts for Augustus Saint-Gaudens' riders), Charles Russell, Herbert Haseltine, Frederick Roth, Albert Laessle and Anna Hyatt Huntington.

Edward Kemeys (1833–1907), Locked in Death, 1886

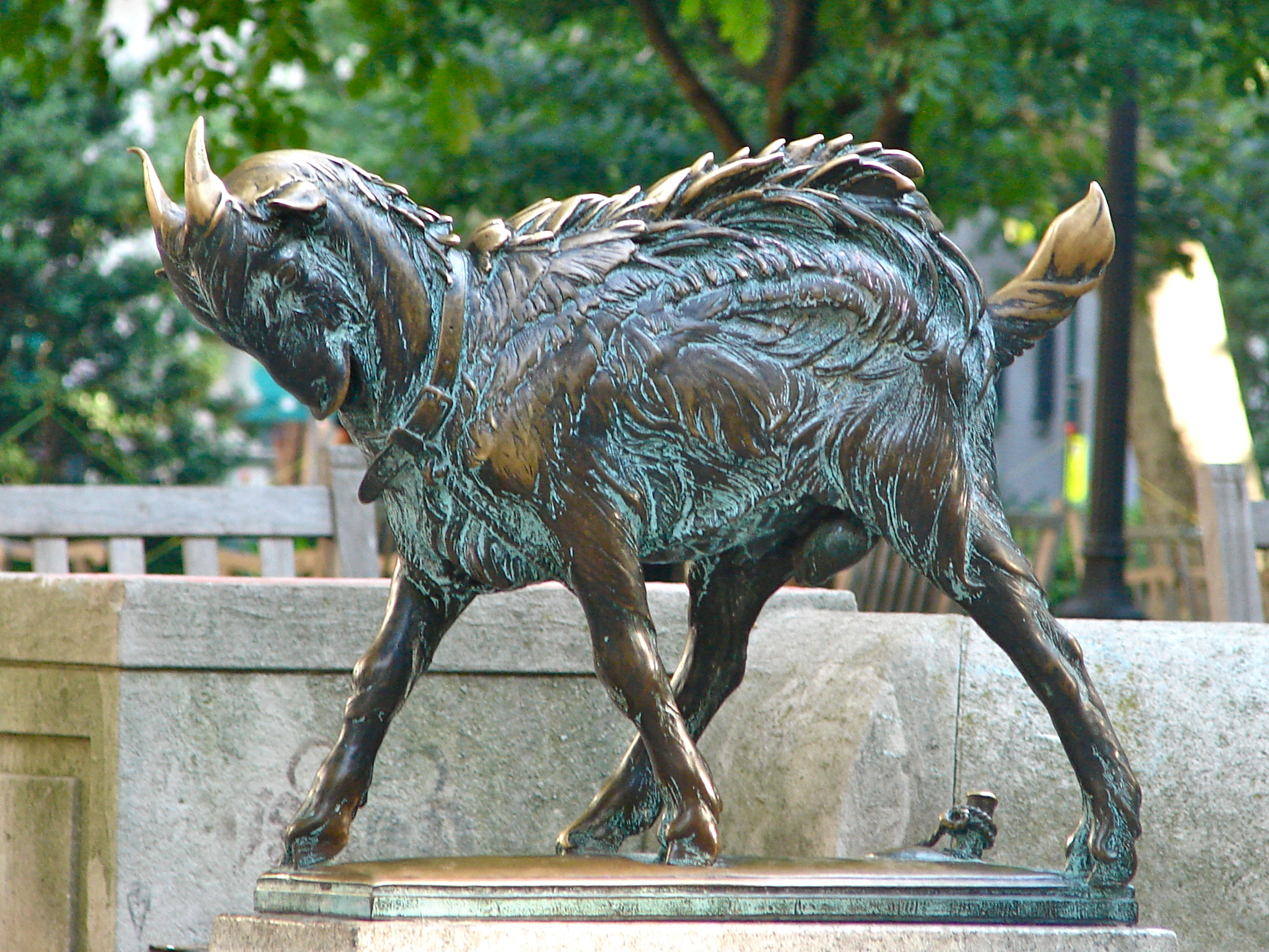
Albert Laessle (1877–1954), Billy, 1914

== Public monuments ==
The years following the American Civil War saw a huge increase in the number of public monuments erected in the United States. "By far the most prevalent monument features a fully equipped Confederate soldier (the same prototype held true for Union monuments) in a realistic pose." This style of monument was popularized by sculptor Martin Milmore who created one of the first ones in 1868. Milmore's own monument, authored by Daniel Chester French, Death and the Sculptor remains one of America's "noble tributes."

As the century closed, the pace of monument-building quickened in the great cities of the East, especially those erected to memorialize the Civil War. Several outstanding sculptors emerged, most of them trained in the beaux-arts academies of Paris. Daniel Chester French stands out, as do Frederick William Macmonnies, Hans Schuler, and Lorado Taft. This tradition continued to the 1940s with Charles Keck, Alexander Stirling Calder and others and the use of figurative sculpture in monuments persists into the 21st Century. After the middle of the 20th Century sculpture used in public monuments was increasingly abstract.

The decades following the Second World War saw a large number of monuments and memorials dedicated to the victims of the Holocaust.

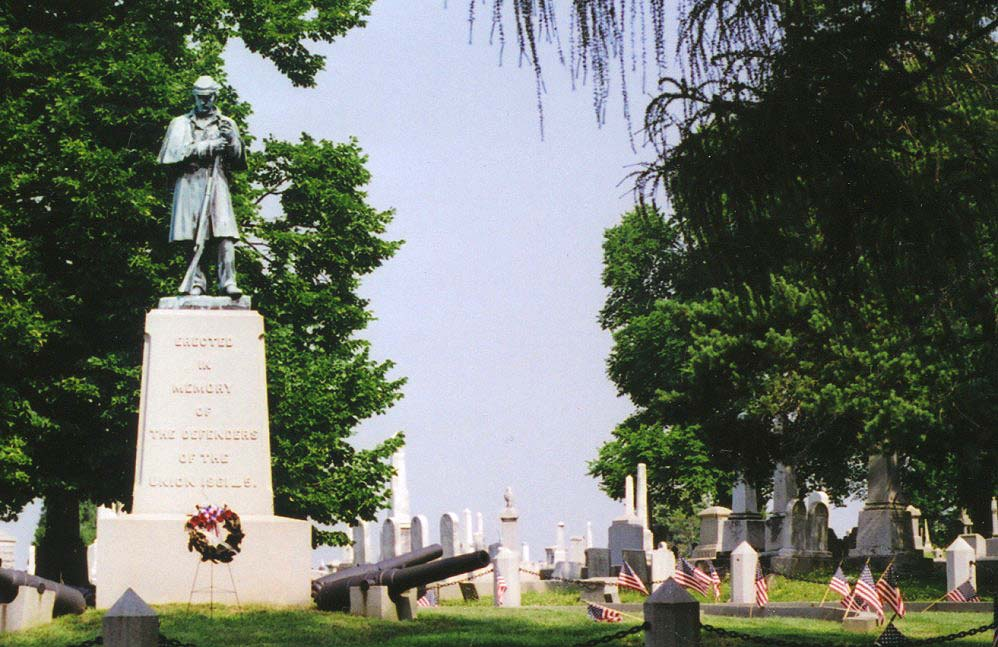
Civil War monument, by Martin Milmore in York, Pennsylvania, 1872

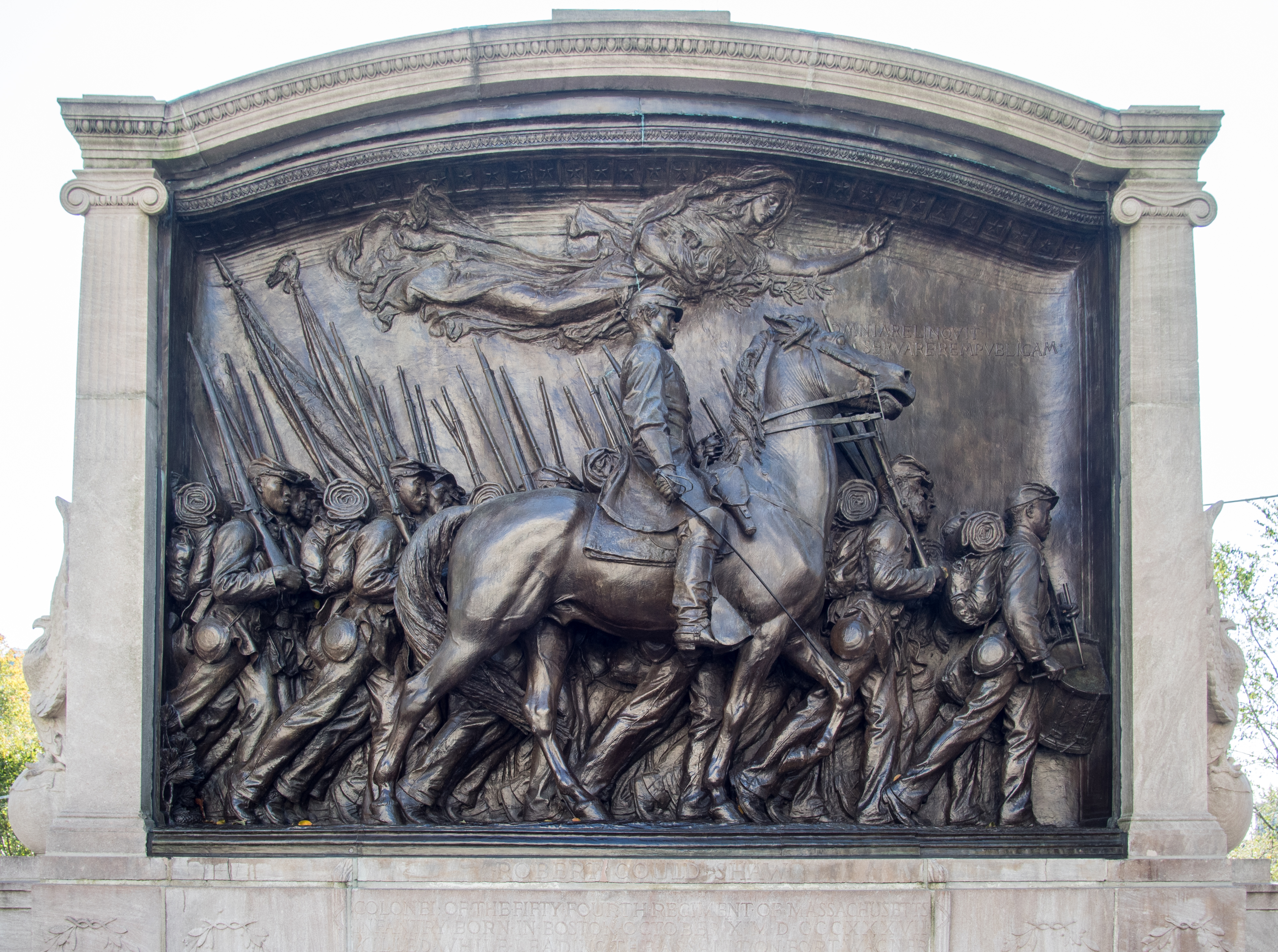
The Robert Gould Shaw Memorial, Boston Common, commemorates Shaw and the Afro-American 54th Massachusetts Volunteer Infantry, St. Gaudens

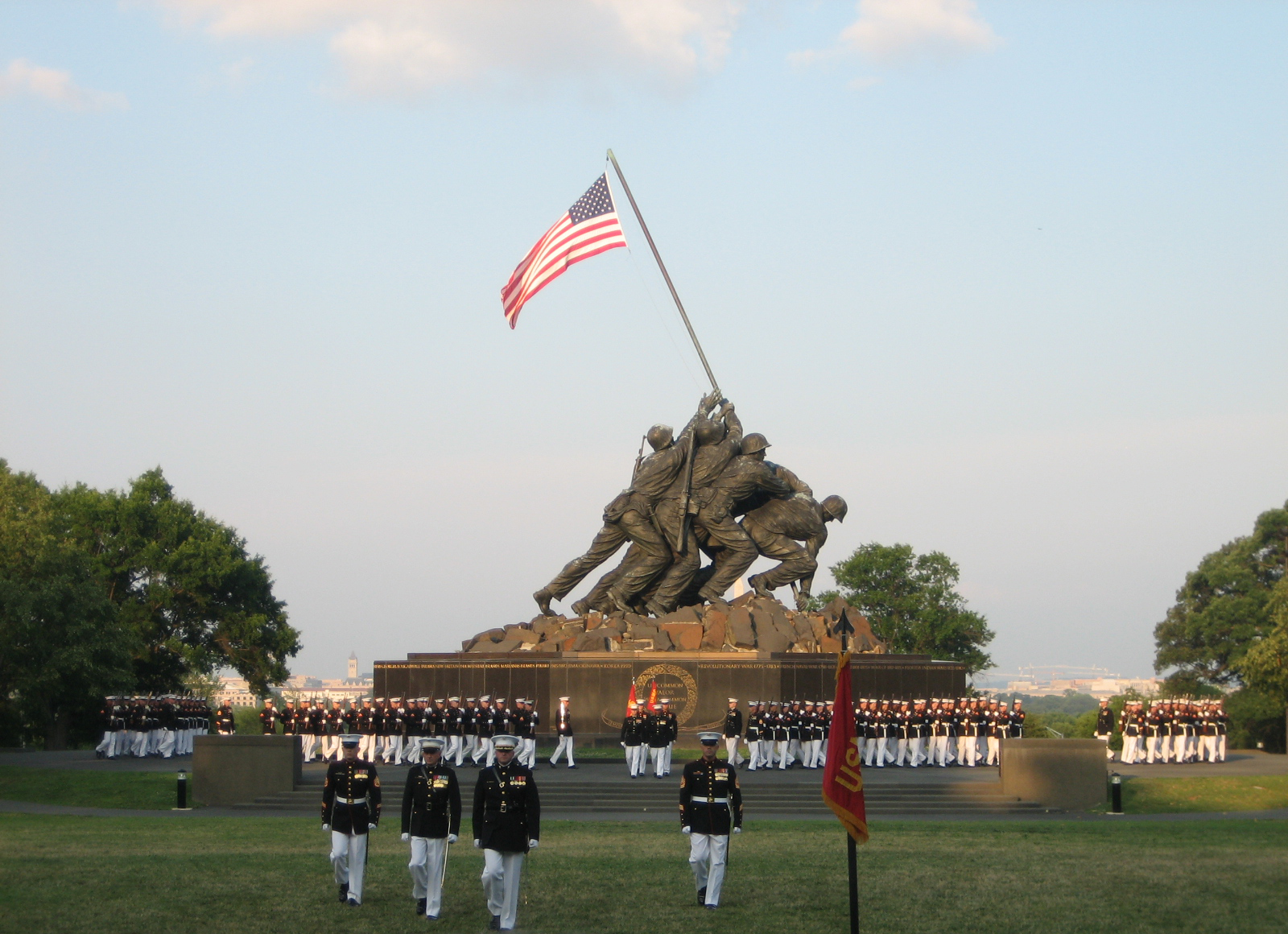
U.S. Marine Corps War Memorial, located in Arlington, Virginia, 1954, designed by Felix de Weldon

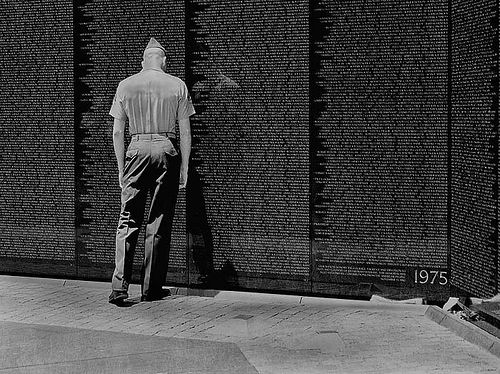
A Marine at Vietnam Veterans Memorial on July 4, 2002, designed by Maya Lin

=== Carving mountains ===
There are at least three major mountain sculptures in the United States. These are Mount Rushmore, Stone Mountain, and Crazy Horse Memorial. Gutzon Borglum, an accomplished sculptor with such pieces as Seated Lincoln and a variety of other public monuments, oversaw the sculpture of Mount Rushmore in the Black Hills in South Dakota. The monument was finished after his death by his son Lincoln Borglum.

Gutzon Borglum also was responsible for starting the Stone Mountain project in Georgia but had a falling-out with its overseers. The monument was then taken up by Augustus Lukeman, who died during its carving in 1935. The memorial was finished by Walker Hancock and was considered complete in 1972.

The Crazy Horse Memorial in the Black Hills of South Dakota depicts the Oglala Lakota warrior Crazy Horse riding a horse and pointing into the distance. It was begun in 1948 by sculptor Korczak Ziolkowski and continued after his death by his wife, Ruth Ziolkowski, who took over the helm of the project, and several of their children. The face was dedicated in 1998.

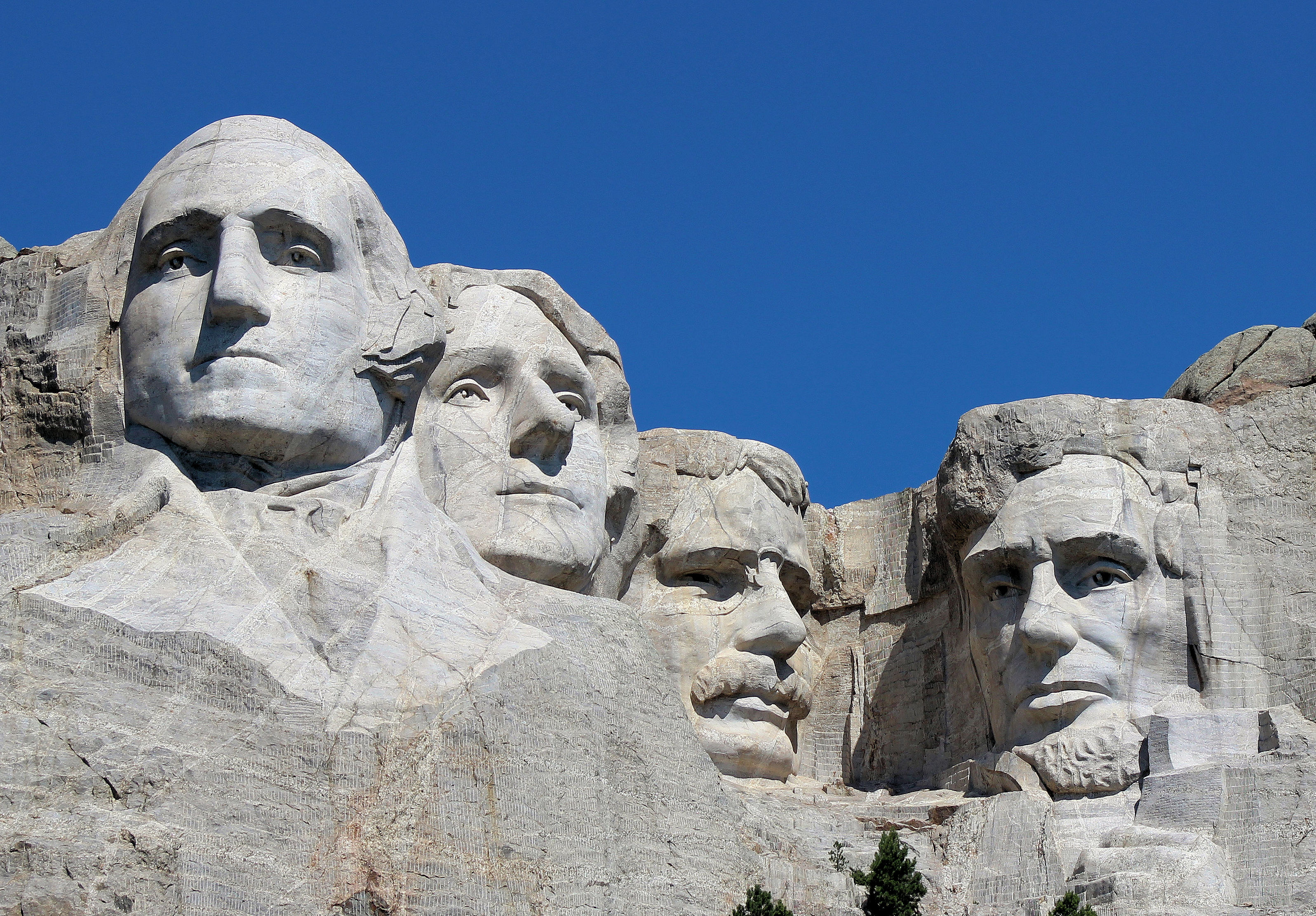
Mount Rushmore National Monument. Sculptures of George Washington, Thomas Jefferson, Theodore Roosevelt, and Abraham Lincoln represent the first 150 years of American history.

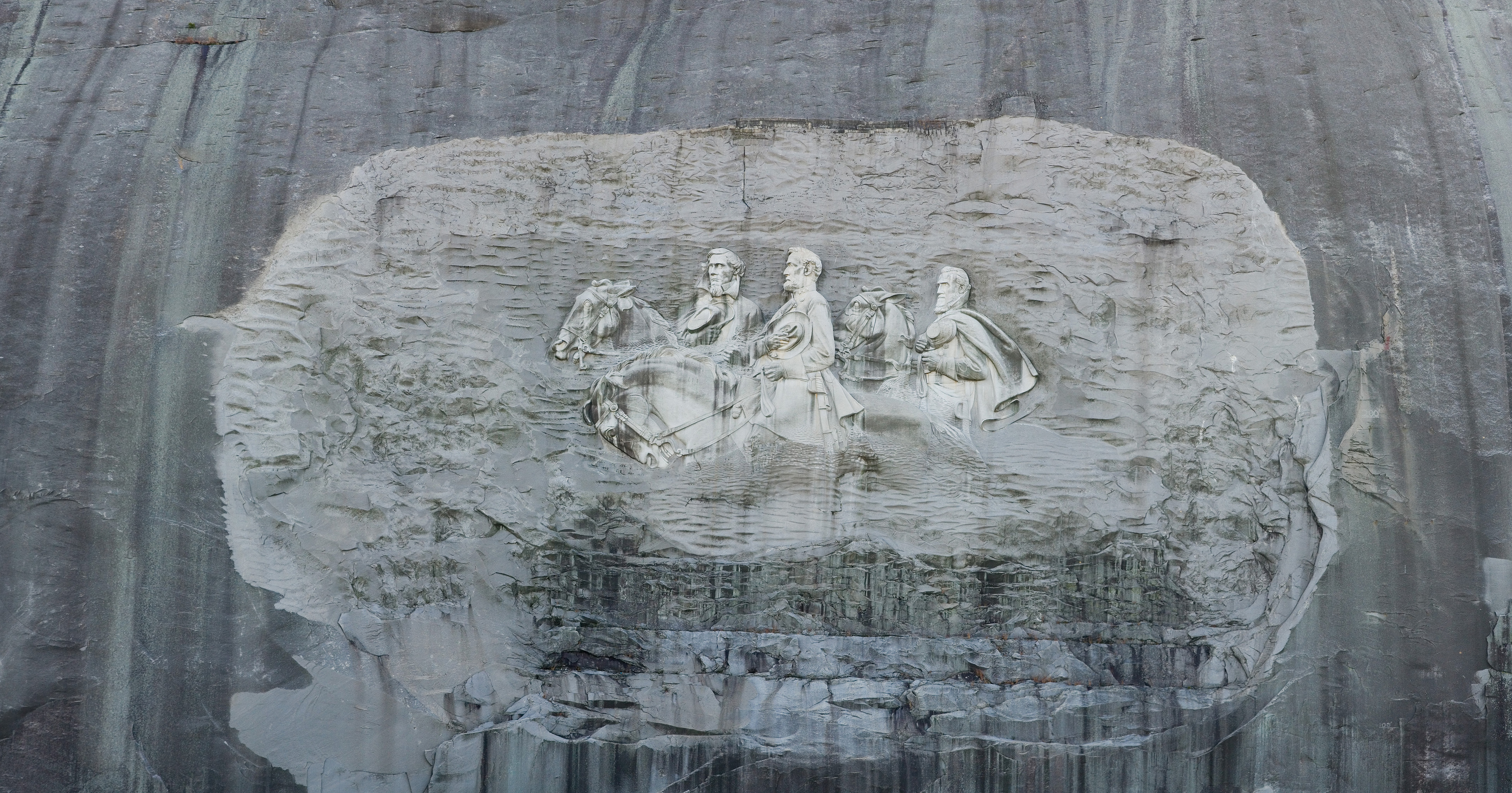
Stone Mountain in Georgia

=== Architectural sculpture ===
Public buildings of the last quarter of the 19th century and the first half of the 20th century provided an architectural setting for sculpture, especially in relief. Karl Bitter, Lee Lawrie, Adolph Alexander Weinman, C. Paul Jennewein, Rene Paul Chambellan, Corrado Parducci, and many others worked in the simple, sometimes narrative style that fit these spaces. Much of this work was created by anonymous sculptors and carvers.

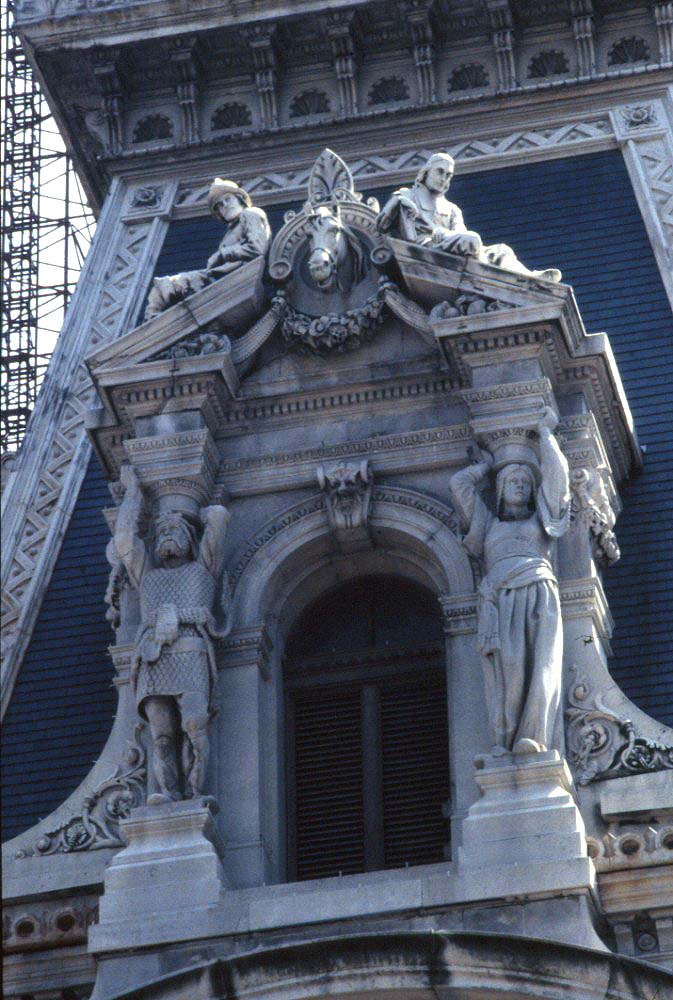
North America, Philadelphia City Hall, Alexander Milne Calder, sculptor, 1870s

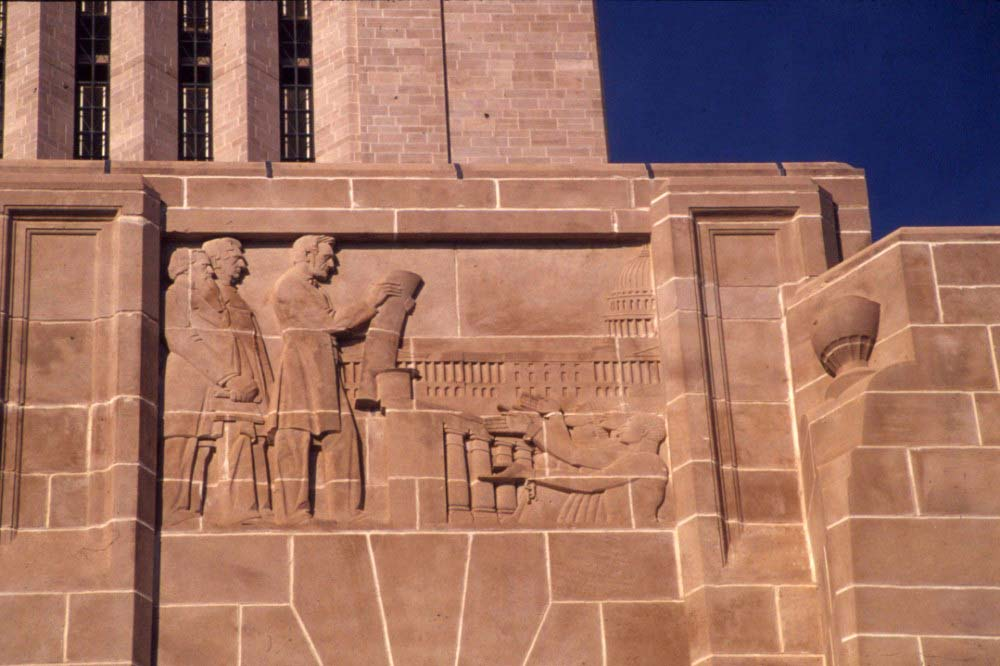
Lincoln issuing the Emancipation Proclamation, Nebraska State Capitol, Lee Lawrie, sculptor, c. 1925

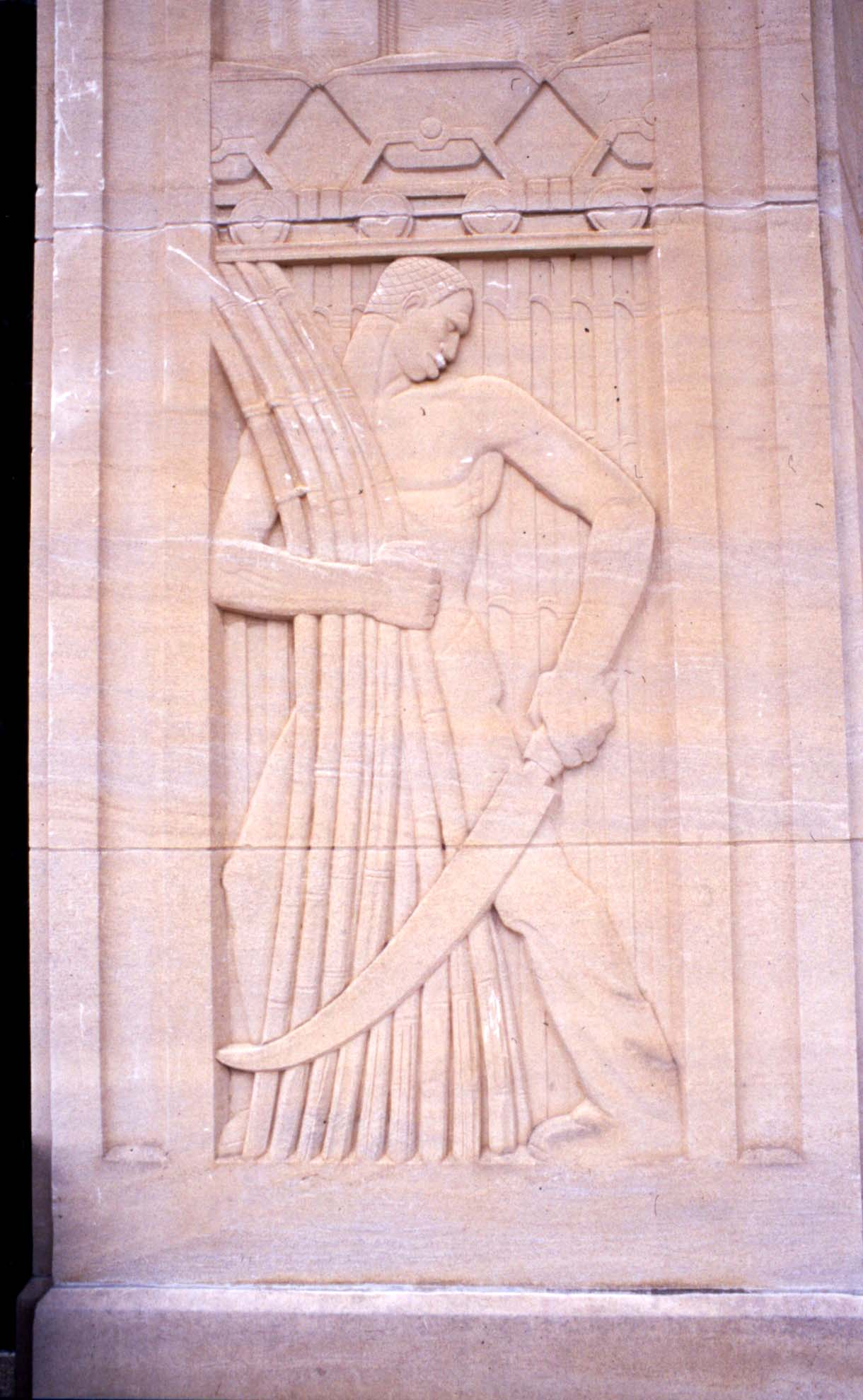
Cane Cutter, Louisiana State Capitol, Lee Lawrie, sculptor, 1929

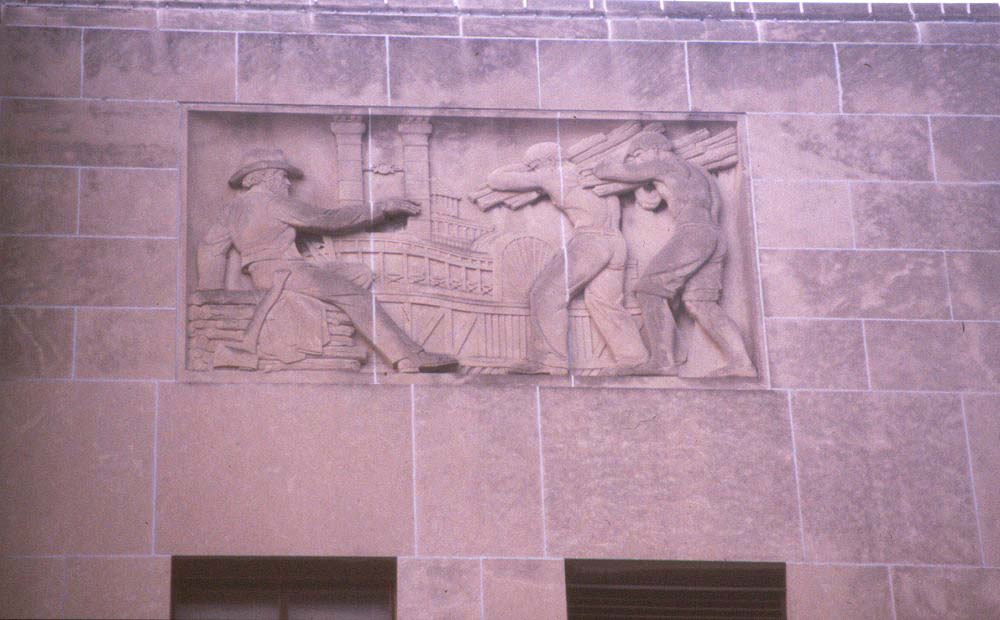
River Traffic, Kansas City City Hall, Walker Hancock, sculptor, 1937

== Twentieth century ==
As the century began, many young European sculptors migrated to the free, booming economy across the Atlantic, and European trained sculptors account for much of the great work created before 1950. These include Elie Nadelman, Albin Polasek, Gaston Lachaise and Carl Milles.

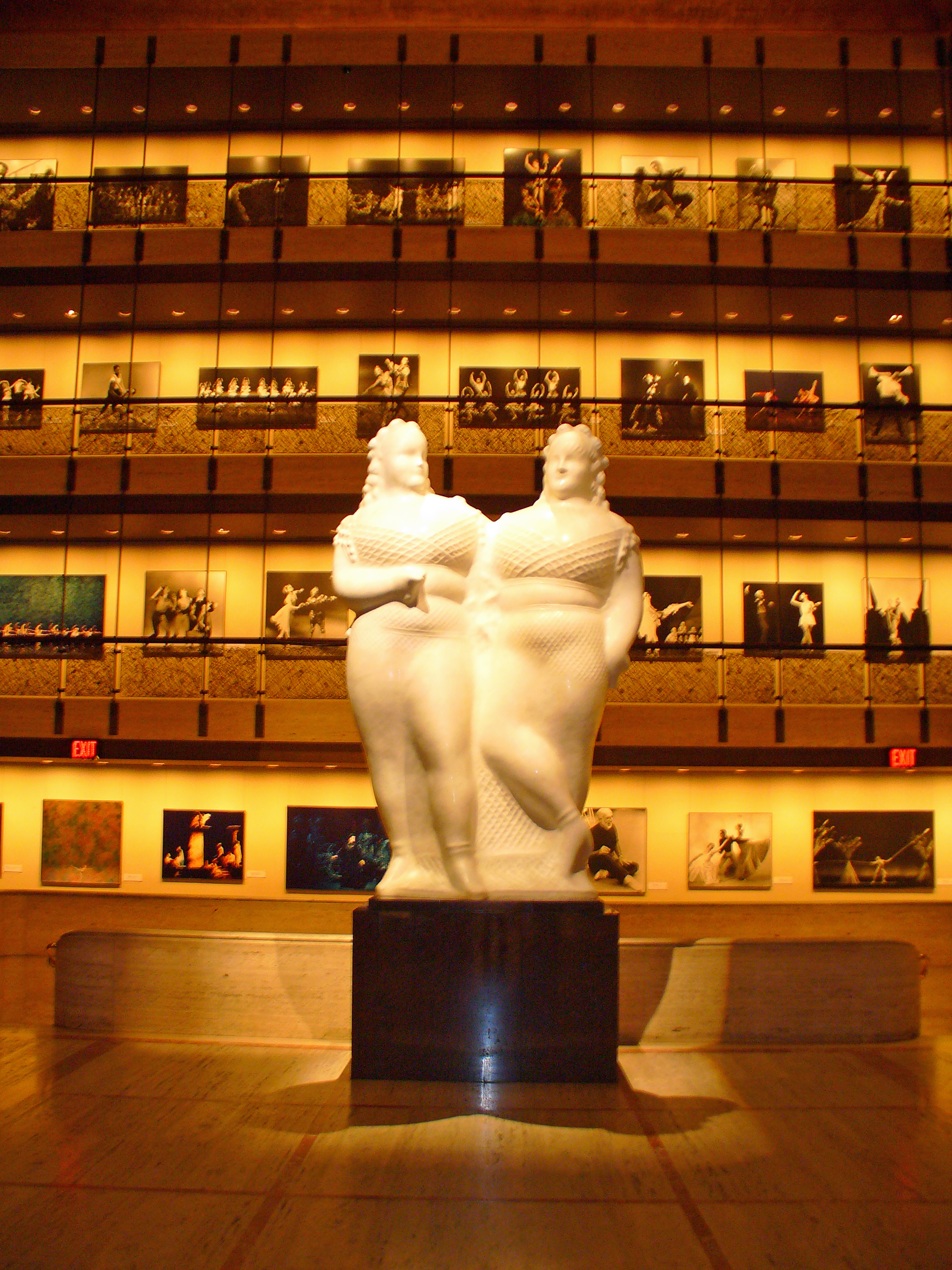
Elie Nadelman sculpture in the New York State Theater

=== Modern Classicism ===
Several notable American sculptors joined in the revitalization of the classical tradition at this time, most notably Paul Manship, who "discovered" archaic Greek sculpture while studying on a scholarship in Rome. C. Paul Jennewein and Edward McCartan were also leaders in this direction who fit easily with the art-deco tastes of the 1920s. In the 1930s and 1940s, the ideologies that rent European politics were reflected in associations of American sculptors. On the right was the group, mostly native-born, mostly old-school classical, mostly modelers of clay, who founded the National Sculpture Society, led by the heiress and sculptor Anna Hyatt Huntington and preserved in the sculpture park that she endowed — Brookgreen Gardens in South Carolina.

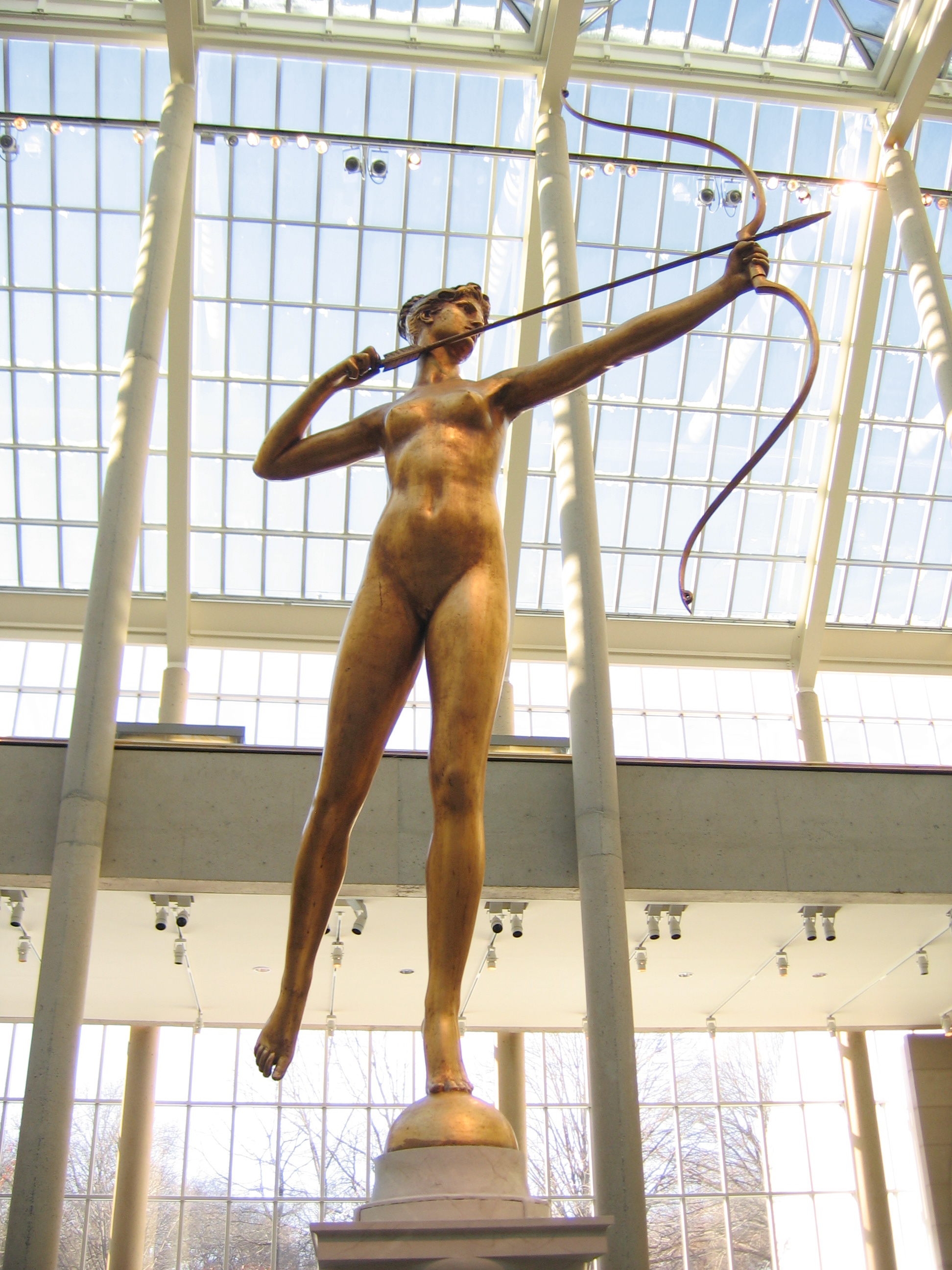
Augustus Saint-Gaudens, Diana (1892–93)

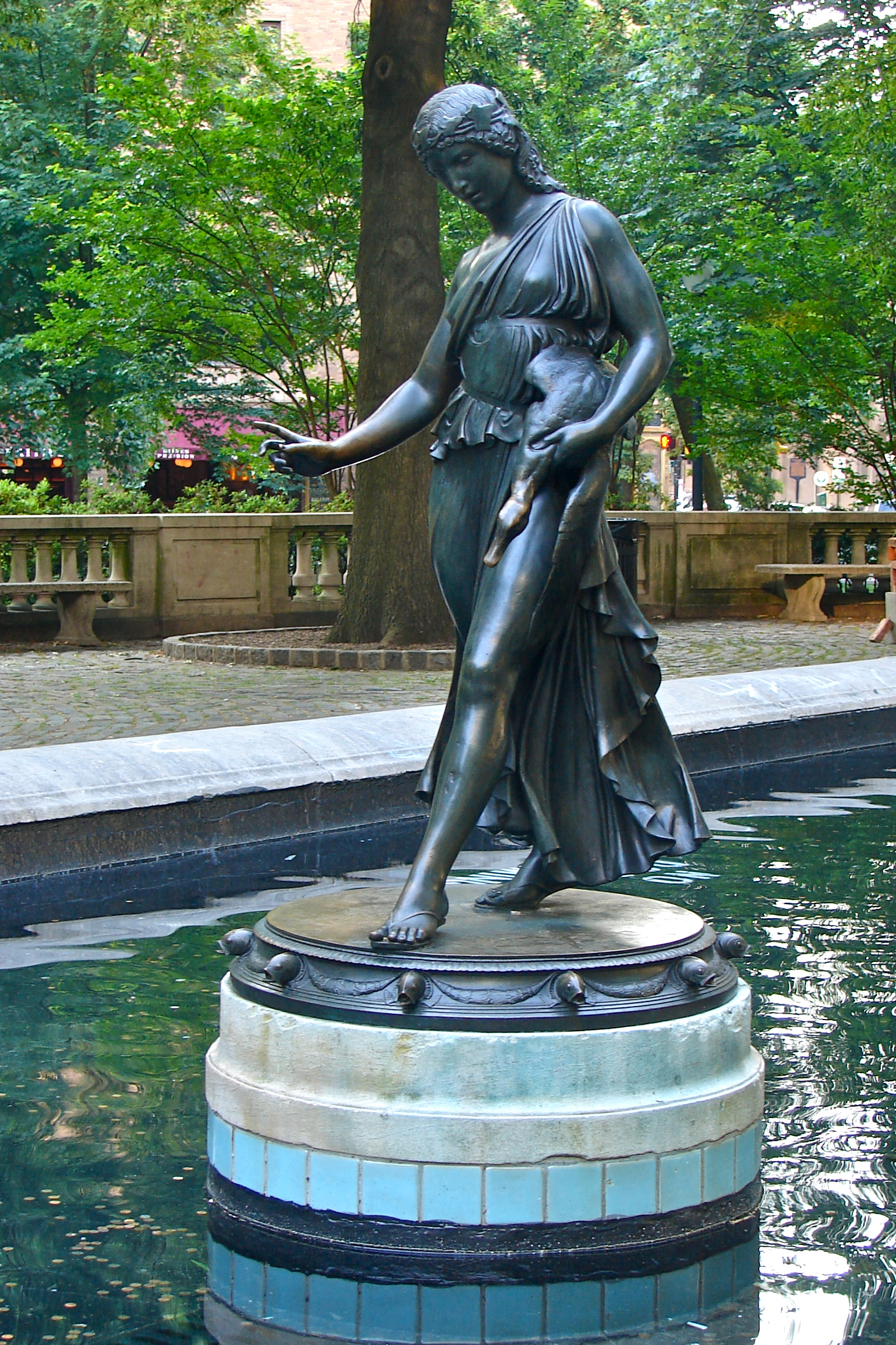
Paul Manship, Duck Girl, 1916

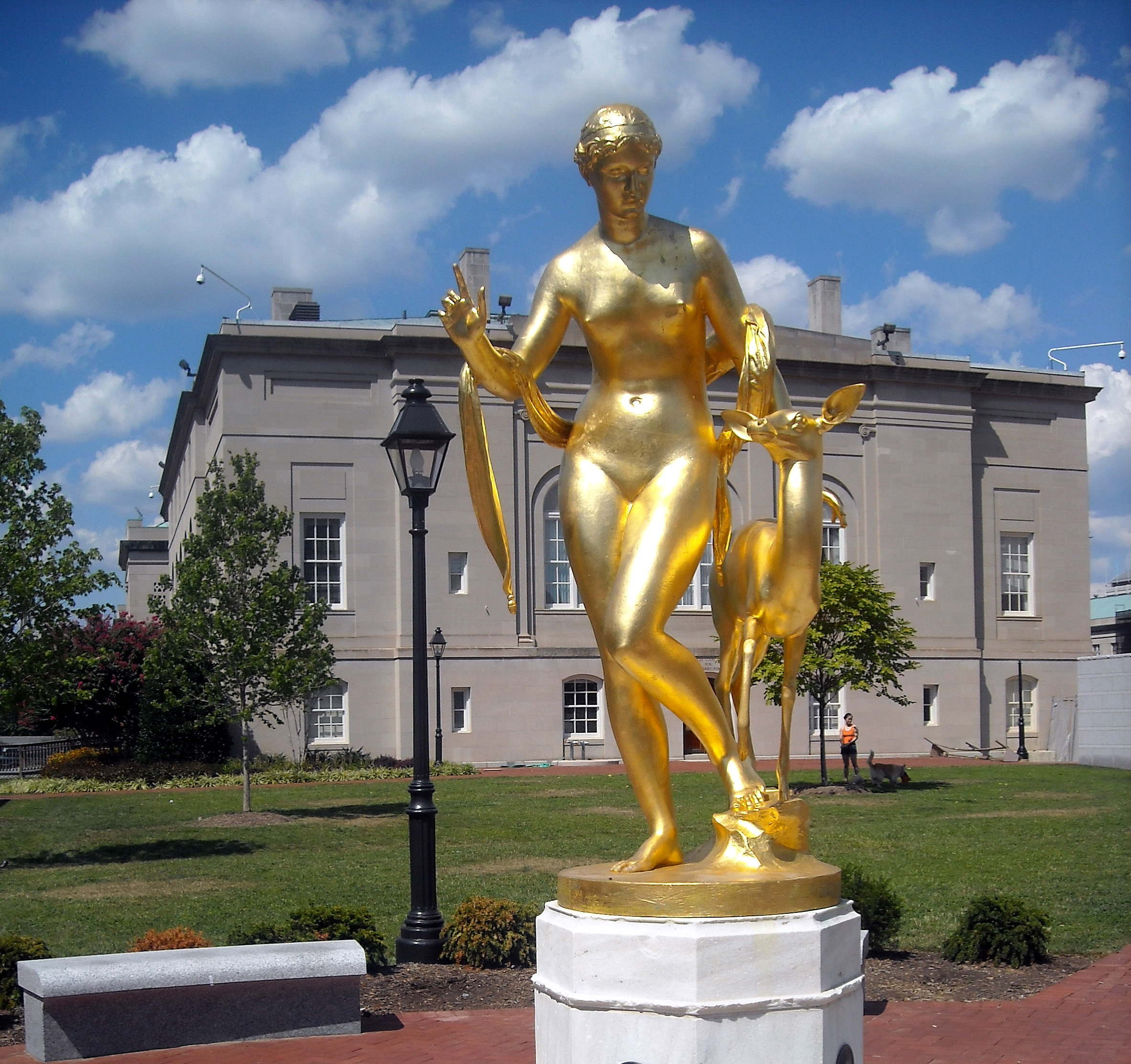
C. Paul Jennewein, Darlington Memorial Fountain, 1922

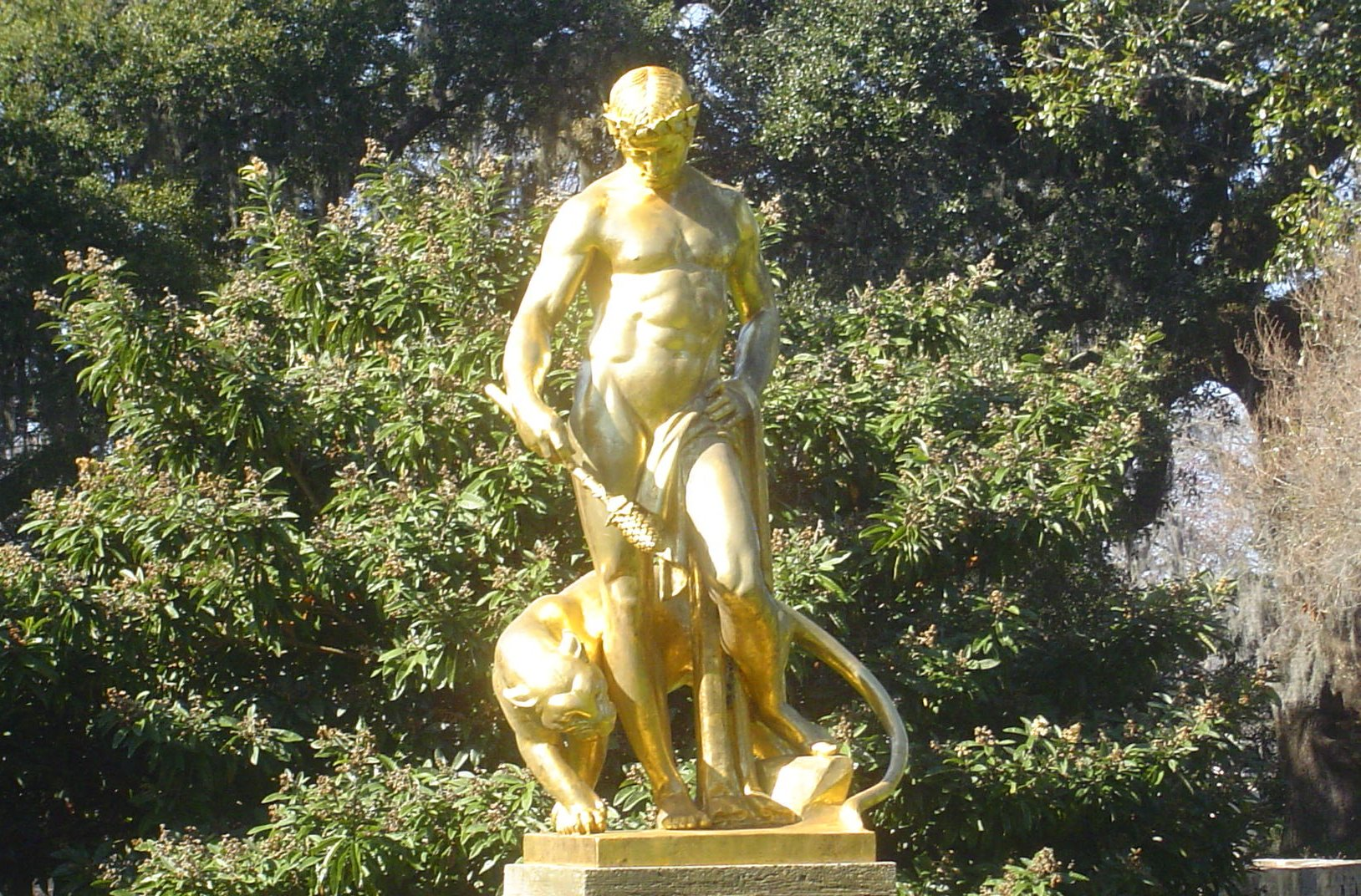
Edward McCartan, Dionysus, 1923

=== American Expressionism ===
On the left, often immigrant, often expressionistic, was the New York-based Sculptors Guild, with an emphasis on more current themes and direct carving in wood or stone. One of its better known members was William Zorach.

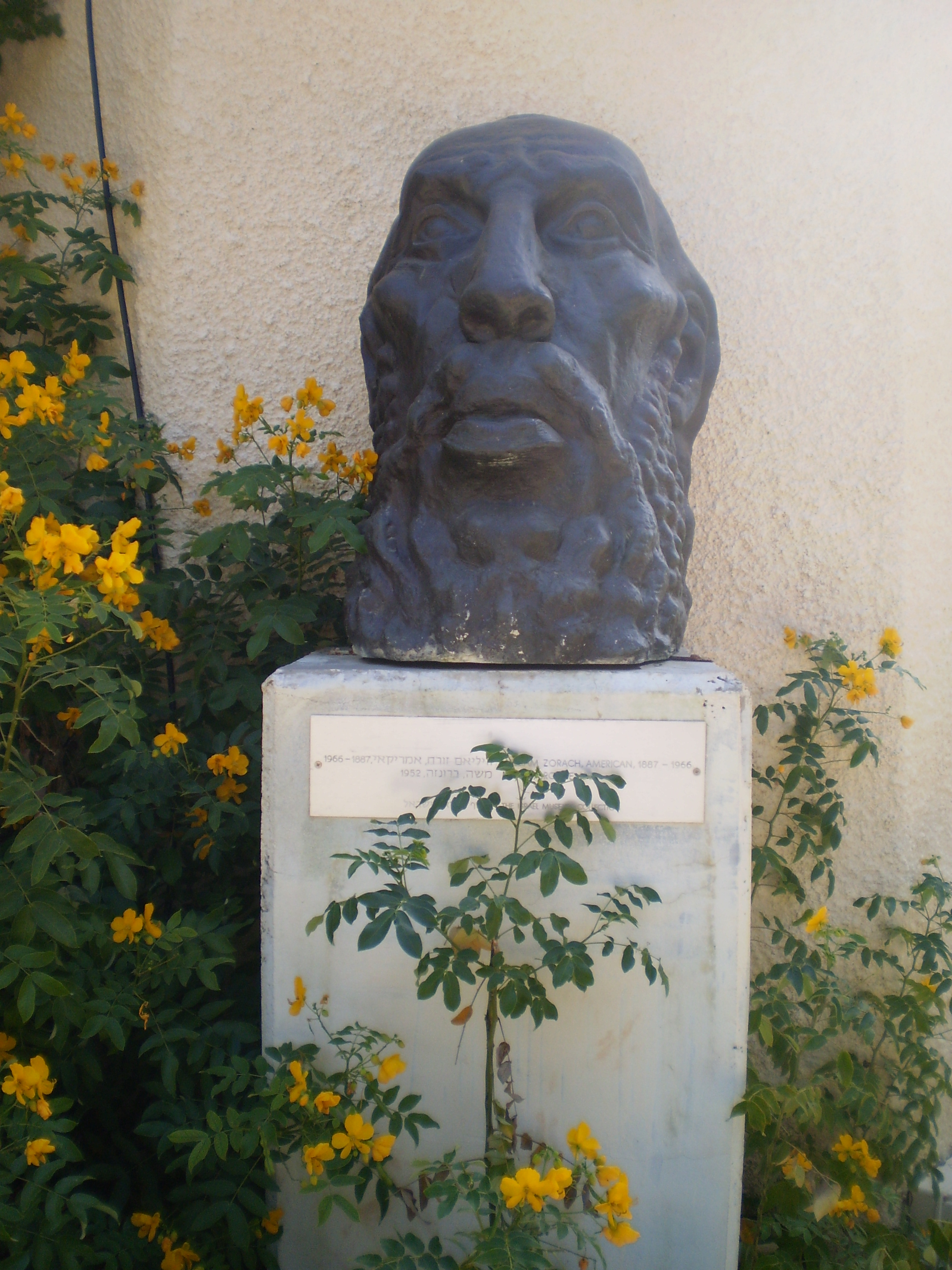
Moses, William Zorach, 1952

=== African-American sculptors ===
With the Harlem Renaissance, an African-American sculpture genre emerged. Richmond Barthé was an outstanding example. Augusta Savage was a sculptor and teacher. Richard Hunt was the first to have a retrospective show at the Museum of Modern Art in 1971. Other contemporary sculptors include Elizabeth Catlett, Martin Puryear, Jerry Harris, and Thaddeus Mosley.

=== Turn toward abstraction ===
Some Americans, such as Isamu Noguchi, had already moved from figurative to nonfigurative design, but after 1950, the entire American art world took a dramatic turn away from the former tradition, and America led the rest of the world into a more iconoclastic and theoretical approach to modernism.

Within the next ten years, traditional sculpture education would almost completely be replaced by a Bauhaus-influenced concern for abstract design. To accompany the triumph of abstract expressionist painting, heroes of abstract sculpture such as David Smith emerged, and many new materials were explored for sculptural expression. Louise Nevelson pioneered the emerging genre of environmental sculpture.

However, during this period a group of American sculptors persisted in creating works in their pre-war, modern/classical-style. These include Milton Horn, Donal Hord, Charles Umlauf, Joseph Erhardy, and John Henry Waddell.

=== Gallery of Modernist American sculpture ===
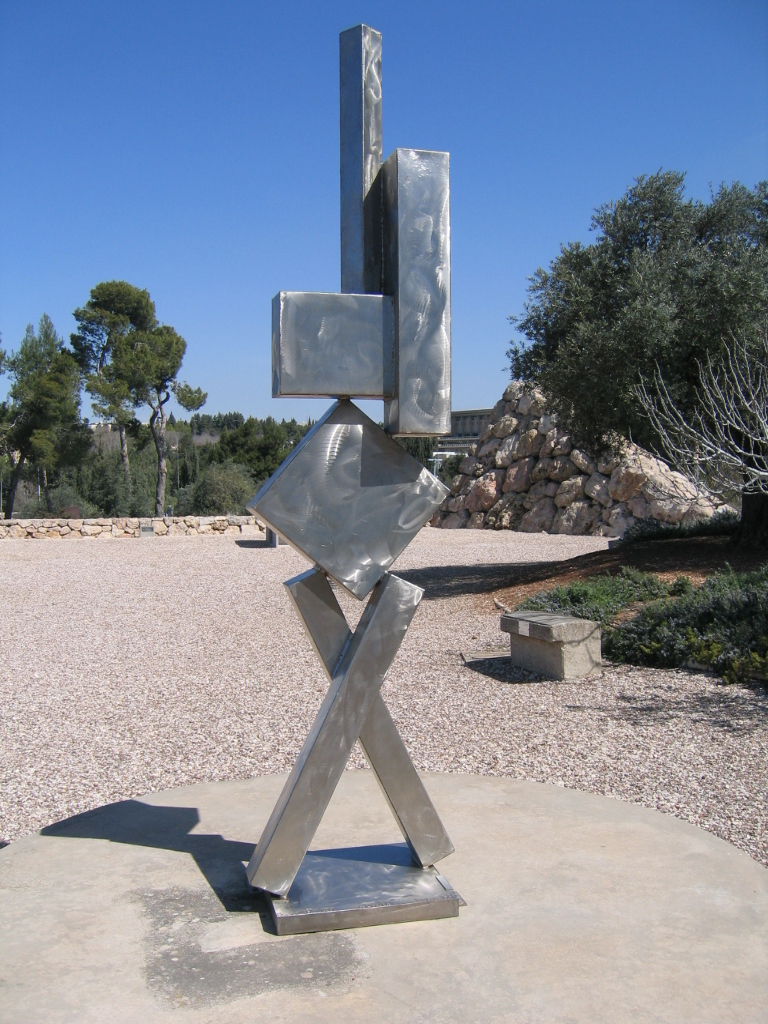
David Smith (1906–1965), CUBI VI, (1963, from Smith's Cubi series), Israel Museum, Jerusalem.

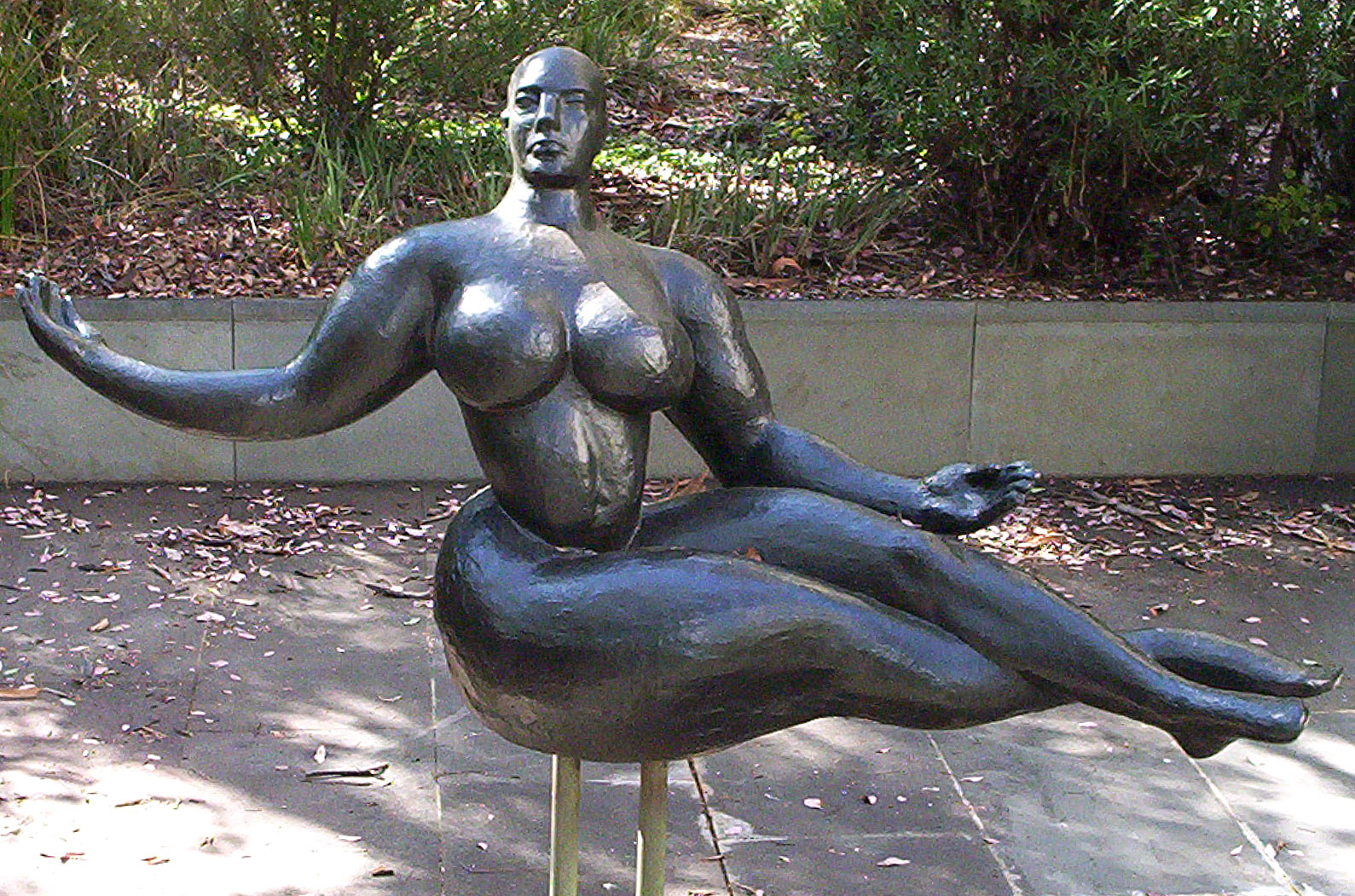
Gaston Lachaise (1882–1935), Floating Figure 1927, bronze, no. 5 from an edition of 7, National Gallery of Australia

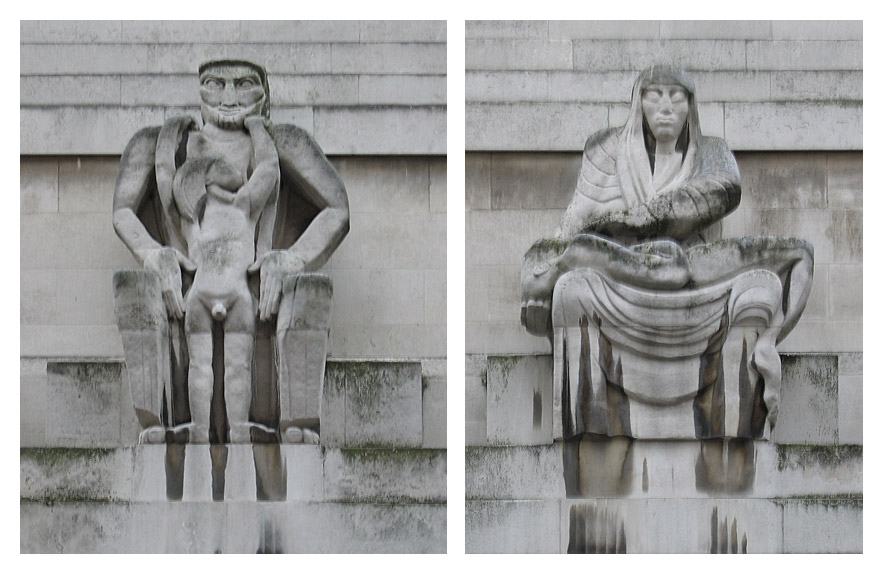
Jacob Epstein (1880–1959), Day and Night, carved for the London Underground's headquarters, 1928.

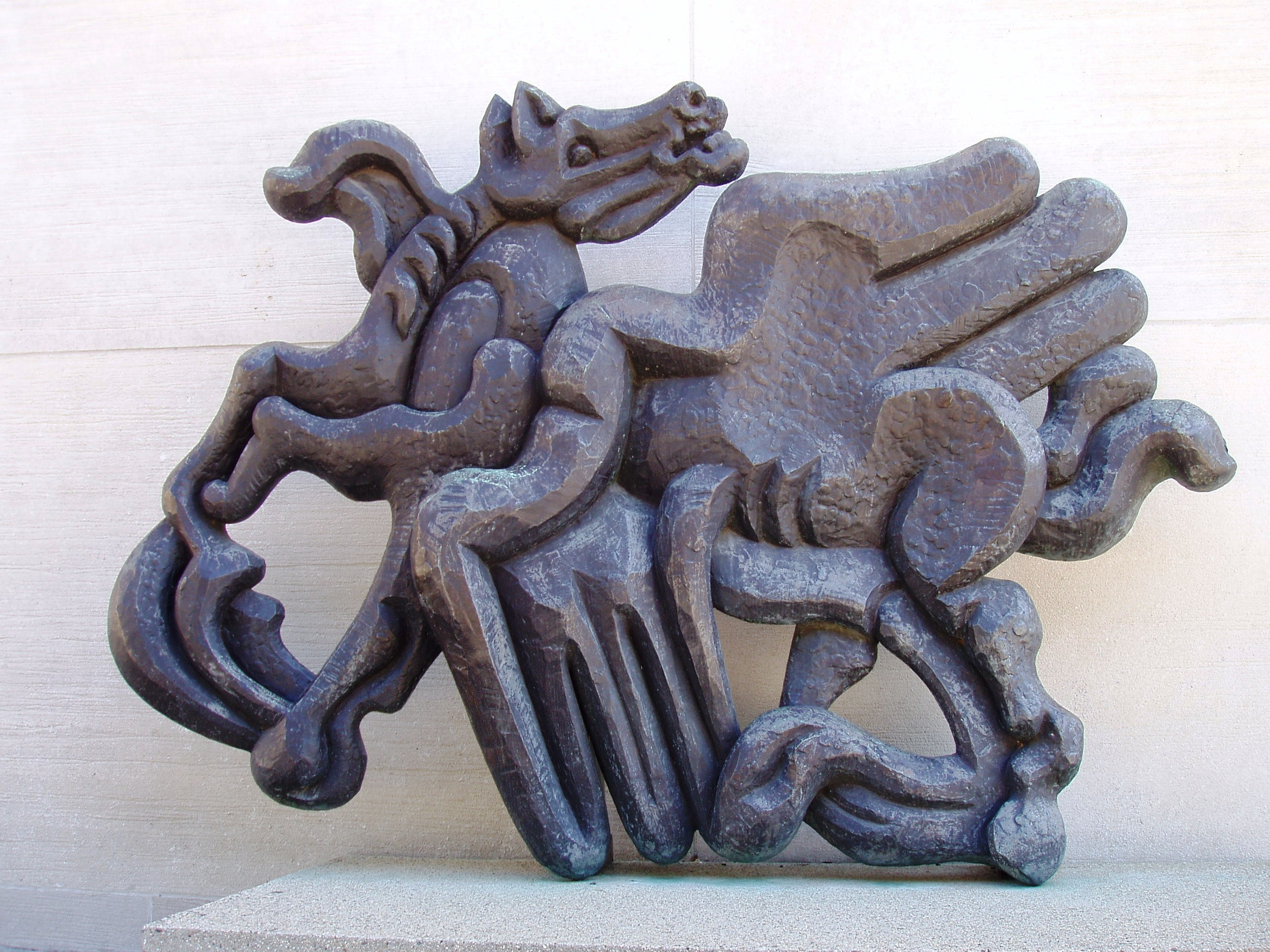
Jacques Lipchitz (1891–1973), Birth of the Muses, (1944–1950).

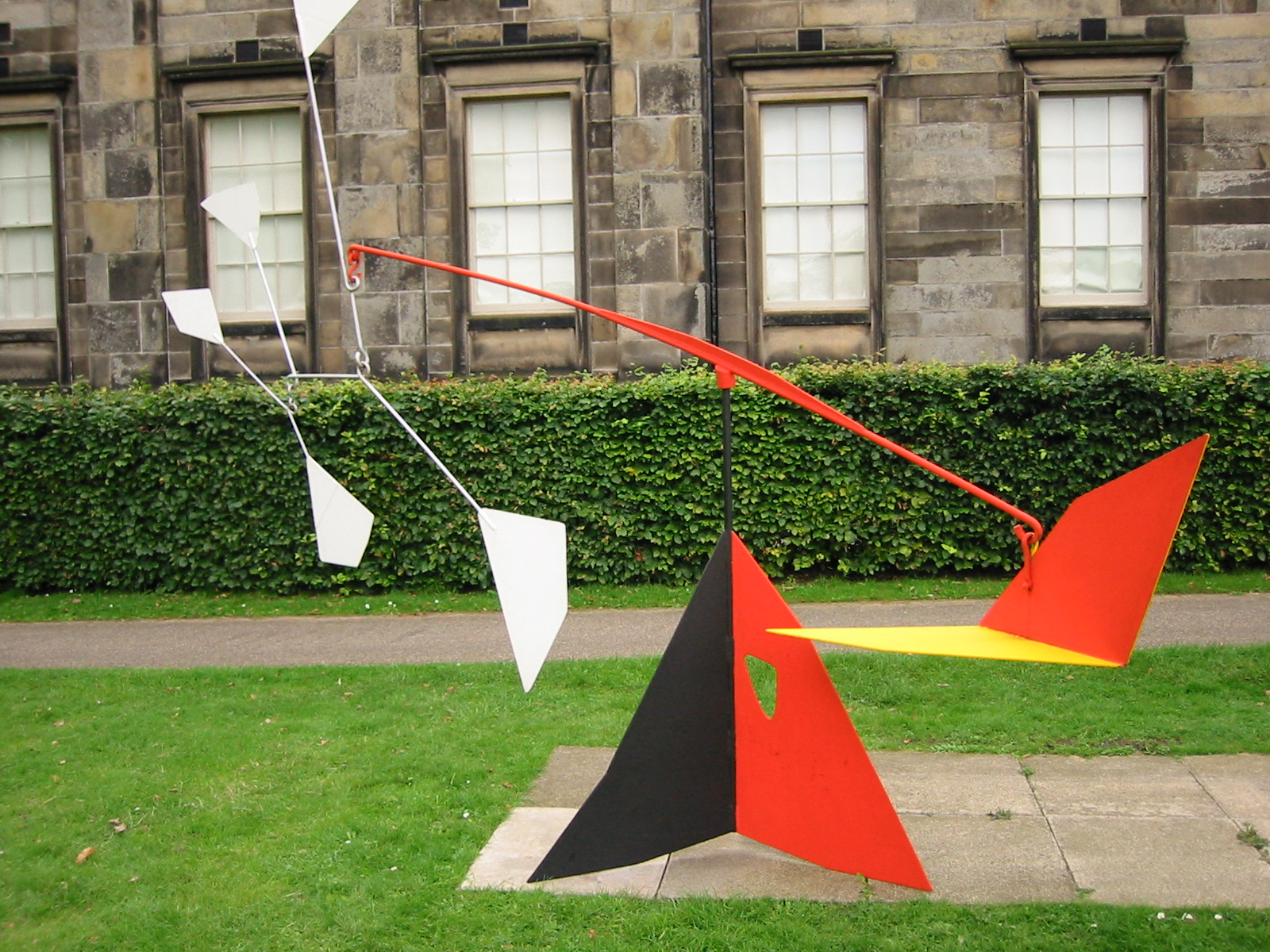
Alexander Calder (1898–1976), L'empennage (1953)

David Smith, (1906–1965)
Agricola I, 1952, Hirshhorn Museum and Sculpture Garden, Washington, DC.

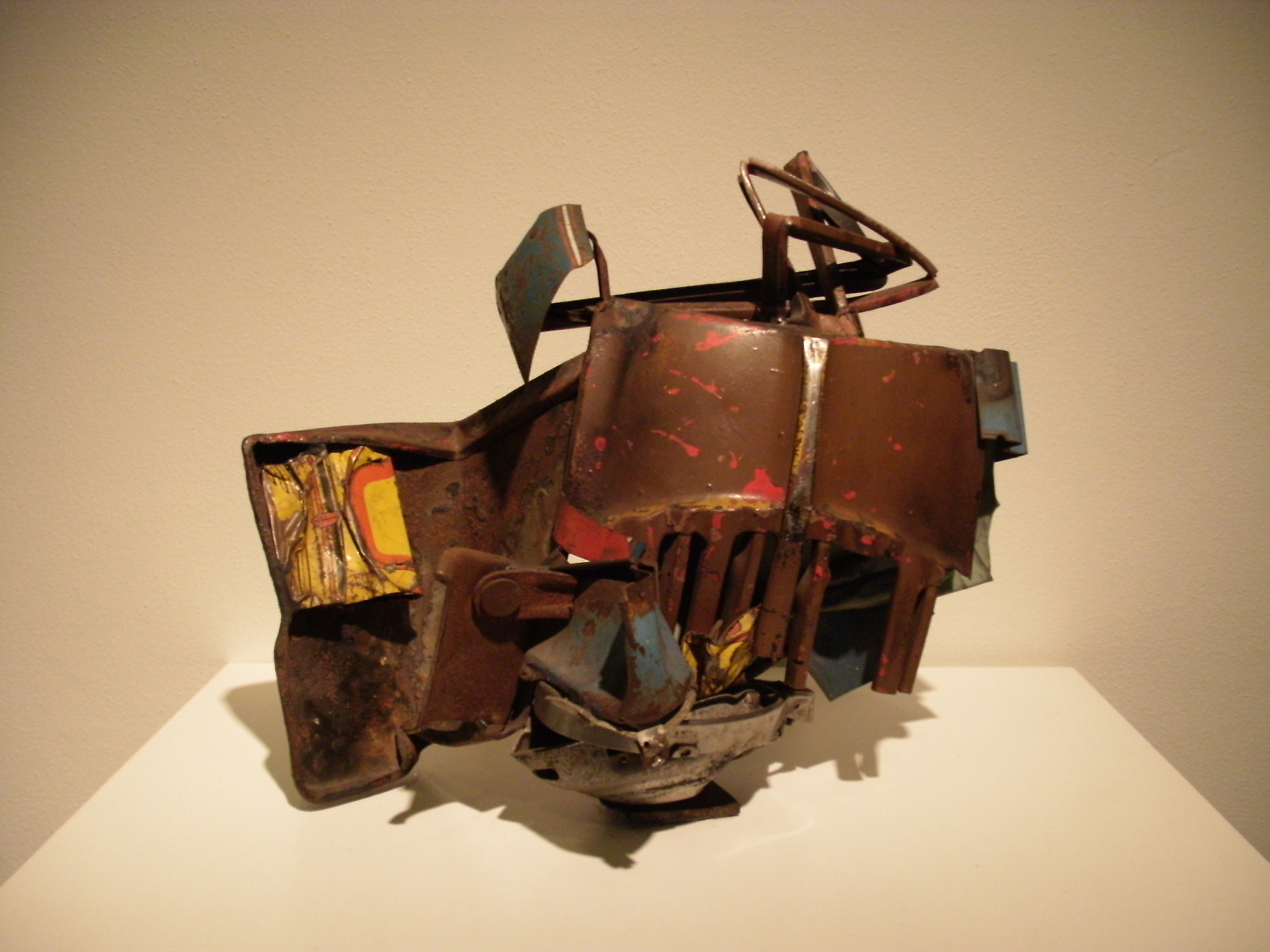
John Chamberlain (1927–2011), S, 1959, Hirshhorn Museum and Sculpture Garden, Washington, DC.

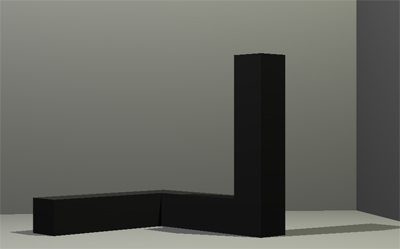
Tony Smith (1912–1980), Free Ride, 1962, 6'8 x 6'8 x 6'8 (the height of a standard US door opening), Museum of Modern Art, New York

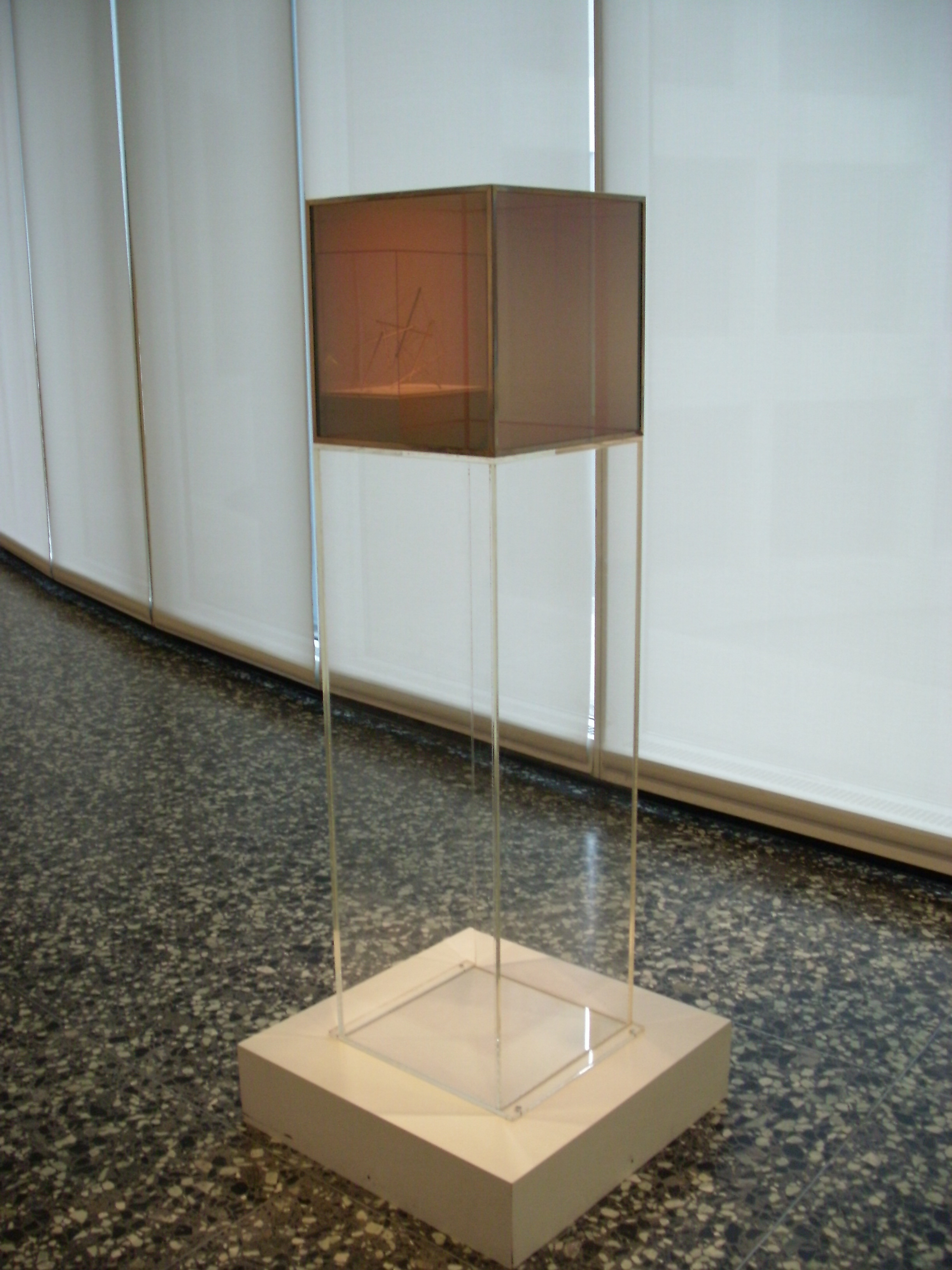
Larry Bell (born 1939), Untitled 1964, bismuth, chromium, gold, and rhodium on gold-plated brass; Hirshhorn Museum and Sculpture Garden

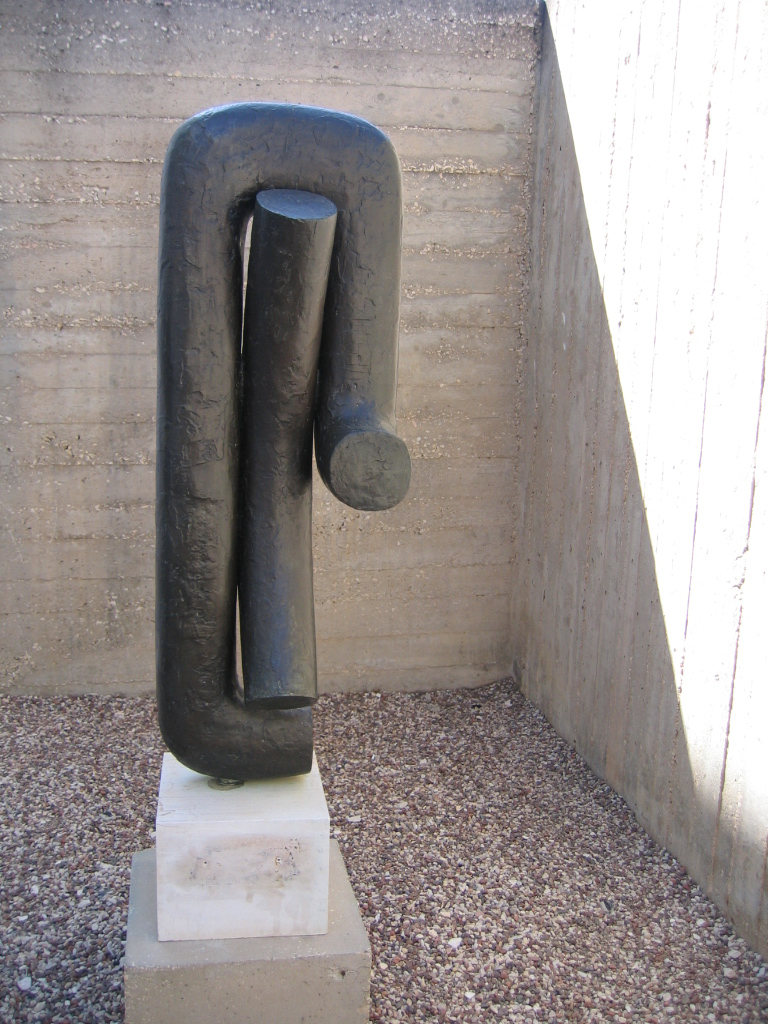
Isamu Noguchi (1904–1988), Heimar, 1968, at the Billy Rose Sculpture Garden, Israel Museum, Jerusalem, Israel

George Rickey (1904–2002), Four Squares in Geviert, 1969, terrace of the New National Gallery, Berlin, Germany

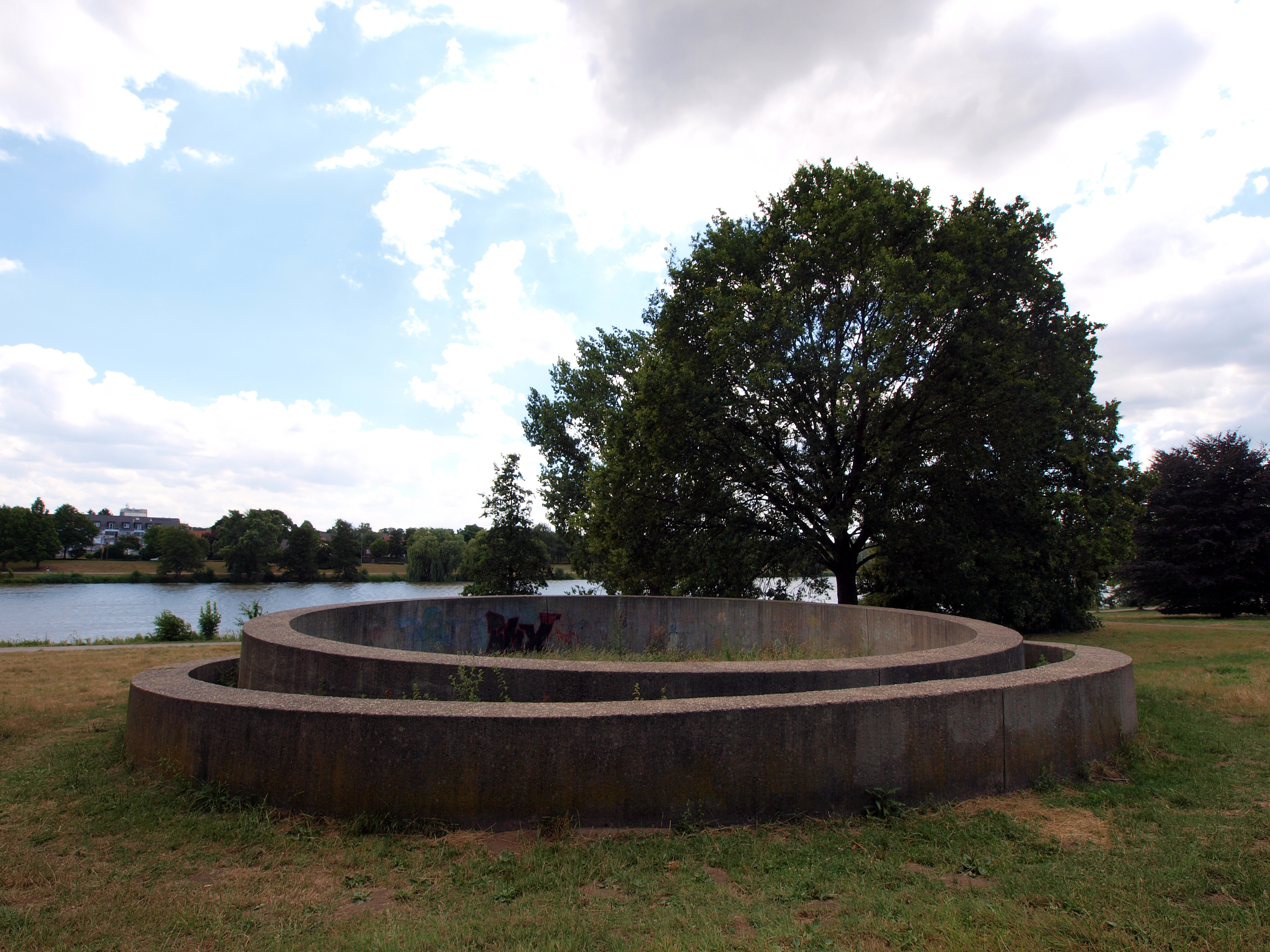
Donald Judd (1928–1994), Untitled 1977, Münster, Germany

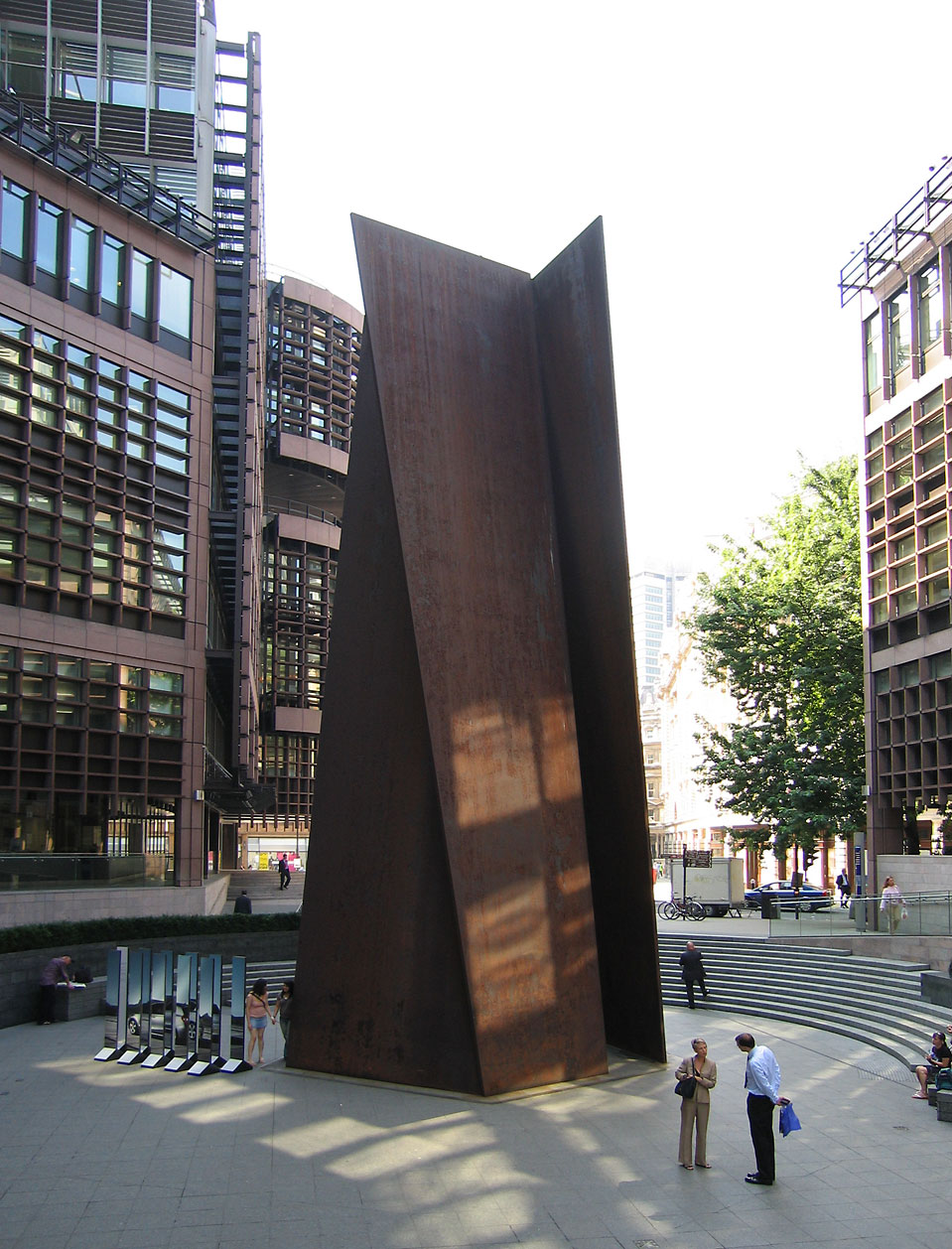
Richard Serra (born 1939), Fulcrum 1987, 55 ft high free standing sculpture of Cor-ten steel near Liverpool Street station, London

=== Pushing the boundaries of art ===
The figure returned in the 1960s, but without the beaux-arts figurative tradition, sometimes even as life-casts like those George Segal made with plaster. Jim Gary created life-sized figures composed of metal washers and hardware almost invisibly welded together, as well as those of stained glass and even used automobile parts and tools in his sculptures.

Concerns for the qualities of forms and design continued — but usually without representing a human figure. Minimalist sculpture by artists such as Richard Serra and Norman Carlberg often replaced the figure in public settings. Sculpture of the late 20th century was mostly a playful exploration of the boundaries of what could be called art.

=== Minimalism ===
The Minimalist style reduces sculpture to its most essential and fundamental features. Minimalists include Tony Smith, Donald Judd, Robert Morris, Larry Bell, Anne Truitt, and Dan Flavin;

=== Site-specific movement ===
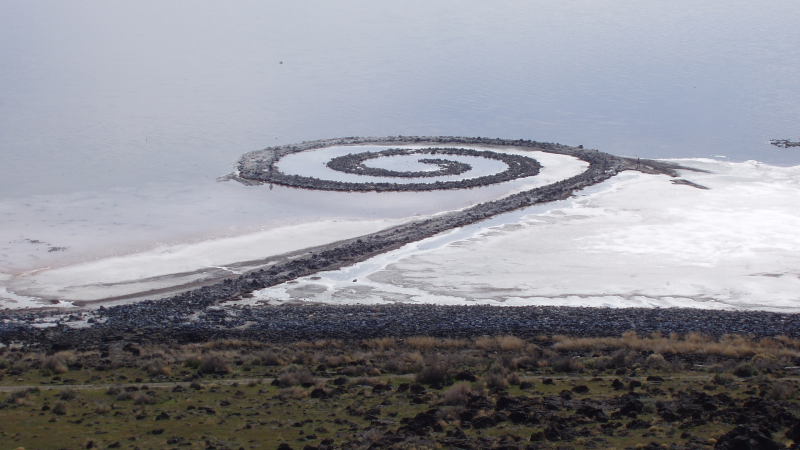
Spiral Jetty by Robert Smithson from atop Rozel Point, in mid-April 2005

Site specific and environmental art works are represented by artists: Donald Judd, Dennis Oppenheim, Richard Serra, Robert Irwin, George Rickey, and Christo and Jeanne-Claude led contemporary abstract sculpture in new directions. Artists created environmental sculpture on expansive sites in the 'land art in the American West' group of projects. These land art or 'earth art' environmental scale sculpture works exemplified by artists such as Robert Smithson, Michael Heizer, James Turrell (Roden Crater) and others The land art (earth art) environmental scale sculpture works by Robert Smithson, Michael Heizer, James Turrell and others.

=== Postminimalism ===
Artists Bill Bollinger, Eva Hesse, Sol LeWitt, Jackie Winsor, Keith Sonnier, Bruce Nauman, and Lucas Samaras, among others were pioneers of Postminimalist sculpture. The later works of Robert Graham continued evolving, often in public art settings, into the 21st century.

Also during the 1960s and 1970s artists as diverse as Stephen Antonakis, Chryssa, Walter De Maria, Dan Flavin, Robert Smithson, Dennis Oppenheim, Robert Irwin, Claes Oldenburg, George Segal, Edward Kienholz, Duane Hanson, and John DeAndrea explored abstraction, imagery and figuration through Light sculpture, Land art, and installation art in new ways.

=== Late 20th-century revival of figurative sculpture ===
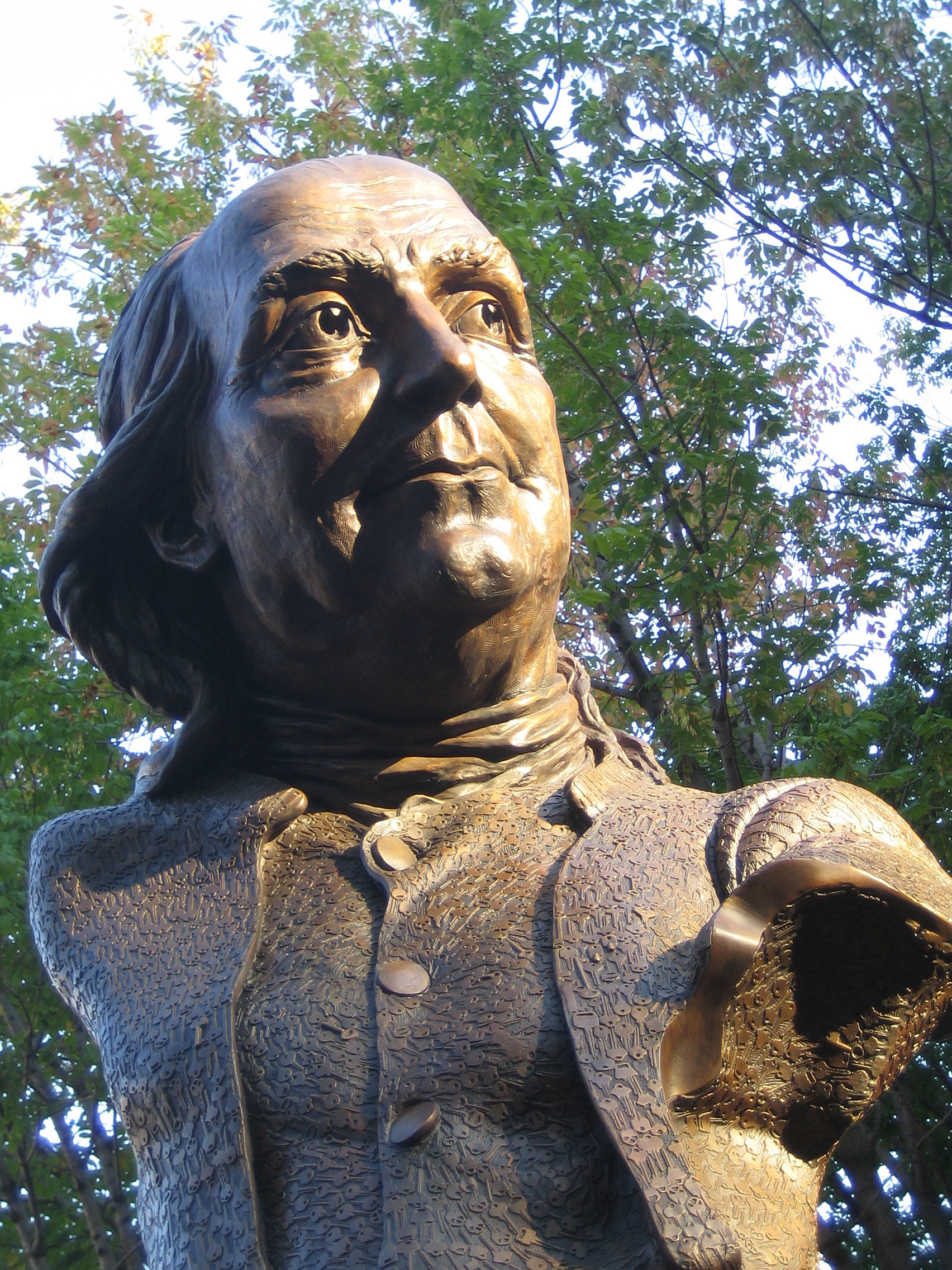
Keys To Community (2007), James Peniston, Philadelphia, Pennsylvania

Other kinds of sculpture grew in importance, some evolving from the work of leaders in ironwork during the early 1900s who included Samuel Yellin. A center for the western style of American sculpture developed at Loveland, Colorado, and many studios, magazines, and even a museum (the National Cowboy & Western Heritage Museum in Oklahoma City) pursued this interest. A neo-Victorian style emerged, pioneered by the sculptor Frederick Hart.

=== Other genres of sculpture ===
The art-doll and ceramic sculpture communities also grew in numbers and importance in the late 20th century, while the entertainment industry required large-scale, spectacular (sometimes monstrous or cartoon-like) sculpture for movie sets, theme parks, casinos, and athletic stadiums. Industrial product design, especially automobiles, should not be ignored. An example is Randolph Parducci's (brother of Corrado Parducci) sculptures created for the famous chariot race scene in the film Ben Hur.

== Legal issues regarding photographs ==
United States courts have consistently held that sculptors maintain an intellectual property right to sculptures and are entitled to compensation if photographs are used for commercial purposes. The rights apply even if the sculptor no longer owns the sculpture or the sculpture is not even in a public space. The sculptor, however, could sign away those rights. Some other countries, such as Germany, give permission to take the photographs via the concept of Panoramafreiheit, or Freedom of Panorama.

Photograph of Frank Gaylord's Korean War Veterans Memorial sculpture

On February 25, 2010, the United States Court of Appeals for the Federal Circuit ruled 2-1 that the Frank Gaylord, sculptor of the Korean War Veterans Memorial, was entitled to compensation because an image of it was used on a 37 cent U. S. postage stamp and he had not signed away his intellectual property rights. The appeals court rejected arguments that the photo was transformative.

In 2002, amateur photographer and retired Marine John All was paid $1,500 to use one of his photographs of the memorial on a snowy day for the stamp which sold more than $17 million worth of stamps. In 2006, sculptor Frank Gaylord enlisted Fish & Richardson to make a pro bono claim that the U. S. Postal Service had violated his intellectual property rights to the sculpture and thus he should have been compensated. The Postal Service argued that Gaylord was not the sole sculptor (saying he had received advice from federal sources – who recommended that the uniforms appear more in the wind) and also that the sculpture was actually architecture. Gaylord won all of his arguments in the lower court except for one...the court ruled the photo was fair use and thus he was not entitled to compensation. Gaylord appealed the fair use ruling and won the case on appeal. On April 22, 2011, The US Court of Claims awarded Gaylord $5,000.

== See also ==
- Statues of the National Statuary Hall Collection
- Pedimental sculptures in the United States
- History of sculpture
