= Economy of Germany =

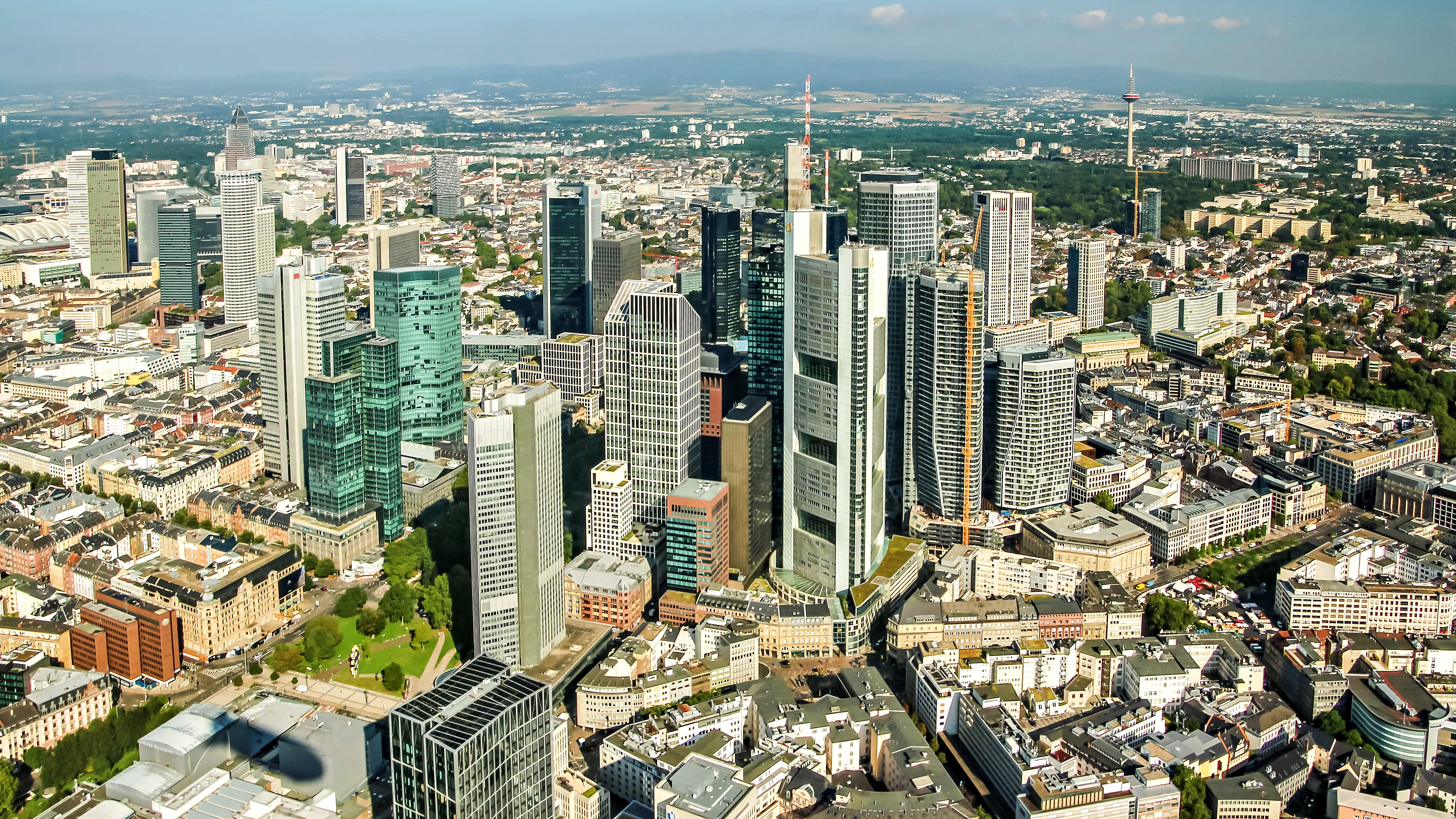
- Frankfurt, the financial centre of Germany
- Currency: Euro (EUR, €)
- Fiscal year: Calendar year
- Trade organisations: EU, WTO, G-20, G7 and OECD
- Country group: Advanced economy; High-income economy; Welfare state

Statistics
- Population: ▼83,467,117 (2026 est.)
- GDP: ▲$5.45 trillion (nominal; 2026f); ▲$6.408 trillion (PPP; 2026f)
- GDP rank: 3rd (nominal; 2026); 6th (PPP; 2026)
- GDP growth: 0.8% (2026)
- GDP per capita: ▲$65,303 (nominal; 2026f); ▲$76,747 (PPP; 2026f)
- GDP per capita rank: 17th (nominal; 2026); 21st (PPP; 2026)
- GDP per capita growth: 0.3% (2025)
- GDP by sector: Agriculture: 0.7%; Industry: 28.1%; Services: 62.6%; (2023 est.)
- GDP by component: Household consumption: 53.1%; Government consumption: 19.5%; Investment in fixed capital: 20.4%; Investment in inventories: −0.5%; Exports of goods and services: 47.3%; Imports of goods and services: −38.7%; (2017)
- Inflation (CPI): ▲1.94% (2026f)
- Population below national poverty line: ▼21.2% at risk of poverty or social exclusion (AROPE 2025)
- Gini coefficient: ▲29.5 low (2024)
- Human Development Index: ▲0.959 very high (2023) (5th); ▲0.890 very high (2023) (IHDI 8th)
- Corruption Perceptions Index: ▼78 out of 100 points (2024) (rank 15th)
- Labour force: 50 million (2023); 81.1% employment rate (2023)
- Labour force by occupation: Agriculture: 1.4%; Industry: 24.2%; Services: 74.3%; (2016)
- Unemployment: 5.4% (2022); 2.0 million unemployed (August 2020)
- Youth unemployment: ▲6.9% (2025)
- Average gross salary: €5,274 monthly (2024)
- Average net salary: €3,300 monthly (2024)
- Main industries: High-technology; iron; steel; coal; cement; chemicals; machinery; vehicles; machine tools; electronics; automobiles; food and beverages; shipbuilding; defence; textiles; information technology; renewable energy; biotechnology; pharmaceutical

External
- Exports: ▲$1.774 trillion (2024)
- Export goods: Motor vehicles, machinery, chemicals, computer and electronic products, electrical equipment, pharmaceuticals, metals, transport equipment, foodstuffs, textiles, rubber and plastic products
- Main export partners: European Union 55.8%; United States 9.4%; China 5.2%; United Kingdom 5.1%; (2025)
- Imports: ▲$1.545 trillion (2025)
- Import goods: Machinery, data processing equipment, vehicles, chemicals, oil and gas, metals, electric equipment, pharmaceuticals, foodstuffs, agricultural products
- Main import partners: European Union 51.5%; China 12.5%; United States 6.9%; United Kingdom 2.8%; (2025)
- FDI stock: $1.653 trillion (2017); Abroad: $2.298 trillion (2017)
- Gross external debt: $5.4 trillion (2022)

Public finance
- Government debt: 63.6% of GDP (2023); €2.6 trillion (2023)
- Foreign reserves: $400 billion (2022)
- Budget balance: €102 billion deficit (2023); −2.5% of GDP (2023)
- Revenue: 46.1% of GDP (2023)
- Spending: 48.6% of GDP (2023)
- Economic aid: €26 billion from European Structural and Investment Funds (2007–2013); €27.87 billion from European Structural and Investment Funds (2014–2020)
- Credit rating: Standard & Poor's: AAA; Outlook: Stable; Moody's: Aaa; Outlook: Stable; Fitch: AAA; Outlook: Stable; Scope: AAA; Outlook: Stable
- All values, unless otherwise stated, are in US dollars.

Germany has a social market economy. As the largest economy in Europe by nominal GDP, Germany's highly developed economy is the third-largest by nominal GDP in the world, as well as the sixth-largest by PPP-adjusted GDP. Due to a volatile currency exchange rate, Germany's GDP as measured in dollars fluctuates sharply, but has ranked among the world's top four since 1960. In 2025, Germany accounted for 23.7% of the economy in the eurozone, with which it has achieved a high degree of economic integration. With a population of around 83 million people, Germany represents the largest consumer market in the European Union. It is a founding member of both the European Union and the Eurozone.

Germany is the third-largest exporter globally, with $1.66 trillion worth of goods and services exported in 2024. In 2024, Germany recorded a trade surplus of $255 billion, ranking 2nd worldwide. The service sector contributes around 70% of the total GDP, industry 29.1%, and agriculture 0.9%. Exports account for 50.3% of national output. The main exports of Germany are vehicles, machinery, chemicals, electronics, electrical equipment, pharmaceuticals, transport equipment, basic metals, food products, rubber, and plastics. Germany possesses the largest manufacturing economy in Europe, contributing around one third of all manufacturing in Europe. The Germany social security system comprises roughly 25% of GDP, which is high among OECD members. Germany has the world's second-largest gold reserves, with over 3,000 tonnes of gold. As of 2023, Germany spends around 3.1% of GDP, third among major economies, on research and development. It is also the world's second-largest high-technology exporter and ranks in the top 10 of countries by stock market capitalization.

Nearly all German companies belong to the German Mittelstand, mostly family-owned small and medium-sized enterprises. These companies represent 48% of the global market leaders in their segments, labelled hidden champions. Of the world's 500 largest publicly listed companies measured by revenue, the Fortune Global 500, 29 are headquartered in Germany, as are 26 of Europe's 100 largest. Germany is home to many financial centres and economically important cities, such as Berlin, Hamburg, Munich, Cologne, Frankfurt, and Stuttgart. Four German banks are among the 100 largest in the world. Germany is the world's top location for trade fairs; around two thirds of the world's leading trade fairs take place in Germany. Some of the largest international trade fairs and congresses are held in several German cities such as Hanover, Frankfurt, Cologne, Leipzig, and Düsseldorf.

Germany is rich in natural resources such as timber, lignite, potash, and salt. Some minor sources of natural gas are being exploited in the state of Lower Saxony. Until German reunification, the German Democratic Republic mined for uranium in the Ore Mountains. Energy production in Germany uses fossil fuels for around a third of energy needs, along with wind, solar, biomass and hydroelectric. Germany has committed to a large-scale renewable energy transition, known as the Energiewende. In 2024, renewable energy sources accounted for 59% of Germany's total electricity generation, and Germany has been described by some as "the world's first major renewable energy economy".

== History ==
Real GDP per capita development in Germany since 1820

=== Industrialization ===
The Industrial Revolution in Germany got underway approximately a century later than in the United Kingdom, France, and Belgium, partly because Germany only became a unified country in 1871.

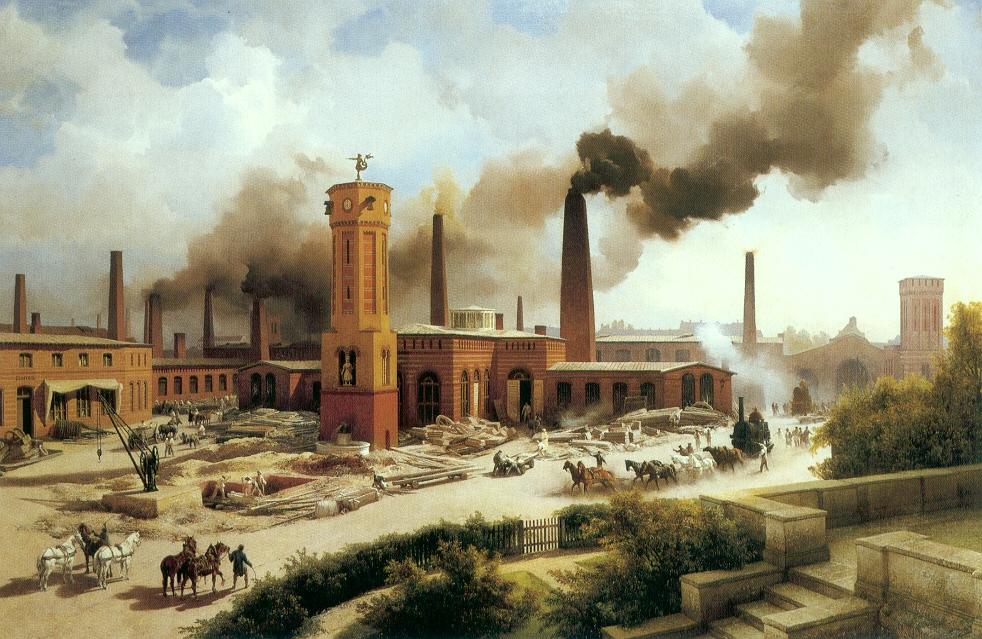
Train factory of August Borsig in 1847

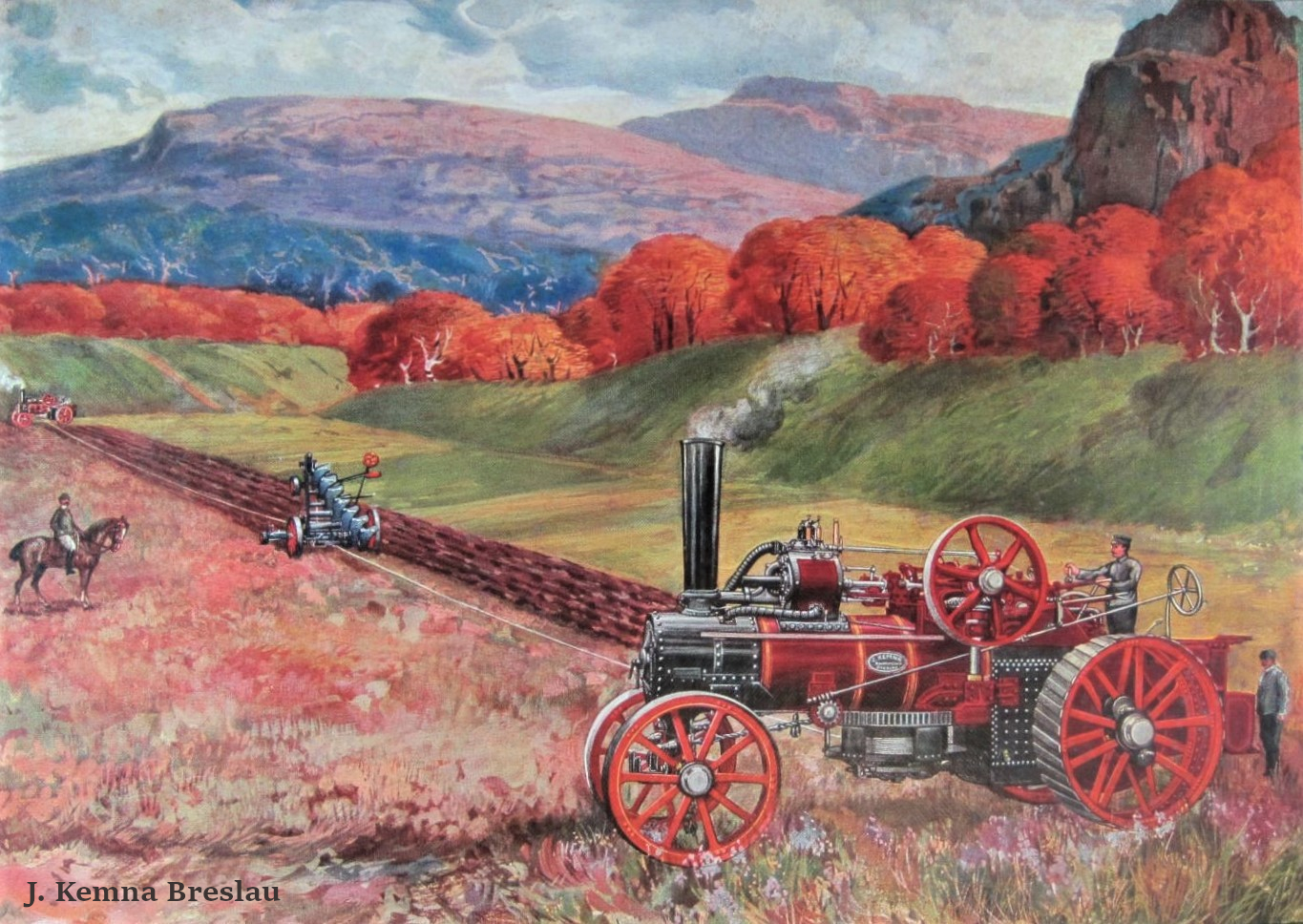
Many companies, such as steam-machine producer J. Kemna, modelled themselves on English industry.

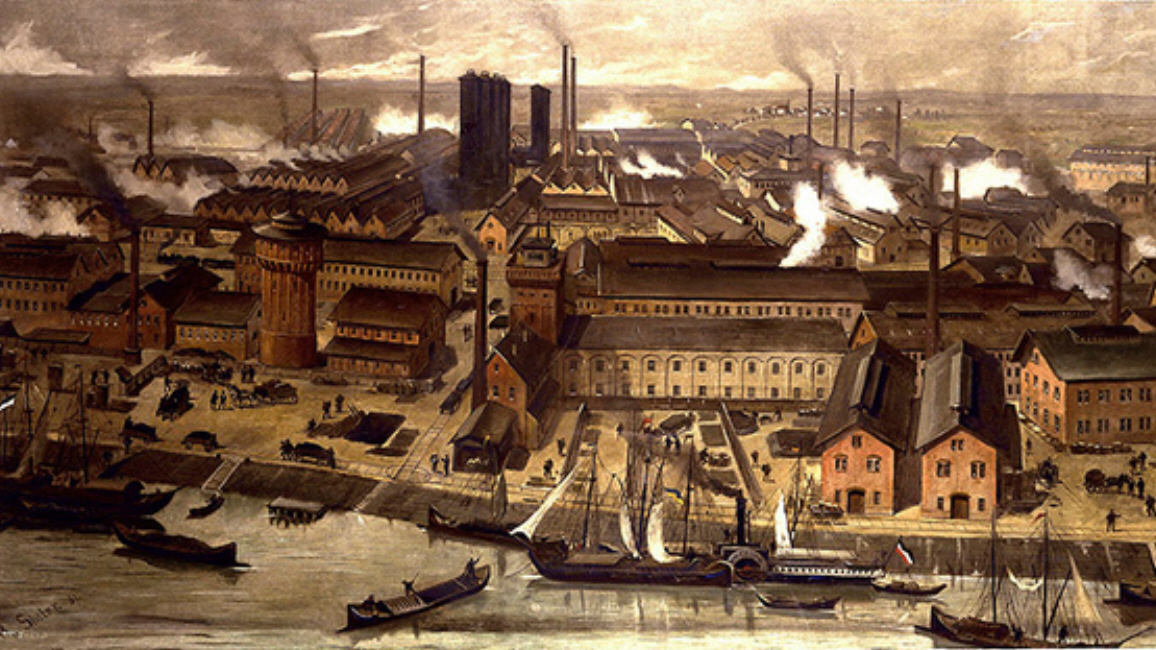
BASF plant in Ludwigshafen, 1881

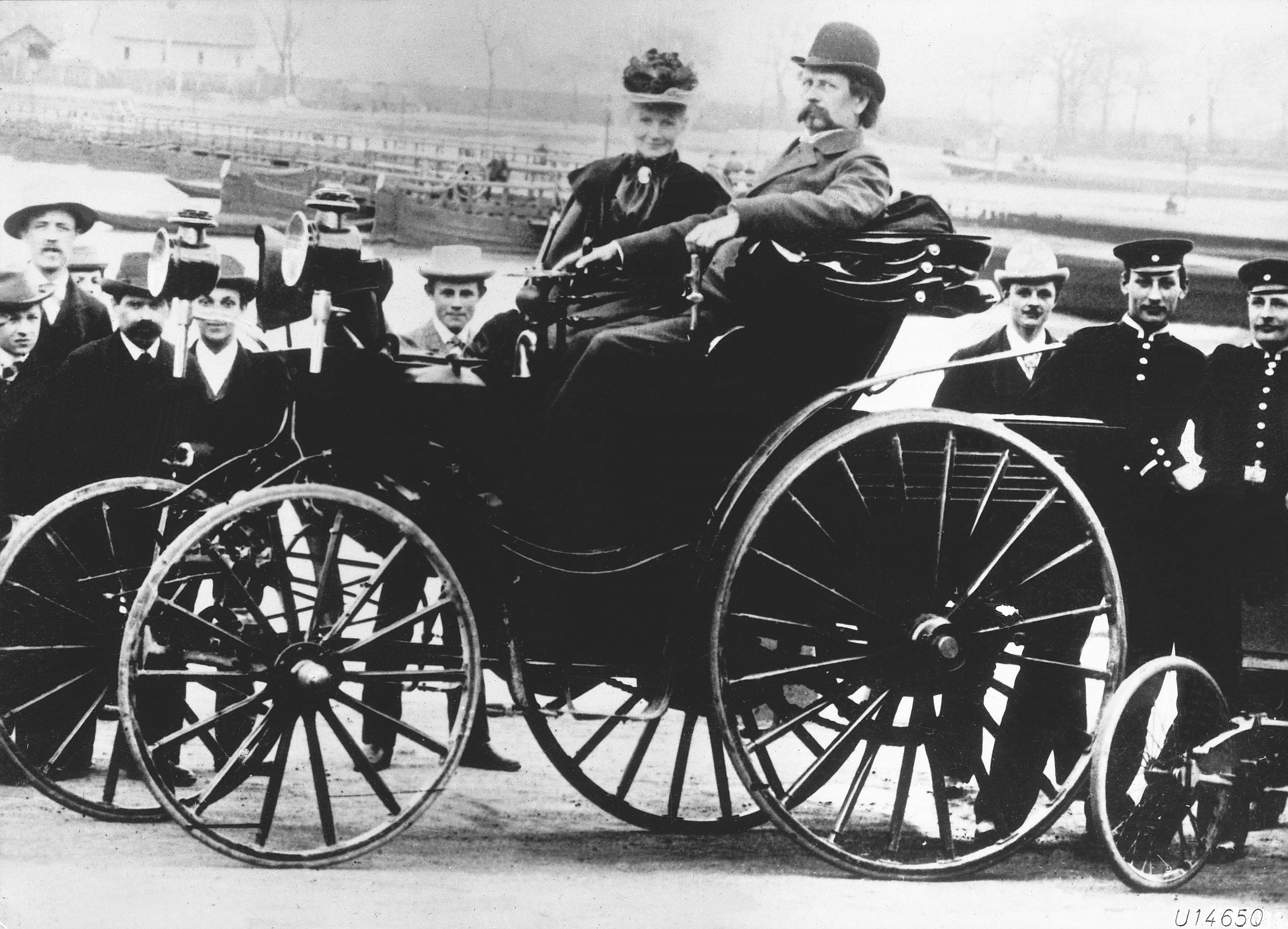
The invention of the automobile. Bertha Benz and Karl Benz in a Benz Viktoria, model 1894

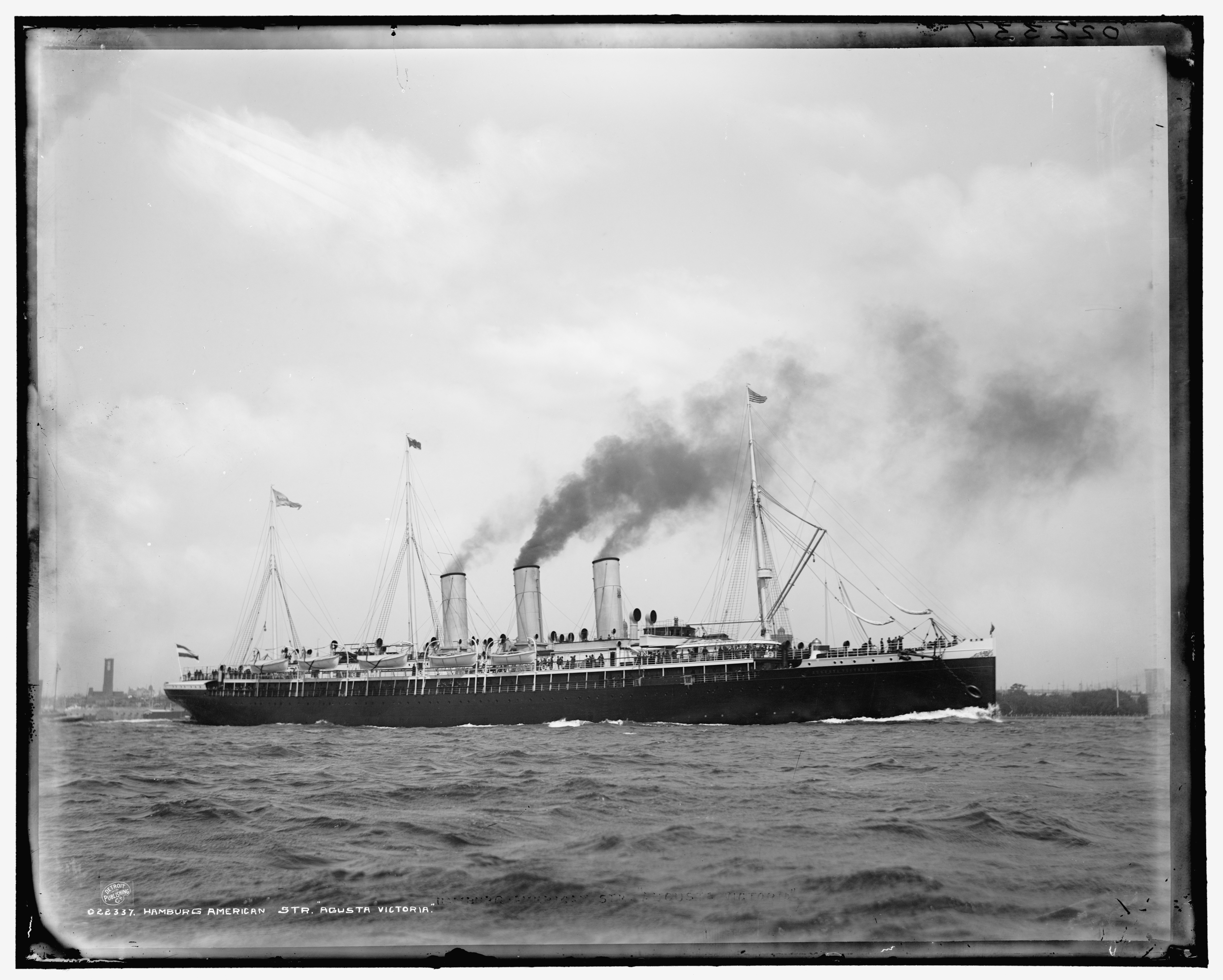
The invention of the cruise ship. Albert Ballin's SS Auguste Viktoria in 1890

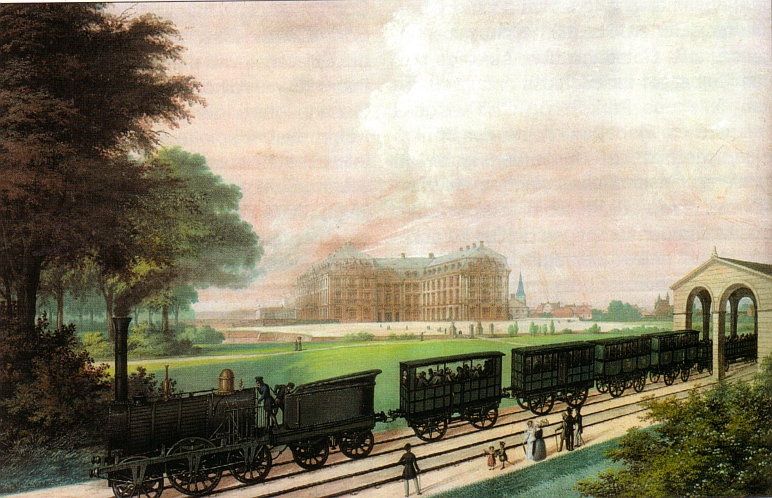
Railway construction as an expression of the Industrial Revolution (here the Bonn-Cölner railway around 1844)

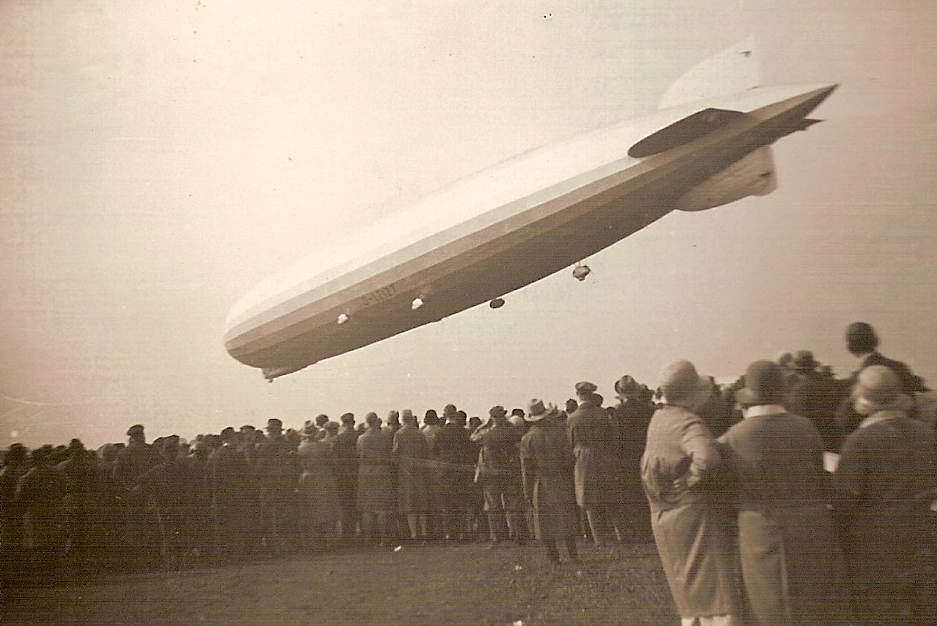
The LZ 127 Graf Zeppelin of DELAG, the world's first airline

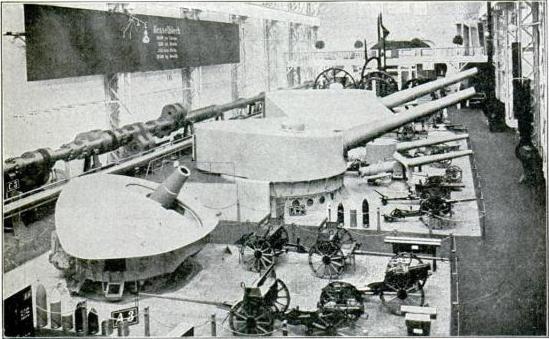
Krupp factory in Essen (c. 1905), when Krupp was Europe's largest company

The establishment of the Deutscher Zollverein (German Customs Union) in 1834 and the expansion of railway systems were the main drivers of Germany's industrial development and political union. From 1834, tariff barriers between increasing numbers of the Kleindeutschland German states were eliminated. In 1835 the first German railway linked the Franconian cities of Nuremberg and Fürth – it proved so successful that the decade of the 1840s saw "railway mania" in all the German states. Between 1845 and 1870, 8,000 kilometres (5,000 mi) of rail had been built and in 1850 Germany was building its own locomotives. Over time, other German states joined the customs union and started linking their railroads, which began to connect the corners of Germany. The growth of free trade and a rail system across Germany intensified economic development which opened up new markets for local products, created a pool of middle managers, increased the demand for engineers, architects, and skilled machinists, and stimulated investments in coal and iron.

Another factor that propelled German industry forward was the unification of the monetary system, made possible in part by political unification. The Deutsche Mark, a new monetary coinage system backed by gold, was introduced in 1871. However, this system did not fully come into use as silver coins retained their value until 1907.

The victory of Prussia and her allies over Napoleon III of France in the Franco-Prussian War of 1870-1871 marked the end of French hegemony in Europe and resulted in the proclamation of the German Empire in 1871. The establishment of the empire inherently presented Europe with the reality of a new populous and industrialising polity possessing a considerable, and undeniably increasing, economic and diplomatic presence. The influence of French economic principles produced important institutional reforms in Germany, including the abolition of feudal restrictions on the sale of large landed estates, the reduction of the power of the guilds in the cities, and the introduction of a new, more efficient commercial law. Nonetheless, political decisions about the economy of the empire were still largely controlled by a coalition of "rye and iron", that is the Prussian Junker landowners of the east and the Ruhr heavy industry of the west.

Regarding politics and society, between 1881 and 1889 Chancellor Otto von Bismarck promoted laws that provided social insurance and improved working conditions. He instituted the world's first welfare state. Germany was the first to introduce social insurance programmes including universal healthcare, compulsory education, sickness insurance, accident insurance, disability insurance, and a retirement pension. Moreover, the government's universal education policy bore fruit with Germany achieving the highest literacy rate in the world – 99% – education levels that provided the nation with more people good at handling numbers, more engineers, chemists, opticians, skilled workers for its factories, skilled managers, knowledgeable farmers, and skilled military personnel.

By 1900, Germany surpassed Britain in steel production and became the largest producer behind only the United States. The German economic miracle was also intensified by unprecedented population growth from 35 million in 1850 to 67 million in 1913. From 1895 to 1907, the number of workers engaged in machine building doubled from half a million to well over a million. Only 40 percent of Germans lived in rural areas by 1910, a drop from 67% at the birth of the Empire. Industry accounted for 60 percent of the gross national product in 1913. The German chemical industry became the most advanced in the world, and by 1914 the country was producing half the world's electrical equipment.

The rapid advance to industrial maturity led to a drastic shift in Germany's economic situation – from a rural economy into a major exporter of finished goods. The ratio of the finished product to total exports jumped from 38% in 1872 to 63% in 1912. By 1913 Germany had come to dominate all the European markets. By 1914 Germany had become one of the biggest exporters in the world.

=== Weimar Republic and Third Reich ===
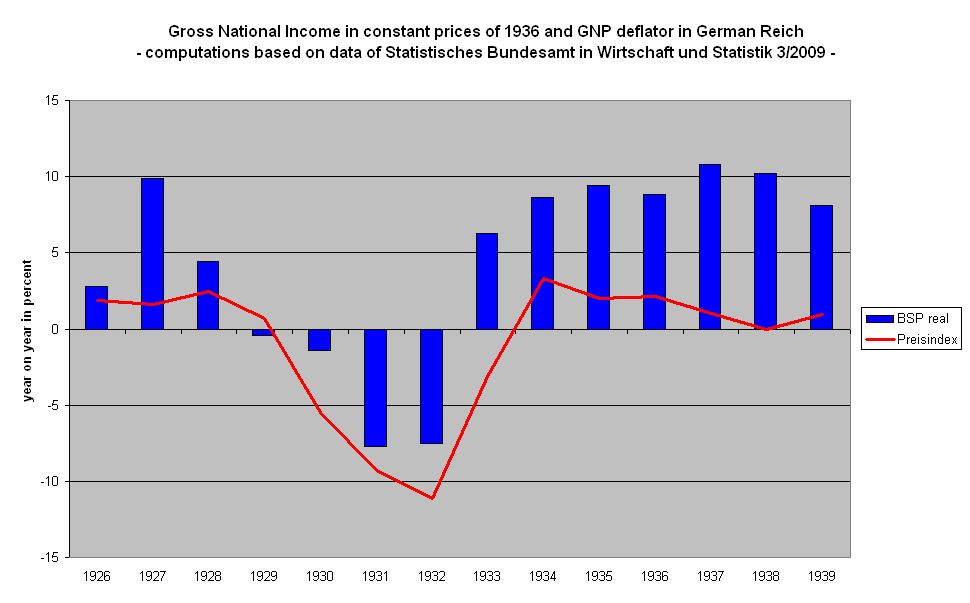
Gross national product and GNP deflator, year on year change in %, 1926 to 1939, in Germany.

Occupation by administrative district in the 1925 census

The Nazis rose to power while unemployment was very high, but achieved full employment later thanks to massive public works programmes such as the Reichsbahn, Reichspost, and the Reichsautobahn projects. In 1935 rearmament in contravention of the Treaty of Versailles added to the economy.

The post-1931 financial crisis economic policies of expansionary fiscal policies (as Germany was off the gold standard) was advised by their non-Nazi Minister of Economics, Hjalmar Schacht, who in 1933 became the president of the central bank. Schacht later resigned from the post in 1938 and was replaced by Hermann Göring.

The trading policies of the Third Reich aimed at self-sufficiency, but with a lack of raw materials, Germany had to maintain trade links but on bilateral preferences, foreign exchange controls, import quotas, and export subsidies under what was called the "New Plan" (Neuer Plan) of September 19th, 1934. The "New Plan" was based on trade with less developed countries who would trade raw materials for German industrial goods saving currency. Southern Europe was preferable to Western Europe and North America as there could be no trade blockades. This policy became known as the Grosswirtschaftsraum ("greater economic area") policy.

Eventually, the Nazi party developed strong relationships with big business and abolished trade unions in 1933 in order to form the Reich Labour Service (RAD), German Labour Front (DAF) to set working hours, Beauty of Labour (SDA) which set working conditions, and Strength through Joy (KDF) to ensure sports clubs for workers.

=== West Germany ===
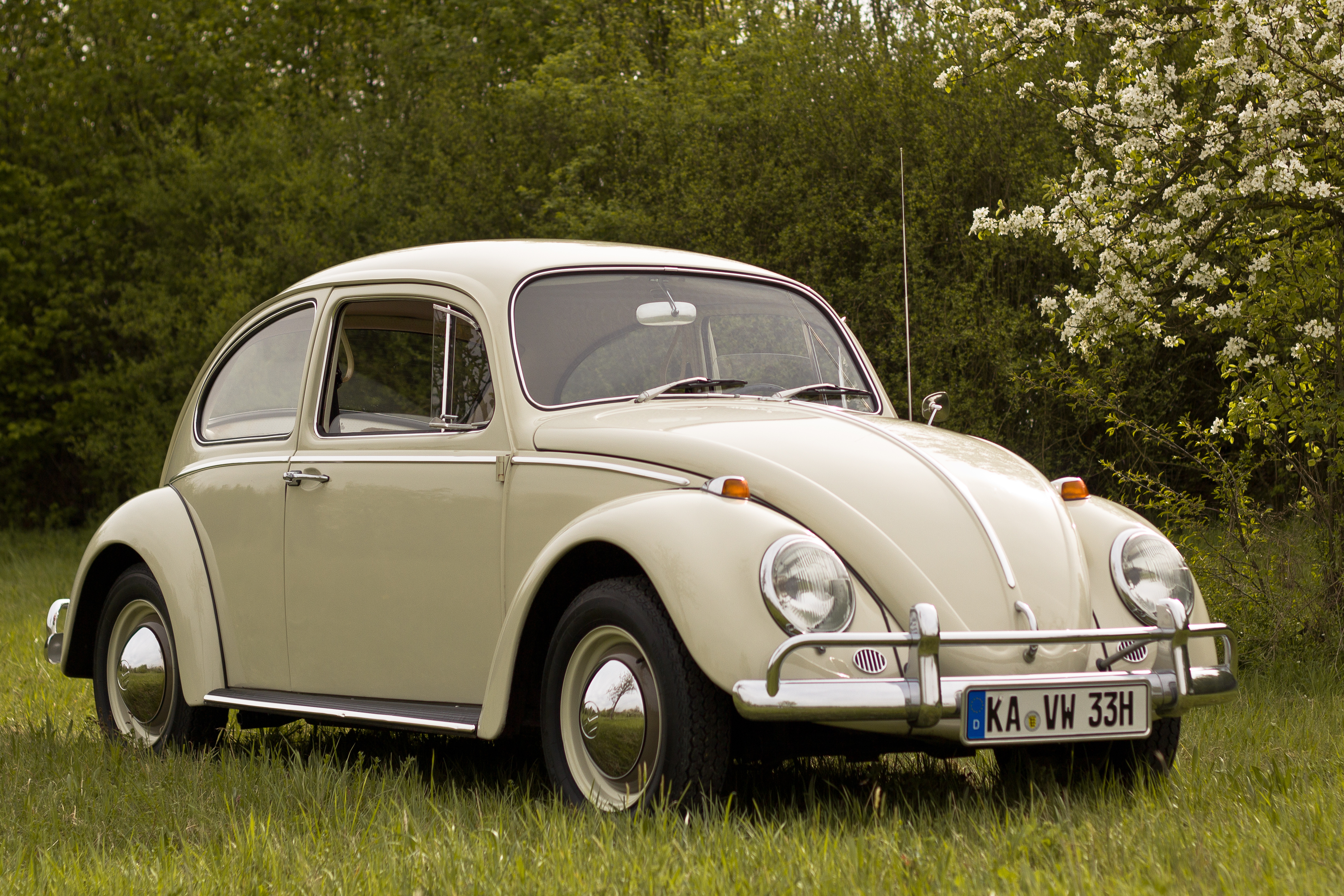
The Volkswagen Beetle was an icon of West German reconstruction.

Beginning with the replacement of the Reichsmark with the Deutsche Mark as legal tender, a lasting period of low inflation and rapid industrial growth was overseen by the government led by German Chancellor Konrad Adenauer and his minister of economics, Ludwig Erhard, raising West Germany from total wartime devastation to one of the most developed nations in modern Europe.

In 1953 it was decided that Germany was to repay $1.1 billion of the aid it had received. The last repayment was made in June 1971.

Apart from these factors, hard work and long hours at full capacity among the population in the 1950s, 1960s, and early 1970s and extra labour supplied by thousands of Gastarbeiter ("guest workers") provided a vital base for the economic upturn.

=== East Germany ===
By the early 1950s, the Soviet Union had seized reparations in the form of agricultural and industrial products and demanded further heavy reparation payments. Silesia with the Upper Silesian Coal Basin, and Stettin, a prominent natural port, were lost to Poland.

Exports from West Germany exceeded $323 billion in 1988. In the same year, East Germany exported $30.7 billion worth of goods; 65% to other communist states. East Germany had zero unemployment.

=== Federal Republic ===
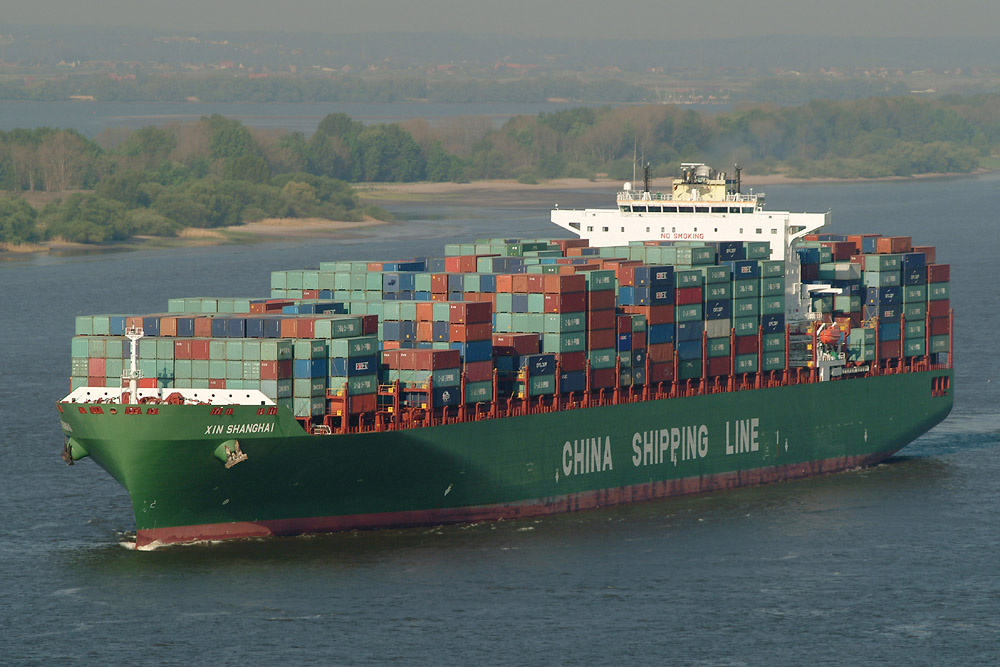
As of 2024, Germany is the third-largest exporter and third-largest importer in the world, producing the second-largest trade surplus.

The German economy practically stagnated in the beginning of the 2000s. The worst growth figures were achieved in 2002 (+1.4%), in 2003 (+1.0%), and in 2005 (+1.4%). Unemployment was also chronically high. Due to these problems, together with Germany's aging population, the welfare system came under considerable strain. This led the government to push through a wide-ranging programme of belt-tightening reforms, Agenda 2010, including the labour market reforms known as Hartz I - IV.

In the later part of the first decade of 2000, the world economy experienced high growth, from which Germany as a leading exporter also profited. Some credit the Hartz reforms with achieving high growth and declining unemployment but others contend that they resulted in a massive decrease in standards of living and that its effects are limited and temporary.

The nominal GDP of Germany contracted in the second and third quarters of 2008, putting the country in a technical recession following a global and European recession cycle. German industrial output dropped to 3.6% in September vis-à-vis August. In January 2009 the German government under Angela Merkel approved a €50 billion ($70 billion) economic stimulus plan to protect several sectors from a downturn and a subsequent rise in unemployment rates. Germany exited the recession in the second and third quarters of 2009, mostly due to rebounding manufacturing orders and exports - primarily from outside the eurozone - and relatively steady consumer demand.

Germany is a founding member of the EU, the G8, and the G20, and was the world's largest exporter from 2003 to 2008. In 2011 it remained the third largest exporter and third largest importer. Most of the country's exports are in engineering, especially machinery, automobiles, chemical goods, and metals. Germany is a leading producer of wind turbines and solar-power technology. Annual trade fairs and congresses are held in cities throughout Germany. 2011 was a record-breaking year for the German economy. German companies exported goods worth over €1 trillion ($1.3 trillion), the highest figure in history. The number of people in work has risen to 41.6 million, the highest recorded figure.

Through 2012, Germany's economy continued to be stronger relative to local neighbouring nations. In 2023, Germany experienced economic difficulties as a result of the closure of Russian natural gas resources due to international sanctions following the Russian invasion of Ukraine. Germany imported 55% of its gas from Russia at the time when Russia started the invasion in 2022. Amid a global energy crisis, Chancellor Olaf Scholz committed to weaken dependence on Russian energy imports by halting certification of Nord Stream 2, while also committing to his long-term predecessor Angela Merkel's policy of phasing out nuclear energy.

As of December 2023, Germany is the third largest economy in nominal terms in the world after the United States and China, and the largest economy in Europe. It is the third largest export nation in the world. In April 2024, a report by the German Economic Institute revealed that despite attempts to expand into other markets, the German economy remains heavily reliant on China for various products and raw materials.

During the 2020s, Germany has faced significant economic troubles and entered a multiyear recession. During 2024, the German economy experienced its second consecutive year of contraction. Europe's largest economy declined by 0.2% over the year, following a 0.3% contraction in 2023. Germany's trade surplus with the United States, reported by Reuters to have reached a record €65 billion (£54.7 billion) during the first 11 months of 2024, has made the nation a likely target for potential tariffs from Donald Trump's administration. The economic climate has also been affected by widespread layoffs across major German corporations. Companies such as Siemens, Bosch, Thyssenkrupp, and Deutsche Bahn, all featured in the Fortune 500, are estimated to have collectively cut over 60,000 jobs during the first 10 months of 2024. Bosch, a highly regarded manufacturing firm, announced in November alone plans to reduce its workforce by approximately 7,000 employees. Also, the Mittelstand experienced a significant downturn in the 2020s due to competition from China.

Amid the extent of Germany's continued reliance on fossil fuels, specifically oil imports from Russia, was made evident following the Russian Invasion of Ukraine in February in 2022 and since then, Germany has faced ongoing and significant economic troubles. Russia's sudden withdrawal from western markets would cause major economic disruptions in Germany, already recovering from the effects of the Covid-19 pandemic, as energy prices in Europe soared throughout 2022. This resulted in an inflationary period, which by winter of that year (when energy is most in demand and thus most expensive) had reached 8.6%. Although by the end of 2025 contraction had technically ceased, with a modest GDP increase of between 0.2 and 0.3%, the situation remains fraught, characterized by rising costs, unemployment, falling productivity, and stagnation in a general atmosphere of economic malaise. On January 1, 2026, Chancellor Friedrich Merz stated that "certain sectors" of the German economy are in "critical condition." On January 31st, Merz and Vice-Chancellor Federal Minister of Finance Lars Klingbeil announced the beginning of large-scale stimulus spending on infrastructure and defence.

== Data ==
The following table shows the main economic indicators in 1980–2025 (with IMF staff estimates in 2026–2031). Inflation below 5% is in green.

Year	GDP (Bil. US$PPP)	GDP per capita (US$ PPP)	GDP (Bil. US$nominal)	GDP per capita (US$ nominal)	GDP growth (real)	Inflation rate (Percent)	Unemployment (Percent)	Government debt (in % of GDP)
1980	922.3	12,001.9	856.8	11,150.4	▲1.3	▲5.4	3.4	n/a
1981	▲1,010.6	▲13,127.1	▼720.9	▼9,363.8	▲0.1	▲6.3	▲4.8	n/a
1982	▲1,064.6	▲13,838.3	▼696.1	▼9,048.0	▼-0.8	▲5.3	▲6.7	n/a
1983	▲1,123.5	▲14,654.9	▼694.4	▲9,058.3	▲1.6	▲3.3	▲8.1	n/a
1984	▲1,197.0	▲15,676.2	▼654.3	▼8,569.0	▲2.8	▲2.4	8.1	n/a
1985	▲1,261.9	▲16,567.4	▲663.5	▲8,710.7	▲2.2	▲2.1	8.1	n/a
1986	▲1,318.4	▲17,297.6	▲947.6	▲12,432.4	▲2.4	▼-0.1	▼7.8	n/a
1987	▲1,370.9	▲17,983.4	▲1,179.2	▲15,468.0	▲1.5	▲0.2	7.8	n/a
1988	▲1,472.3	▲19,196.2	▲1,271.3	▲16,575.2	▲3.7	▲1.3	▼7.7	n/a
1989	▲1,589.9	▲20,524.5	▼1,262.0	▼16,291.6	▲3.9	▲2.8	▼6.8	n/a
1990	▲1,743.8	▲22,087.7	▲1,604.5	▲20,323.3	▲5.7	▲2.7	▼6.2	n/a
1991	▲1,893.1	▲23,671.9	▲1,882.5	▲23,539.0	▲5.0	▲3.5	▼5.5	39.0
1992	▲1,975.3	▲24,538.4	▲2,146.1	▲26,660.2	▲2.0	▲5.0	▲6.6	▲41.4
1993	▲2,002.3	▲24,735.6	▼2,080.1	▼25,697.1	▼-1.0	▲4.5	▲7.8	▲45.1
1994	▲2,098.2	▲25,856.3	▲2,220.2	▲27,359.6	▲2.6	▲2.7	▲8.4	▲47.5
1995	▲2,174.6	▲26,744.9	▲2,595.3	▲31,919.0	▲1.5	▲1.7	▼8.2	▲54.9
1996	▲2,237.3	▲27,463.1	▼2,507.4	▼30,778.9	▲1.0	▲1.3	▲8.9	▲57.7
1997	▲2,318.1	▲28,439.6	▼2,221.5	▼27,254.3	▲1.9	▲1.5	▲9.7	▲58.8
1998	▲2,393.5	▲29,387.0	▲2,250.8	▲27,636.0	▲2.1	▲0.6	▼9.4	▲59.4
1999	▲2,478.9	▲30,445.2	▼2,216.1	▼27,216.9	▲2.1	▲0.6	▼8.6	▲60.3
2000	▲2,608.1	▲32,017.9	▼1,967.9	▼24,158.2	▲2.9	▲1.4	▼8.0	▼59.2
2001	▲2,710.3	▲33,248.7	▼1,966.4	▼24,122.4	▲1.6	▲1.9	▼7.8	▼58.1
2002	▲2,746.2	▲33,663.5	▲2,100.9	▲25,752.7	▼-0.2	▲1.3	▲8.6	▲59.8
2003	▲2,785.4	▲34,156.4	▲2,534.1	▲31,074.3	▼-0.5	▲1.1	▲9.7	▲63.3
2004	▲2,893.8	▲35,525.7	▲2,851.0	▲35,000.6	▲1.2	▲1.8	▲10.3	▲65.0
2005	▲3,011.0	▲37,018.6	▲2,895.0	▲35,592.5	▲0.9	▲2.0	▲11.0	▲67.1
2006	▲3,223.6	▲39,712.0	▲3,046.5	▲37,530.2	▲3.9	▲1.8	▼10.0	▼66.4
2007	▲3,406.6	▲42,060.9	▲3,484.5	▲43,021.8	▲2.9	▲2.3	▼8.5	▼63.7
2008	▲3,502.9	▲43,372.2	▲3,807.8	▲47,146.7	▲0.9	▲2.8	▼7.4	▲65.2
2009	▼3,329.1	▼41,363.4	▼3,474.8	▼43,173.7	▼-5.5	▲0.2	▼7.3	▲72.4
2010	▲3,509.1	▲43,708.4	▼3,469.9	▲43,220.1	▲4.1	▲1.1	▼6.6	▲81.0
2011	▲3,716.6	▲46,297.5	▲3,823.3	▲47,627.3	▲3.8	▲2.5	▼5.5	▼78.5
2012	▲3,805.0	▲47,333.6	▼3,600.6	▼44,790.9	▲0.5	▲2.1	▼5.1	▲79.8
2013	▲3,887.4	▲48,280.2	▲3,811.1	▲47,332.0	▲0.5	▲1.6	▼4.9	▼77.4
2014	▲4,043.8	▲50,073.0	▲3,971.2	▲49,173.9	▲2.2	▲0.8	▼4.7	▼74.4
2015	▲4,153.6	▲51,060.3	▼3,433.4	▼42,207.0	▲1.8	▲0.7	▼4.4	▼71.0
2016	▲4,289.3	▲52,393.1	▲3,546.5	▲43,320.2	▲2.3	▲0.4	▼3.9	▼68.1
2017	▲4,492.4	▲54,759.8	▲3,778.4	▲46,056.8	▲2.9	▲1.7	▼3.5	▼63.7
2018	▲4,691.8	▲57,108.0	▲4,076.8	▲49,622.5	▲1.2	▲1.9	▼3.2	▼60.5
2019	▲4,956.7	▲60,298.4	▼3,983.1	▼48,454.9	▲1.1	▲1.4	▼3.0	▼58.3
2020	▼4,920.1	▼59,908.9	▼3,969.0	▼48,328.5	▼-4.0	▲0.4	▲3.6	▲67.5
2021	▲5,289.4	▲64,508.7	▲4,394.5	▲53,595.4	▲4.0	▲3.2	3.6	▼67.4
2022	▲5,773.0	▲69,951.2	▼4,226.7	▼51,215.0	▲1.9	▲8.7	▼3.1	▼64.1
2023	▲5,928.5	▲71,182.0	▲4,602.0	▲55,255.6	▼-1.0	▲6.0	3.1	▼61.8
2024	▲6,080.8	▲72,809.2	▲4,746.9	▲56,837.8	0.0	▲2.5	▲3.4	▼61.4
2025	▲6,255.2	▲74,900.5	▲5,115.6	▲61,255.2	▲0.2	▲2.3	▲3.8	▲62.7
2026e	▲6,551.0	▲78,664.2	▲5,471.3	▲65,699.2	▲1.3	▲2.7	▲4.0	▲64.6
2027e	▲6,830.6	▲82,157.9	▲5,661.3	▲68,093.4	▲1.1	▲3.1	▼3.7	▲66.9
2028e	▲7,045.2	▲84,881.1	▲5,822.3	▲70,147.6	▲1.1	▲2.0	▼3.3	▲69.3
2029e	▲7,242.9	▲87,410.5	▲5,990.5	▲72,295.6	▲0.9	▲2.1	▼3.0	▲71.5
2030e	▲7,426.1	▲89,771.8	▲6,154.1	▲74,394.8	▲0.7	▲2.1	▼2.9	▲73.6
2031e	▲7,600.3	▲92,034.0	▲6,301.5	▲76,306.0	▲0.6	▲2.1	2.9	▲75.6

=== Companies ===
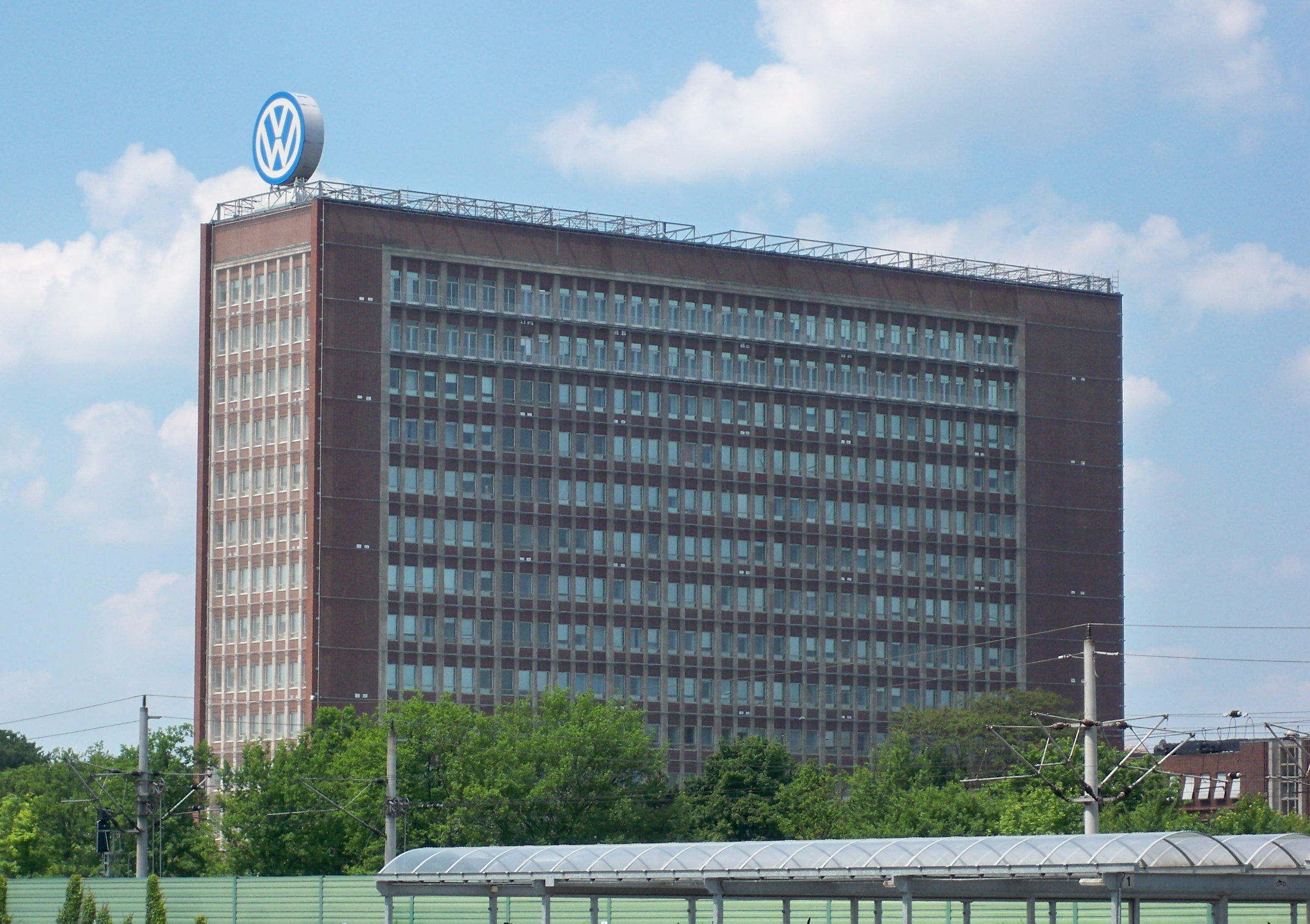
Volkswagen is the largest company in the European Union and the largest car manufacturer in the world by revenue.

Of the Fortune Global 500—the 500 largest stock market-listed companies measured by revenue—in 2024, 29 are headquartered in Germany. 40 Germany-based companies are included in the DAX—the most popular German stock market index—and 26 of Europe's 100 largest are German. Included among these listed companies are Allianz, the world's largest insurance company and one of the largest financial services groups and asset managers in Europe; Munich Re, one of the largest insurance companies; Daimler, Volkswagen, and BMW—each among the biggest car markers in the world; Siemens, the world's biggest industrial machinery company; Deutsche Telekom, one of the world's largest telecommunication companies; Bayer, among the biggest biomedical companies; BASF, the world's biggest chemical producer, and SAP, Europe's biggest software company. Other major companies include Lufthansa, Europe's largest airline; Deutsche Post, the largest logistics company worldwide; Deutsche Bahn, the largest railway company in the world; Bosch, the world's largest automotive supplier; and Aldi and Schwarz Gruppe, Europe's largest retailers.

Germany is recognised for its specialised small and medium enterprises, known as the Mittelstand model. SMEs account for more than 99 percent of German companies. Around 1,000 of these companies are global market leaders in their segment and are labelled hidden champions.

From 1991 to 2010, 40,301 mergers and acquisitions with an involvement of German firms with a total known value of 2,422 billion EUR have been announced. The largest transactions since 1991 are: the acquisition of Mannesmann by Vodafone for 204.8 billion EUR in 1999, the merger of Daimler-Benz with Chrysler to form DaimlerChrysler in 1998 valued at 36.3 billion EUR.

Berlin developed an international startup ecosystem and became a leading location for venture capital funded firms in the European Union.

The sector with the highest number of companies registered in Germany is Services with 1,443,708 companies followed by Finance, Insurance, and Real Estate and Construction with 480,593 and 173,167 companies respectively.

The list includes the largest German companies by revenue in 2011:

Rank	Name	Headquarters	Ticker	Revenue (Mil. €)	Profit (Mil. €)	Employees (World)
1.	Volkswagen Group	Wolfsburg	VOWG	159,000	15,800	502,000
2.	E.ON	Essen	EONGn	113,000	−1,900	79,000
3.	Daimler	Stuttgart	DAIGn	107,000	6,000	271,000
4.	Siemens	Berlin, München	SIEGn	74,000	6,300	360,000
5.	BASF	Ludwigshafen am Rhein	BASFn	73,000	6,600	111,000
6.	BMW	München	BMWG	69,000	4,900	100,000
7.	Metro	Düsseldorf	MEOG	67,000	740	288,000
8.	Schwarz Gruppe	Neckarsulm		63,000	N/A	315,000
9.	Deutsche Telekom	Bonn	DTEGn	59,000	670	235,000
10.	Deutsche Post	Bonn	DPWGn	53,000	1,300	471,000
—	Bosch	Gerlingen		73,100	2,300	390,000
—	Uniper	Düsseldorf	UNSE01	67,300		13,000
—	Allianz	München	ALVG	104,000	2,800	141,000
—	Deutsche Bank	Frankfurt am Main	DBKGn		4,300	101,000

=== Mergers and acquisitions ===
Since German reunification, there have been 52,258 mergers or acquisitions deals inbound or outbound in Germany. The most active year in terms of value was 1999 with a total value of 48 billion euro, twice as much as the runner up which was 2006 with 24 billion euro.

Here is a list of the top 10 deals (ranked by value) that include a German company. The Vodafone–Mannesmann deal is still the biggest deal in global history.

Rank	Date	Acquirer	Acquirer Nation	Target	Target Nation	Value (bil. USD)
1	14 Nov 1999	Vodafone AirTouch PLC	United Kingdom	Mannesmann AG	Germany	202.79
2	18 May 2016	Bayer AG	Germany	Monsanto Co	United States	56.60
3	6 May 1998	Daimler-Benz AG	Germany	Chrysler Corp	United States	40.47
4	16 Aug 2016	Linde AG	Germany	Praxair Inc	United States	35.16
5	21 Oct 1999	Mannesmann AG	Germany	Orange PLC	United Kingdom	32.59
6	24 Jul 2000	Deutsche Telekom AG	Germany	VoiceStream Wireless Corp	United States	29.40
7	17 May 1999	Rhone-Poulenc SA	France	Hoechst AG	Germany	21.92
8	23 Mar 2006	Bayer AG	Germany	Schering AG	Germany	21.40
9	01 Apr 2001	Allianz AG	Germany	Dresdner Bank AG	Germany	19.66
10	30 May 2005	Unicredito Italiano SpA	Italy	Bayerische Hypo- und Vereins	Germany	18.26

== Economic region ==
Germany is part of a monetary union, the eurozone (dark blue), and of the EU single market.

Germany as a federation is a polycentric country and does not have a single economic centre. The stock exchange is located in Frankfurt am Main, the largest Media company (Bertelsmann SE & Co. KGaA) is headquartered in Gütersloh; the largest car manufacturers are in Wolfsburg (Volkswagen), Stuttgart (Mercedes-Benz and Porsche), and Munich (Audi and BMW).

Germany is an advocate of closer European economic and political integration. Its commercial policies are increasingly determined by agreements among European Union (EU) members and EU single market legislation. Germany introduced the common European currency, the euro on 1 January 1999. Its monetary policy is set by the European Central Bank in Frankfurt.

The southern states ("Bundesländer"), especially Bayern, Baden-Württemberg, and Hessen, are economically stronger than the northern states. One of Germany's traditionally strongest (and at the same time oldest) economic regions is the Ruhr area in the west, between Duisburg and Dortmund. 27 of the country's 100 largest companies are located there. In recent years, however, the area, whose economy is based on natural resources and heavy industry, has seen a substantial rise in unemployment (2010: 8.7%).

The economy of Bayern and Baden-Württemberg, the states with the lowest number of unemployed people (2018: 2.7%, 3.1%), on the other hand, is based on high-value products. Important sectors are automobiles, electronics, aerospace, and biomedicine, among others. Baden-Württemberg is an industrial centre especially for the automobile and machine-building industry and the home of brands like Mercedes-Benz (Daimler), Porsche and Bosch.

With the reunification on 3 October 1990, Germany began the major task of reconciling the economic systems of the two former republics. Interventionist economic planning ensured gradual development in eastern Germany up to the level of former West Germany, but the standard of living and annual income remains significantly higher in western German states. The modernisation and integration of the eastern German economy continues to be a long-term process scheduled to last until the year 2019, with annual transfers from west to east amounting to roughly $80 billion. The overall unemployment rate has consistently fallen since 2005 and reached a 20-year low in 2012. The country in July 2014 began legislating to introduce a federally mandated minimum wage which would come into effect on 1 January 2015.

On 25 May 2023, a declaration of a recession in the German economy was made. It was reported that Gross Domestic Product (GDP) had contracted by 0.3% between January and March. This contraction was largely due to increased prices which discouraged consumer spending. The statistics office in Germany reported that household spending had dropped by 1.2% in the first quarter of the year.

=== German states ===
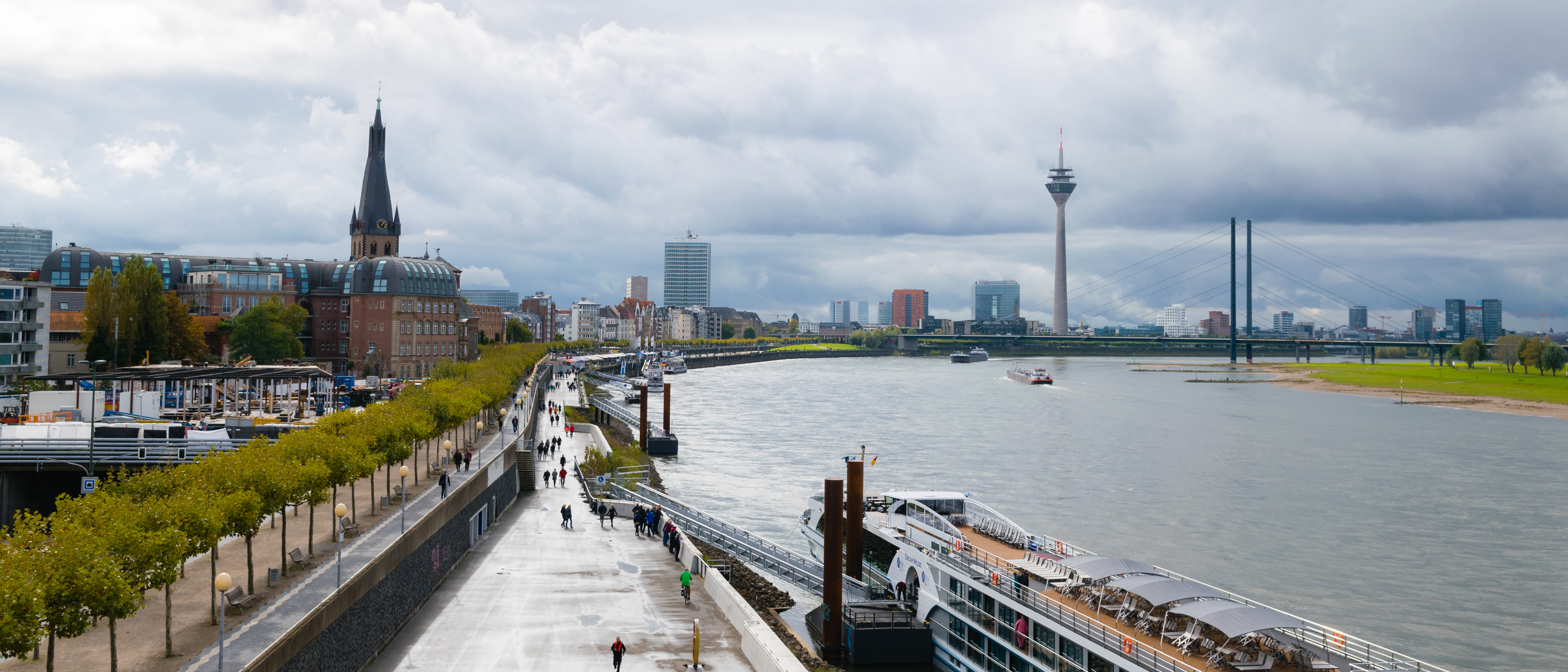
Rhine-Ruhr metropolitan region in North Rhine-Westphalia has the second largest GDP in the European Union (€536 billion). Four of the EU's 5 biggest metropolitan regions by GDP are in Germany.

List of German states by GRP in 2022
States	Rank	GRP (in billions EUR€)	Share of GDP (%)
Germany	—	3,867.050	100
North Rhine-Westphalia	1	793.790	20.5
Bavaria	2	716.784	18.5
Baden-Württemberg	3	572.837	14.8
Lower Saxony	4	339.414	8.8
Hesse	5	323.352	8.4
Berlin	6	179.379	4.6
Rhineland-Palatinate	7	171.699	4.4
Saxony	8	146.511	3.8
Hamburg	9	144.220	3.7
Schleswig-Holstein	10	112.755	2.9
Brandenburg	11	88.800	2.3
Saxony-Anhalt	13	75.436	2.0
Thuringia	12	71.430	1.8
Mecklenburg-Vorpommern	14	53.440	1.4
Bremen	16	38.698	1.0
Saarland	15	38.505	1.0

=== Wealth ===
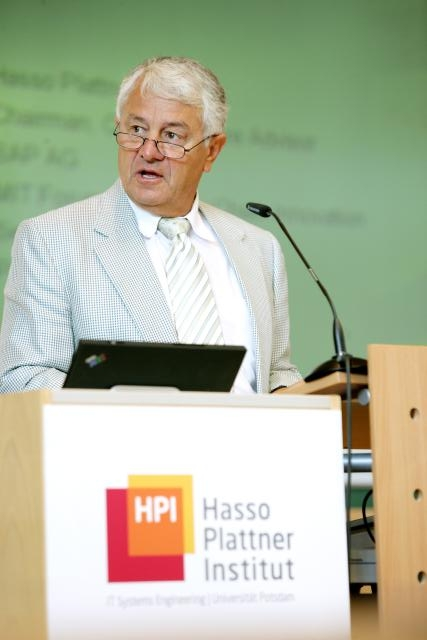
Hasso Plattner

The following top 10 list of German billionaires is based on an annual assessment of wealth and assets compiled and published by Forbes magazine on 1 March 2016.

Wealth (in billions)	Name(s) of billionaire(s)
27.9	Albrecht family
20.3	Theo Albrecht Jr.
18.5	Susanne Klatten
18.1	Georg F. W. Schaeffler
16.4	Dieter Schwarz
15.6	Stefan Quandt
15.4	Michael Otto
11.7	Heinz Hermann Thiele
10	Klaus-Michael Kühne
9.5	Hasso Plattner

Wolfsburg is the city in Germany with the country's highest per capita GDP, at $128,000. The following top 10 list of German cities with the highest per capita GDP is based on a study by the Cologne Institute for Economic Research on 31 July 2013.

GDP	City
$128,000	Wolfsburg, Lower Saxony
$114,281	Frankfurt am Main, Hesse
$108,347	Schweinfurt, Bavaria
$104,000	Ingolstadt, Bavaria
$99,389	Regensburg, Bavaria
$92,525	Düsseldorf, North Rhine-Westphalia
$92,464	Ludwigshafen am Rhein, Rhineland-Palatinate
$91,630	Erlangen, Bavaria
$91,121	Stuttgart, Baden-Württemberg
$88,692	Ulm, Baden-Württemberg

== Sectors ==
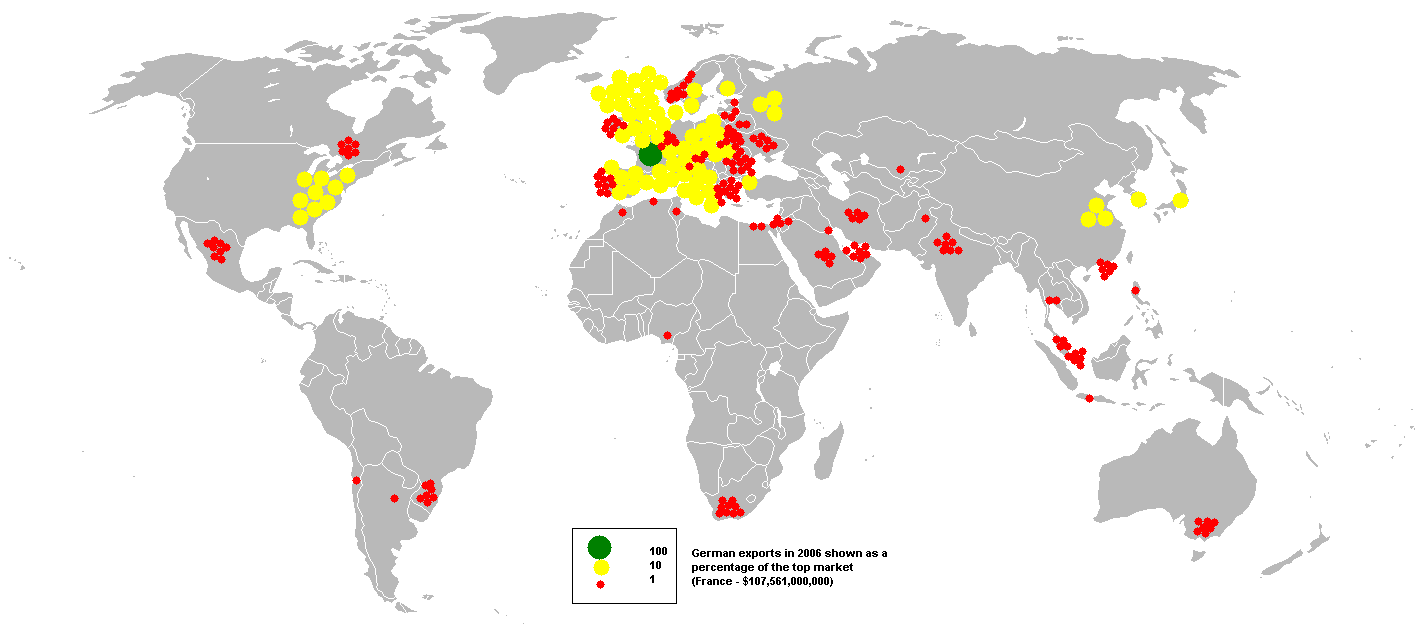
German exports in 2006

Germany has a social market economy characterised by a highly qualified labour force, a developed infrastructure, a large capital stock, a low level of corruption, and a high level of innovation. It has the largest national economy in Europe, the third-largest by nominal GDP in the world, and ranked fifth by GDP (PPP) in 2023.

The service sector contributes around 70% of the total GDP, industry 29.1%, and agriculture 0.9%.

=== Primary ===
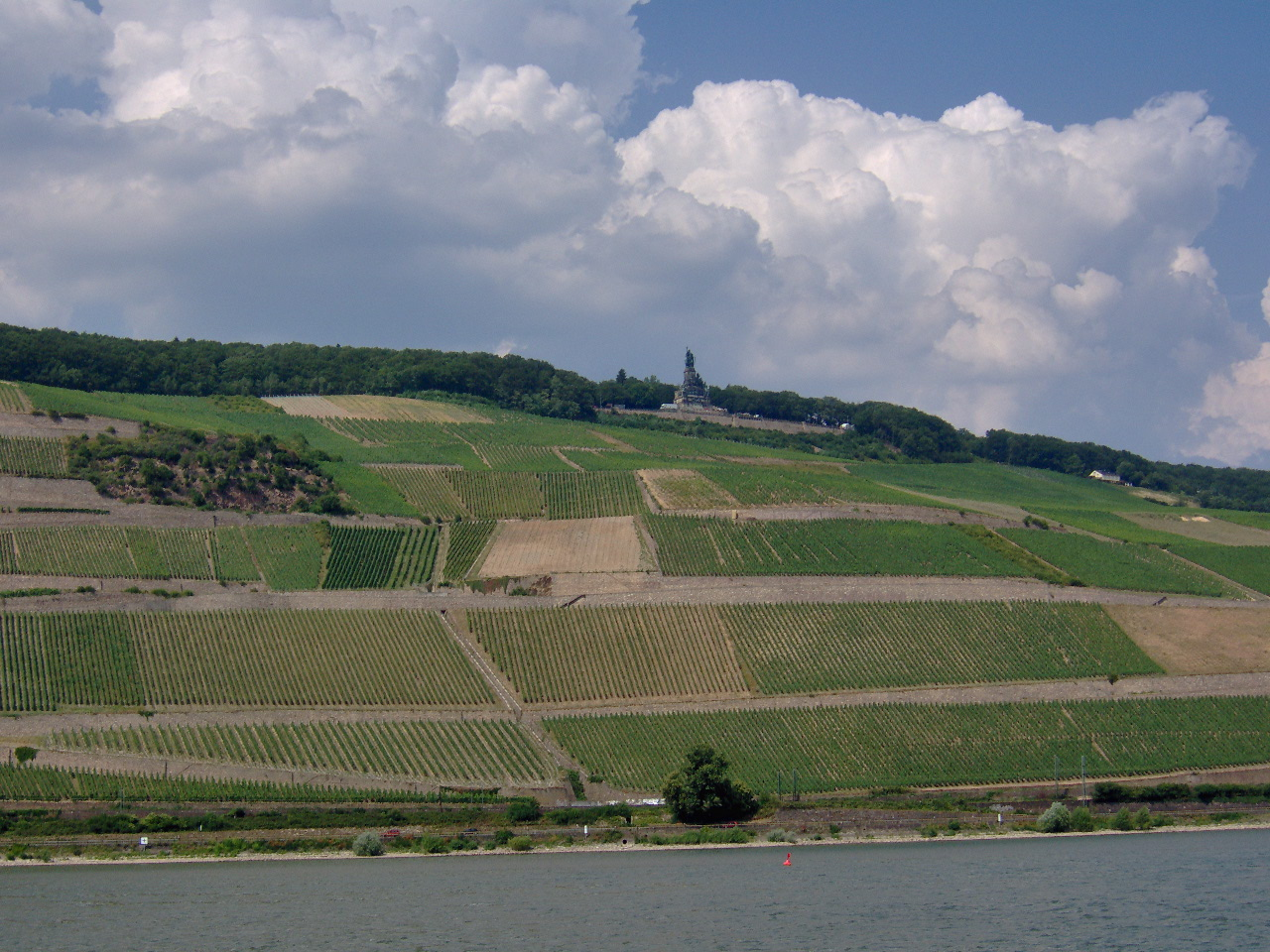
German wine region Rheingau. Germany is the EU's second-largest agriculture goods exporter and the fourth-largest worldwide.

In 2010 agriculture, forestry, and mining accounted for only 0.9% of Germany's gross domestic product (GDP) and employed only 2.4% of the population, down from 4% in 1991.

==== Agriculture and forestry ====
Agriculture is extremely productive, and Germany can cover 90% of its nutritional needs with domestic production. Germany is the third-largest agricultural producer in the European Union after France and Italy. Germany's principal agricultural products are potatoes, wheat, barley, sugar beets, fruit, and cabbages.

Despite the country's high level of industrialisation, almost one-third of its territory is covered by forest. The forestry industry provides for about two-thirds of domestic consumption of wood and wood products, so Germany is a net importer of these items.

==== Mining ====
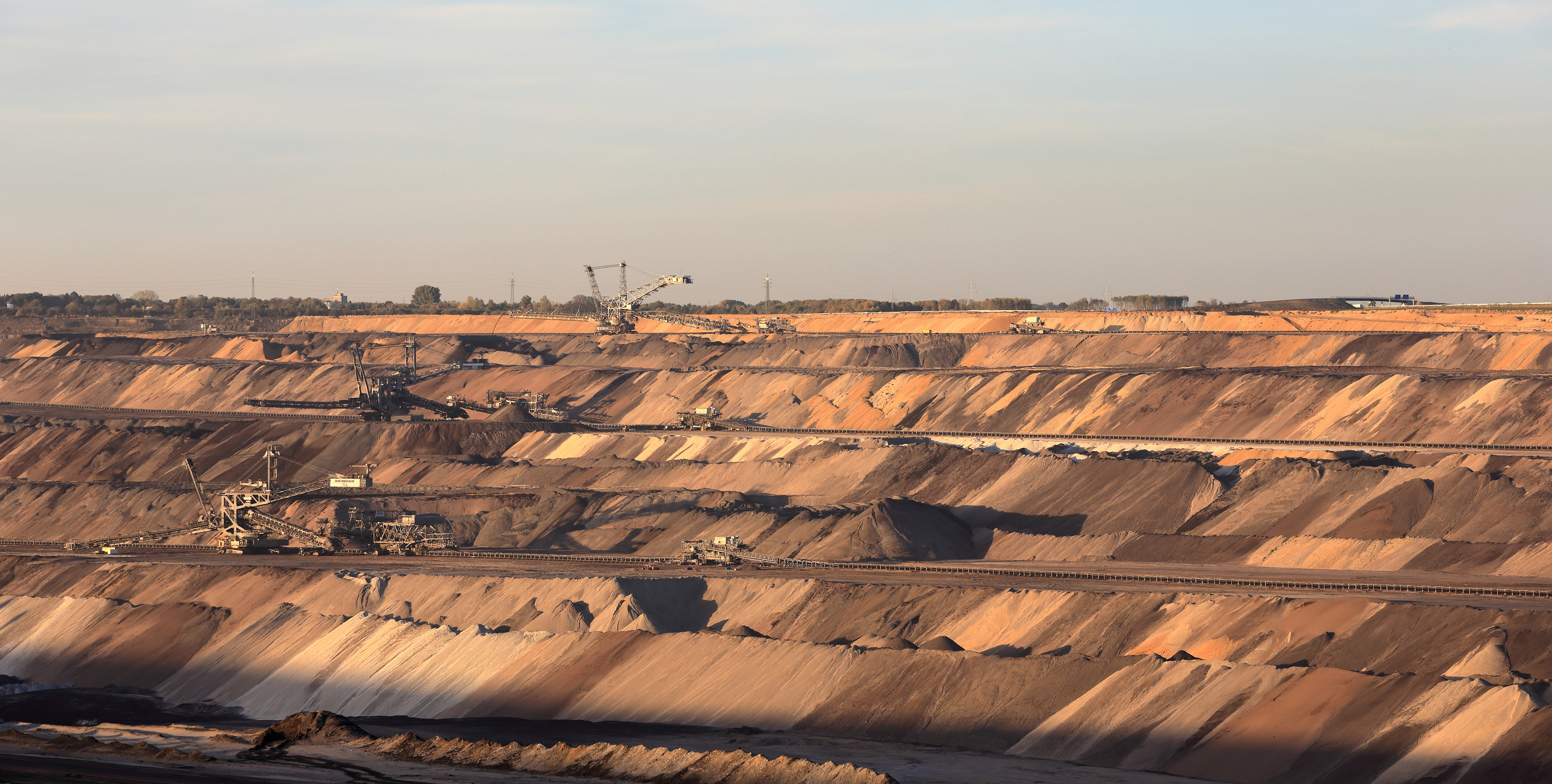
Strip mining lignite at Tagebau Garzweiler near Grevenbroich, Germany

The German soil is relatively poor in raw materials. Only lignite (brown coal) and potash salt (Kalisalz) are available in significant quantities. However, the former GDR's Wismut mining company produced a total of 230,400 tonnes of uranium between 1947 and 1990 and made East Germany the fourth-largest producer of uranium ore worldwide (largest in USSR's sphere of control) at the time. Oil, natural gas, and other resources are, for the most part, imported from other countries.

Potash salt is mined in the centre of the country (Niedersachsen, Sachsen-Anhalt, and Thüringen). The most important producer is K+S (formerly Kali und Salz AG).

Germany's bituminous coal deposits were created more than 300 million years ago from swamps which extended from the present-day South England, over the Ruhr area to Poland. Lignite deposits developed similarly, but during a later period, about 66 million years ago. Because the wood is not yet completely transformed into coal, brown coal contains less energy than bituminous coal.

Lignite is extracted in the extreme western and eastern parts of the country, mainly in Nordrhein-Westfalen, Sachsen, and Brandenburg. Considerable amounts are burned in coal plants near the mining areas, to produce electricity. Transporting lignite over far distances is not economically feasible, therefore the plants are located practically next to the extraction sites. Bituminous coal is mined in Nordrhein-Westfalen and Saarland. Most power plants burning bituminous coal operate on imported material, therefore the plants are located not only near to the mining sites, but throughout the country.

In 2019, the country was the world's 3rd largest producer of selenium, the world's 5th largest producer of potash, the world's 5th largest producer of boron, the world's 7th largest producer of lime, the world's 13th largest producer of fluorspar, the world's 14th largest producer of feldspar, the world's 17th largest producer of graphite, the world's 18th largest producer of sulfur, in addition to being the 4th largest world producer of salt.

=== Industry ===
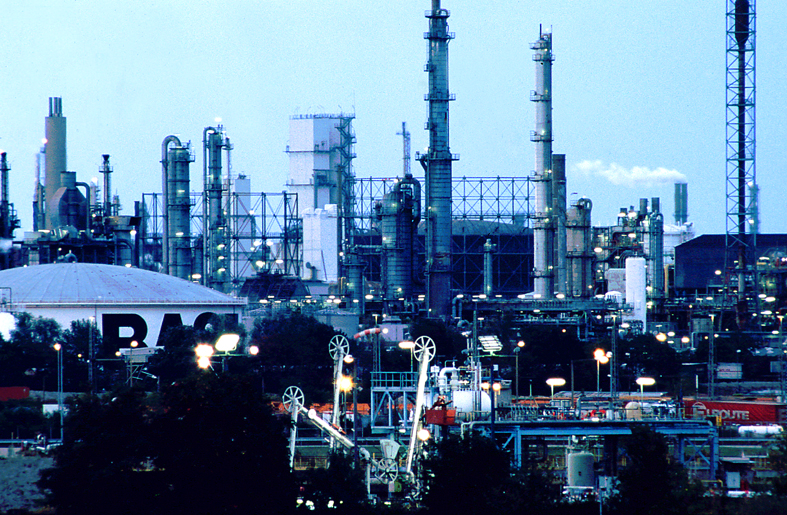
The world's largest coherent chemistry plant BASF in Ludwigshafen

Industry and construction accounted for 30.7% of the gross domestic product in 2017 and employed 24.2% of the workforce. Germany excels in the production of automobiles, machinery, electrical equipment, and chemicals. With the manufacture of 5.2 million vehicles in 2009, Germany was the world's fourth-largest producer and largest exporter of automobiles. German automotive companies enjoy an extremely strong position in the so-called premium segment, with a combined world market share of about 90%. All new automobiles sold in Germany must be zero-emission vehicles from 2035.

Small- to medium-sized manufacturing firms (Mittelstand companies) which specialise in technologically advanced niche products and are often family-owned form a major part of the German economy. It is estimated that about 1,500 German companies occupy a top three position in their respective market segment worldwide. In about two thirds of all industry sectors German companies belong to the top three competitors.

Germany is the only country among the top five arms exporters that is not a permanent member of the United Nations Security Council.

=== Services ===
==== Banking and finance ====
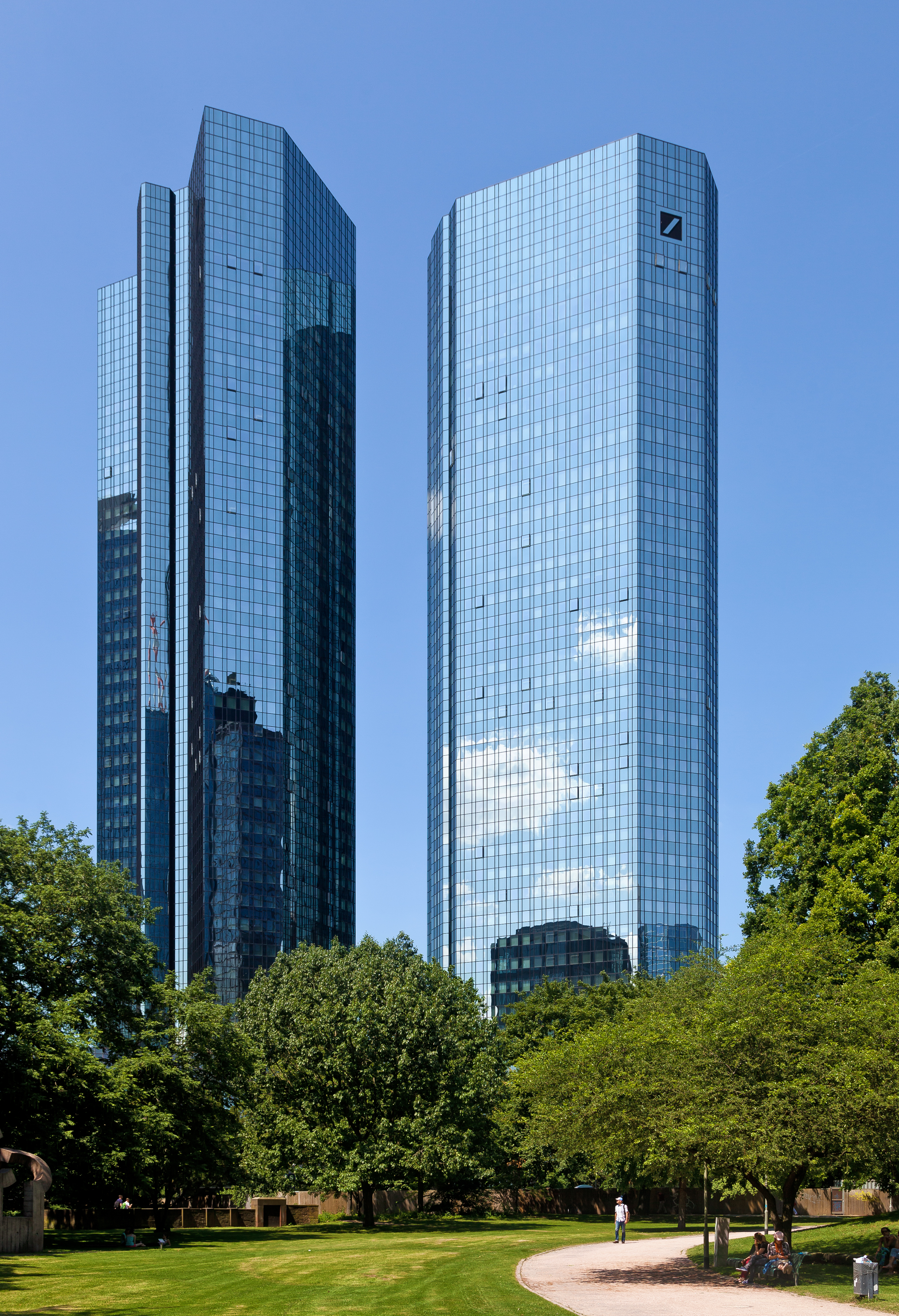
Deutsche Bank Twin Towers in Frankfurt

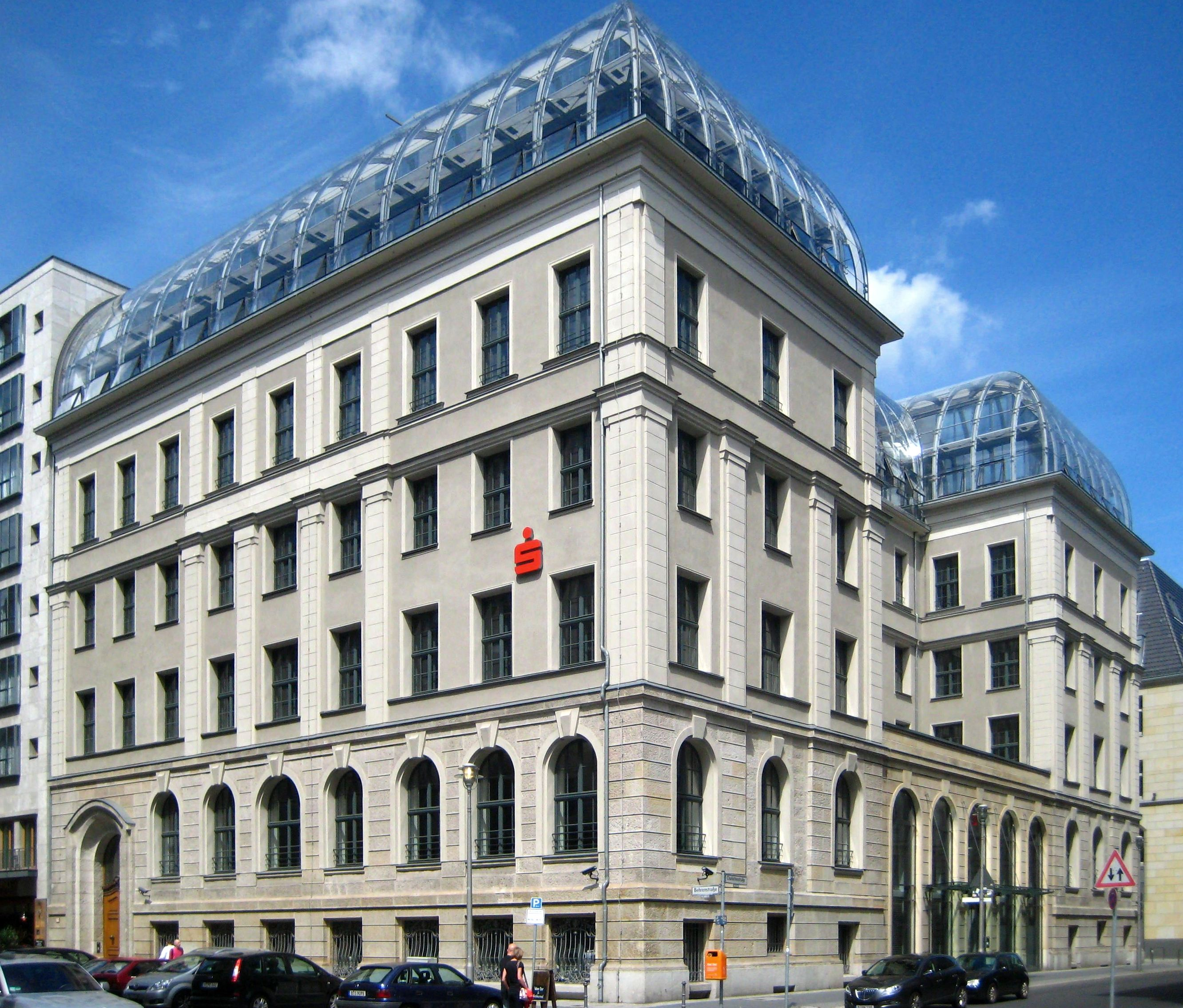
Deutscher Sparkassen- und Giroverband headquarters in Berlin

Seven German banks are among the biggest in the world. As of 2019, Germany is the country in Europe with the highest number of credit institutions: between 1,600 and 1,800. The types of institutions are in strong competition with each other: 390 Sparkassen and 8 public Landesbanken groups (1,200 billion euros of deposits), private commercial banks (Deutsche Bank, Commerzbank, and Unicredit-HypoVereinsbank, for 780 billion), cooperative credit banks (700 billion euros), savings banks, and Raiffeisen. The total of the system is worth 3,800 billion. 75% of retail customer deposits are managed by savings banks and cooperative credit banks. Deutsche Bank and the Sparkassen-Finanzgruppe are among the biggest financial services groups worldwide.

According to Eurostat, in 2022 Germany also recorded the highest European rate of gross savings (19.9% of disposable income).

==== Education ====
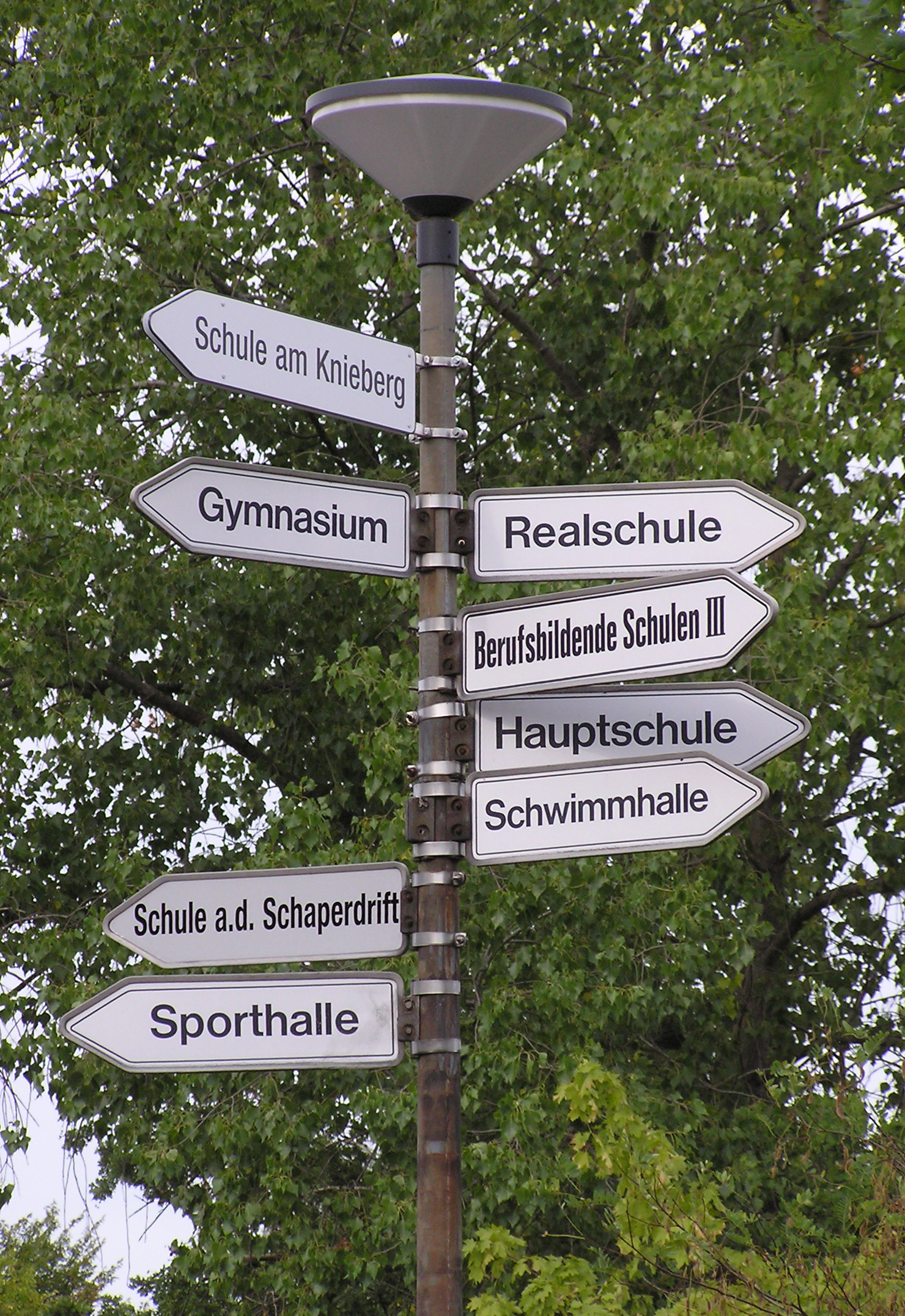
Sign of different coexisting school types on a school complex in Germany

Education in Germany is primarily the responsibility of individual states (Länder), with the federal government only playing a minor role.

While kindergarten (nursery school) is optional, formal education is compulsory for all children from the age of 6–7. Details vary from state to state. For example, in Bavaria, children need to attend school for a total of 12 years (of which 3 may be for an apprenticeship); while in Brandenburg, school must be attended until the end of the school year in which the pupil turns 18. Students can complete three types of school leaving qualifications, ranging from the more vocational Hauptschulabschluss and Mittlere Reife over to the more academic Abitur. The latter permits students to apply to study at university level. A bachelor's degree is commonly followed up with a master's degree, with 45% of all undergraduates proceeding to postgraduate studies within 1.5 years of graduating. While rules vary (see § Tuition fees) from state to state, German public universities generally do not charge tuition fees.

Germany is well-known internationally for its vocational training model, the Ausbildung (apprenticeship), with about 50 per cent of all school leavers entering vocational training.

==== Fashion ====
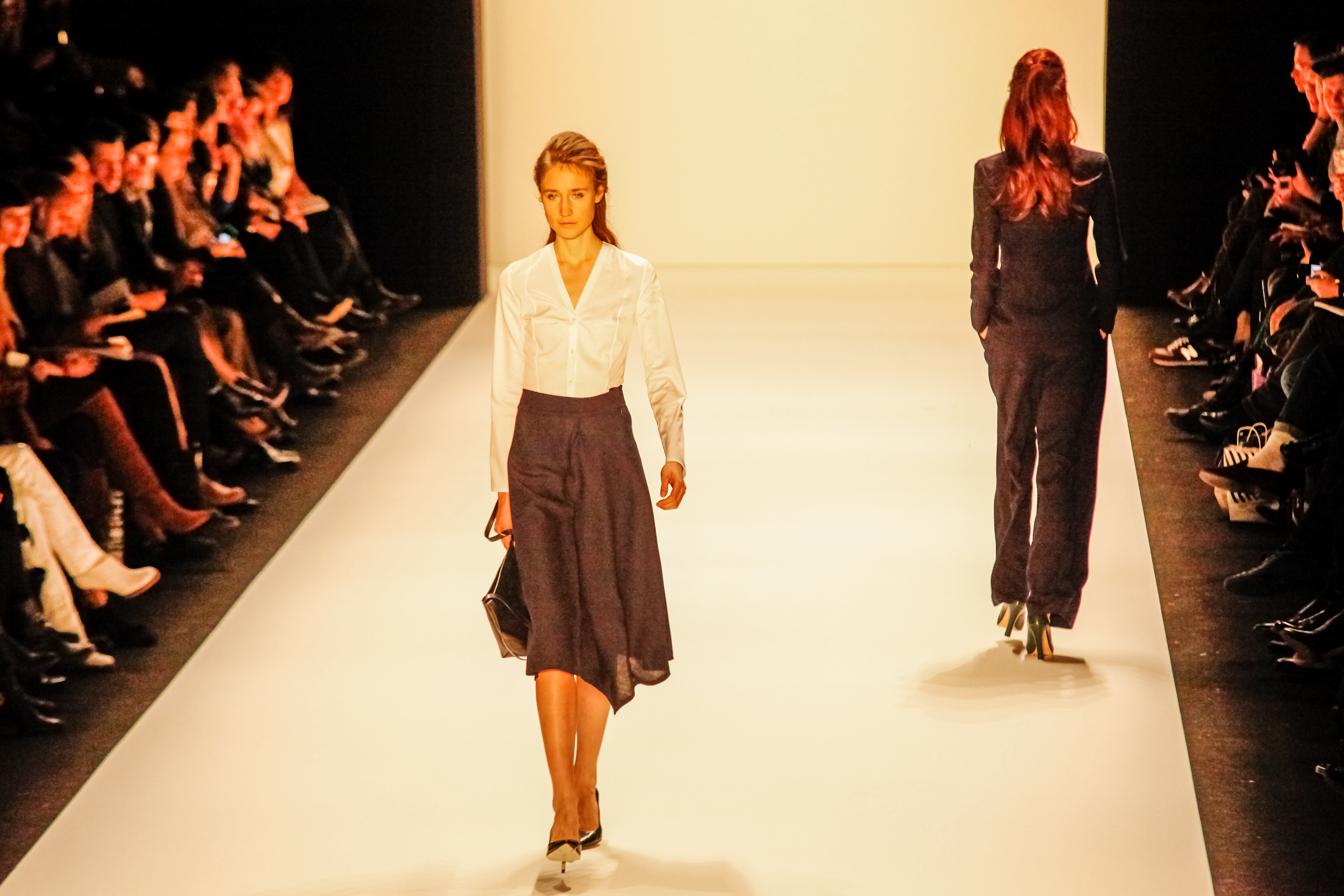
Berlin Fashion Week

German fashion is known for its emerging designers and manufacturers of sports and outdoor clothing, ready-to-wear and custom-made creations.

Berlin, the country's capital city, is also a fashion capital of the world and the home of Berlin Fashion Week, the country's main event where young and creative German fashion designers showcase unique creations. Other important cities to the German fashion landscape are Munich, Hamburg and Cologne. Smaller places such as Herford, Metzingen, Herzogenaurach, Schorndorf, Chemnitz, Albstadt and Detmold are also important design and production hubs of the German fashion industry.

==== Healthcare ====
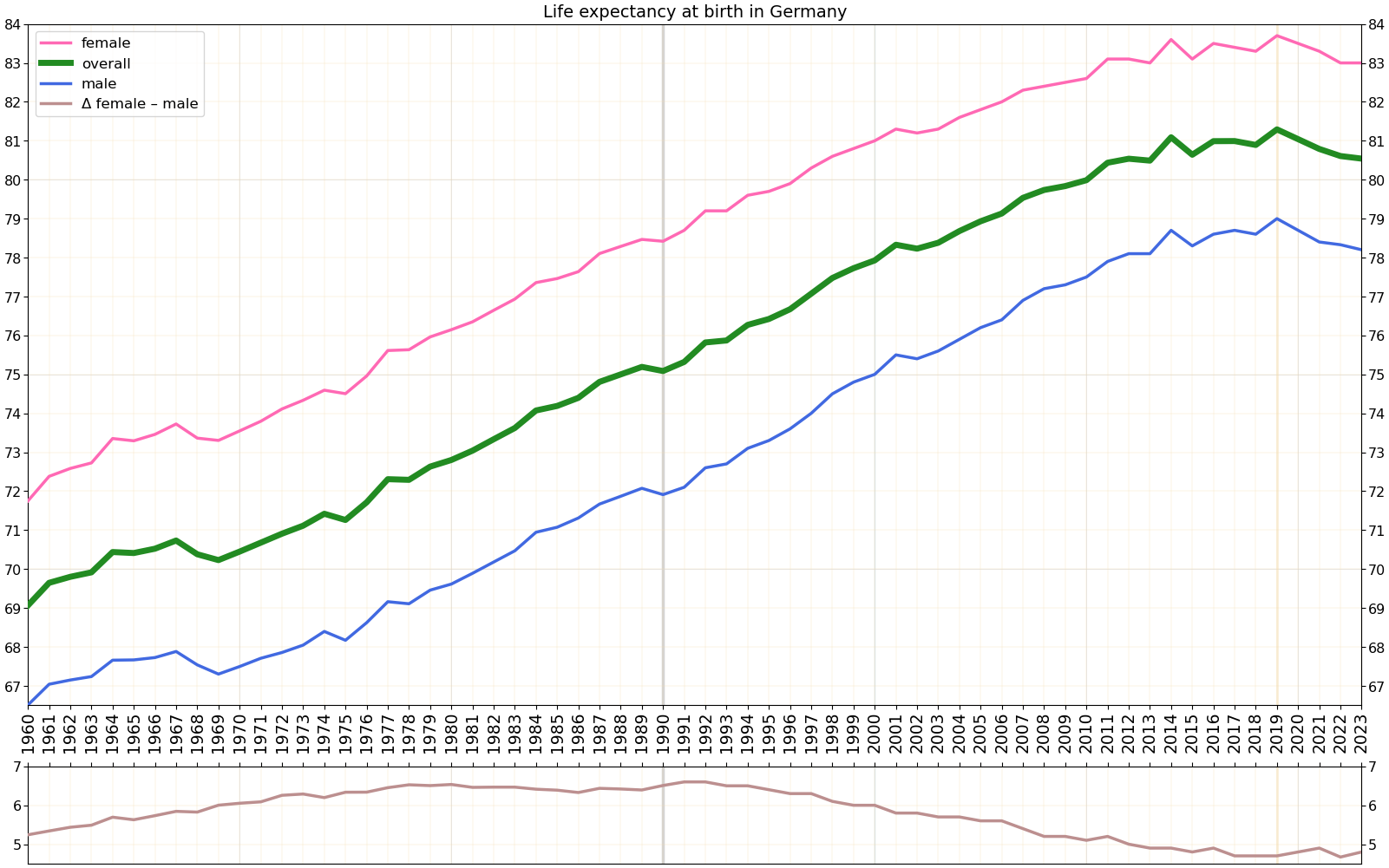
Development of life expectancy in Germany by sex

Germany has a universal multi-payer health care system. It is financed through a combination of statutory health insurance (Gesetzliche Krankenversicherung) and private health insurance (Private Krankenversicherung).

Germany pioneered social health insurance in 1883. The first law covered certain groups of workers and raised national coverage to about 5–10 percent of the population.

In 2010 the health sector’s turnover was about US$369 billion (€287 billion), equal to 11.6 percent of gross domestic product (GDP) and about US$4,500 (€3,510) per capita. According to the World Health Organization, the system was 77% government-funded and 23% privately funded in 2004. Total health spending in 2001 was 10.8 percent of GDP.

Germany’s health outcomes are generally high. In 2004 male life expectancy was 78 years, ranking 30th worldwide. Physician density reached 4.5 per 1,000 inhabitants in 2021, up from 4.4 in 2019. Infant mortality was 4.7 per 1,000 live births. (Note: Infant mortality definitions differ by country. For example, the United States includes infants under 500 g, while Germany does not. Social factors also influence outcomes.)

The Euro Health Consumer Index ranked Germany seventh in 2015, describing it as one of the most consumer-oriented healthcare systems in Europe, with patients able to access almost any type of care without major restrictions.

==== Real estate and housing ====
Home ownership in Germany is lower overall than in most other European countries. In 2022, Germany's homeownership rate was 46.7%. During World War II, 2.25 million homes were destroyed with another two million damaged, reducing overall housing stocks by 20%. In 1949, West Germany enacted its first housing law and by 1961 had reduced its housing shortage from 5.5 million units to only 658,000. The mortgage market remained weak with banks requiring large downpayments from borrowers.

Germany has comparatively low rental prices and a high proportion of rent controlled units. The German government does not deduct mortgage interest payments from taxes. In the 2000s, Germany reduced government subsidies for homeownership.

==== Telecommunications ====
Telecommunications in Germany is highly developed. The German telecommunication market has been fully liberalized since January 1, 1998. Germany is served by an extensive system of automatic telephone exchanges connected by modern networks of fiber-optic cable, coaxial cable, microwave radio relay, and a domestic satellite system; cellular telephone service is widely available, expanding rapidly, and includes roaming service to foreign countries. As a result of intensive capital expenditures since reunification, the formerly antiquated system of the eastern part of the country has been rapidly modernized to the most advanced technology. Deutsche Telekom began rolling out FTTH networks in ten cities in 2011, following the launch of pilot projects in Hennigsdorf, Braunschweig and Dresden in 2010.

==== Tourism ====
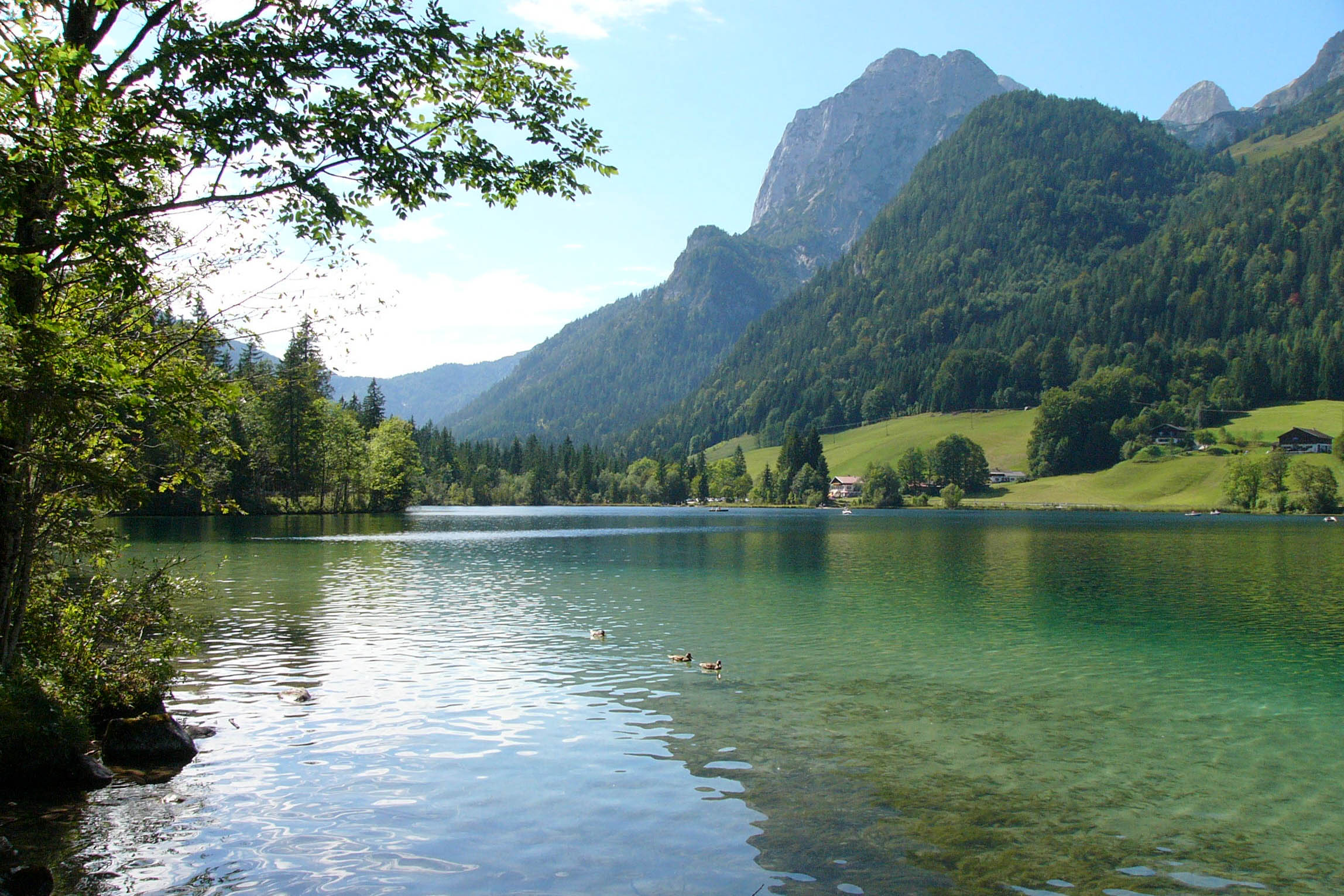
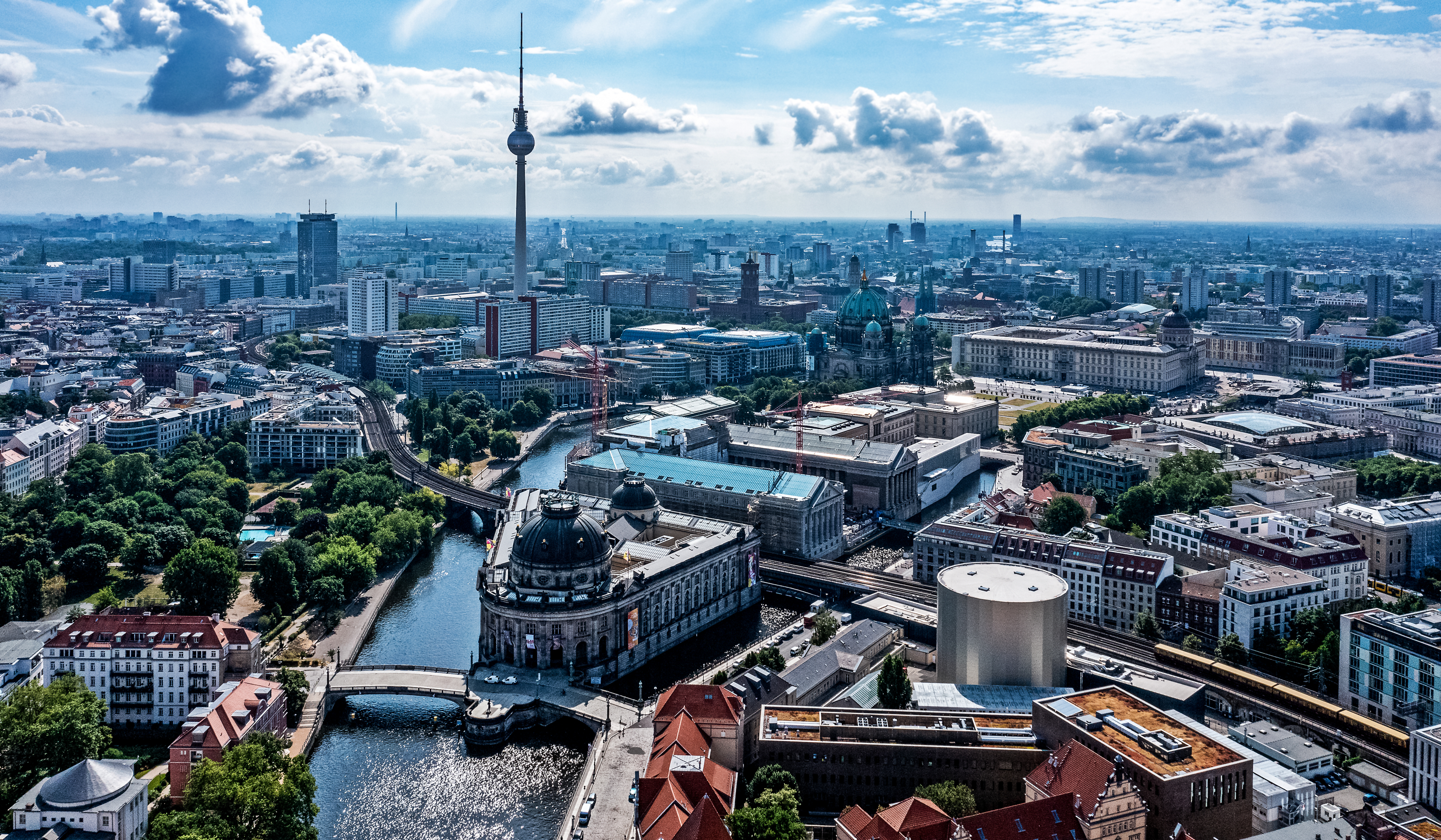
Bavaria (l.) is a tourism destination while Berlin (r.) is a centre of creative industries, research, and education.

In 2017 services constituted 68.6% of gross domestic product (GDP), and the sector employed 74.3% of the workforce. The subcomponents of services are financial, renting, and business activities (30.5%); trade, hotels and restaurants, and transport (18%); and other service activities (21.7%).

Germany is the seventh most visited country in the world, with a total of 407 million overnights during 2012. This number includes 68.83 million nights by foreign visitors. In 2012, over 30.4 million international tourists arrived in Germany. Berlin has become the third most visited city destination in Europe. Additionally, more than 30% of Germans spend their holiday in their own country, with the biggest share going to Mecklenburg-Vorpommern. Domestic and international travel and tourism combined directly contribute over EUR43.2 billion to German GDP. Including indirect and induced impacts, the industry contributes 4.5% of German GDP and supports 2 million jobs (4.8% of total employment). The largest annual international trade fairs and congresses are held in several German cities such as Hannover, Frankfurt, and Berlin.

== Government finances ==
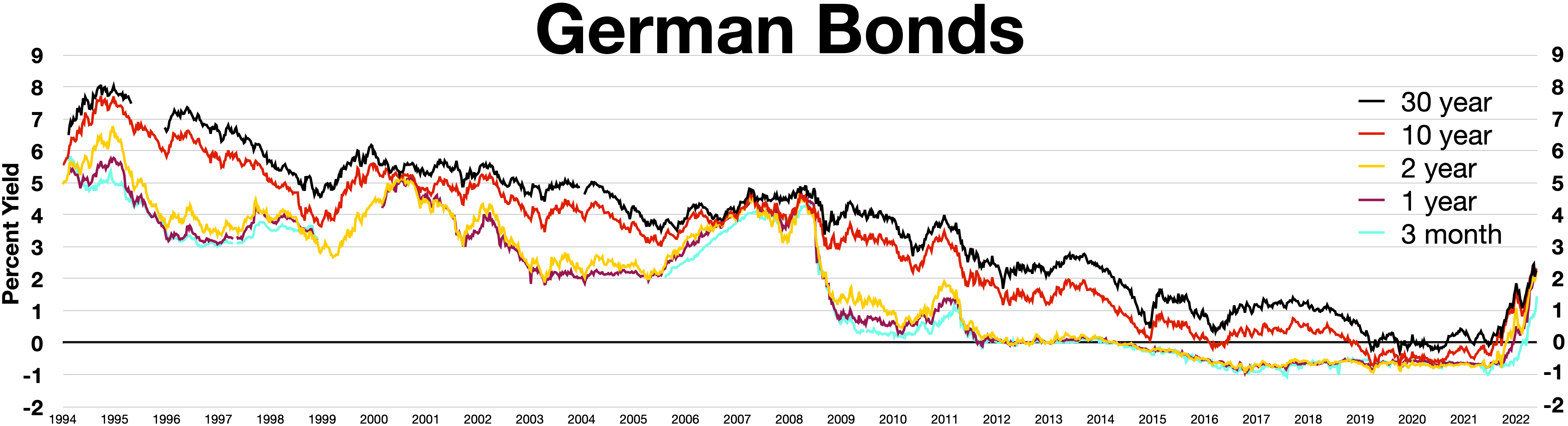
German bonds Inverted yield curve in 2008 and Negative interest rates 2014–2022 30 year 10 year 2 year 1 year 3 month

The debt-to-GDP ratio of Germany had its peak in 2010 when it stood at 80.3% and decreased since then. According to Eurostat, the government gross debt of Germany amounts to €2,152.0 billion or 71.9% of its GDP in 2015. The federal government achieved a budget surplus of €12.1 billion ($13.1 billion) in 2015. Germany's credit rating by credit rating agencies Standard & Poor's, Moody's, and Fitch Ratings stands at the highest possible rating AAA with a stable outlook in 2016.

Germany's "debt clock" (Schuldenuhr) reversed for the first time in 20 years in January 2018. It is now currently increasing at 10,424.00 per second (October 2020).

Economists generally see Germany's current account surplus as undesirable.

=== Welfare spending ===
Social security in Germany is a system of social insurance and public benefits that provides financial protection against risks such as illness, unemployment, old age, long-term care needs and workplace accidents. It also includes support for families, people with disabilities and people who cannot adequately support themselves.

The core of the system is statutory social insurance, which covers health insurance, long-term care insurance, pension insurance, unemployment insurance and accident insurance. Other forms of social protection include social assistance, housing benefits, family benefits, rehabilitation and social compensation. Much of the system is governed by the Sozialgesetzbuch (SGB; Social Code), which sets out the main legal framework for social benefits and social insurance in Germany.

== Trade and investments ==
Exports of Germany by product category (2019) Chemical products Transportation Machines Mineral products Plastics and rubbers Metals Foodstuffs Precious metals Textiles Instruments Animal products Vegetable products Paper goods Footwear and headwear Miscellaneous Stone and glass Wood products Animal and vegetable bi-products Animal hides Arts and antiques Weapons

In 2025, Germany exported goods worth €1.56 trillion and imported goods worth €1.36 trillion, resulting in a trade surplus of €200.5 billion, down from €242.9 billion in 2024. China was Germany's largest trading partner by total trade, followed by the United States and the Netherlands. The United States remained its largest export destination, while China was its largest source of imports.

The European Union accounts for more than half of Germany's goods exports. France, the Netherlands, Poland and Italy are among its largest export markets. Germany is also closely integrated with Central European manufacturing industries, particularly through trade in machinery, automotive components, electrical equipment and industrial materials.

In 2025, Germany exported approximately €202 billion in goods to the four countries of the Visegrád Group — Poland, the Czech Republic, Hungary and Slovakia— making them collectively a larger export market than any individual country. They accounted for nearly 13% of German merchandise exports, with total bilateral trade reaching approximately €400 billion.

== Infrastructure ==
=== Energy ===
Germany is the world's fifth-largest consumer of energy, and two-thirds of its primary energy was imported in 2002. In the same year, Germany was Europe's largest consumer of electricity, totalling 512.9 terawatt-hours. Government policy promotes energy conservation and the development of renewable energy sources, such as solar, wind, biomass, hydroelectric, and geothermal energy. As a result of energy-saving measures, energy efficiency has been improving since the beginning of the 1970s. The government has set the goal of meeting half the country's energy demands from renewable sources by 2050. Renewable energy also plays an increasing role in the labour market: Almost 700,000 people are employed in the energy sector. About 50 percent of them work with renewable energies.

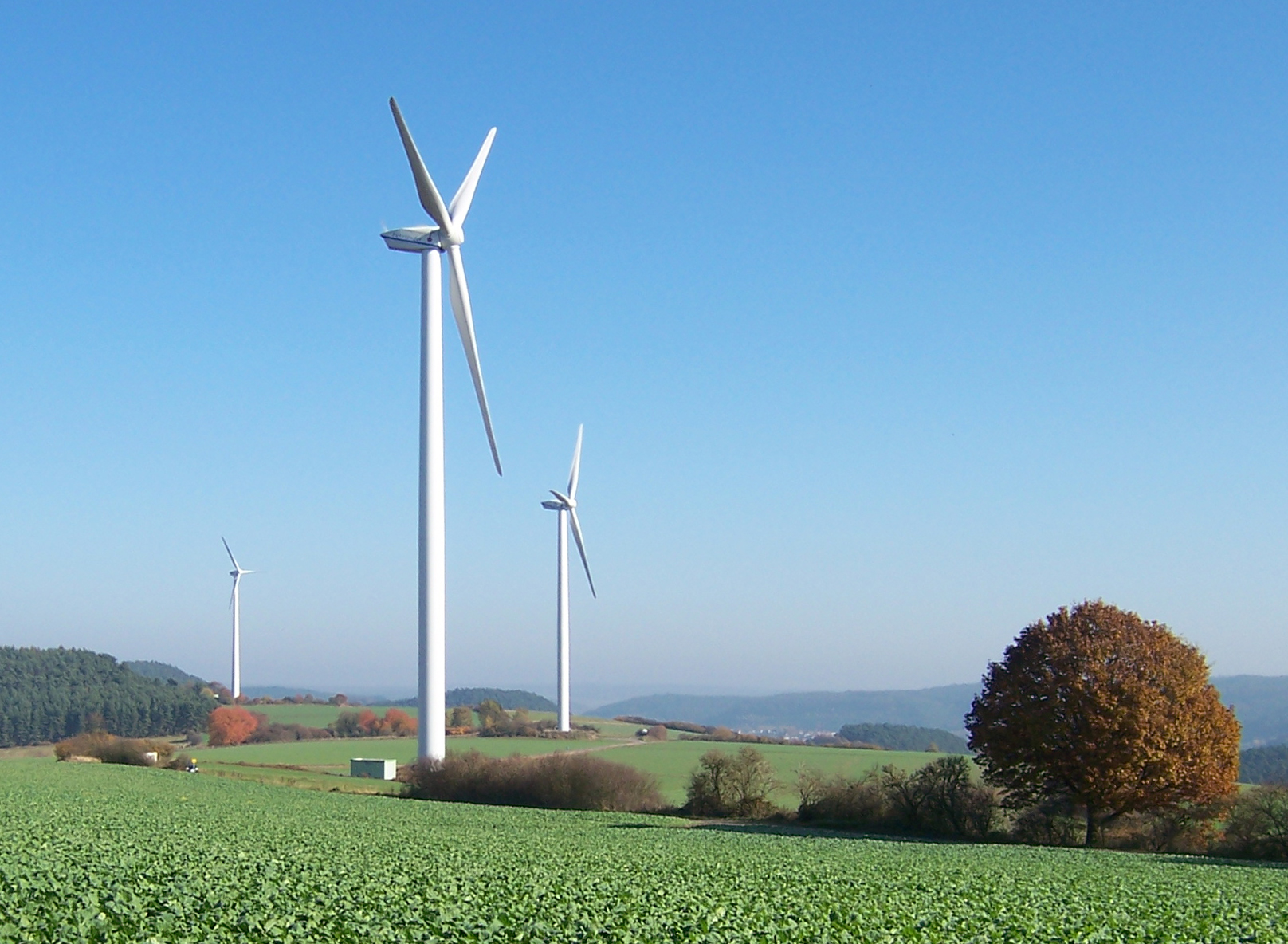
The largest solar power and third-largest wind power capacity in the world is installed in Germany.

In 2000, the red-green coalition under Chancellor Schröder and the German nuclear power industry agreed to phase out all nuclear power plants by 2021. The conservative coalition under Chancellor Merkel reversed this decision in January 2010, electing to keep plants open. The nuclear disaster of the Japanese nuclear plant Fukushima in March 2011 however, changed the political climate fundamentally: Older nuclear plants have been shut down. Germany is seeking to have wind, solar, biogas, and other renewable energy sources play a bigger role, as the country looks to completely phase out nuclear power by 2022 and coal-fired power plants by 2038. Renewable energy yet still plays a more modest role in energy consumption, though German solar and wind power industries play a leading role worldwide. Germany has been called "the world's first major renewable energy economy".

In 2009, Germany's total energy consumption (not just electricity) came from the following sources: oil 34.6%, natural gas 21.7%, lignite 11.4%, bituminous coal 11.1%, nuclear power 11.0%, hydro and wind power 1.5%, others 9.0%.

In the first half of 2021, coal, natural gas, and nuclear energy comprised 56% of the total electricity fed into Germany's grid in the first half of 2021. Coal was the leader out of the conventional energy sources, comprising over 27% of Germany's electricity. Wind power's contribution to the electric grid was 22%.

There are 3 major entry points for oil pipelines: in the northeast (the Druzhba pipeline, coming from Gdańsk), west (coming from Rotterdam) and southeast (coming from Nelahozeves). The oil pipelines of Germany do not constitute a proper network, and sometimes only connect two different locations. Major oil refineries are located in or near the following cities: Schwedt, Spergau, Vohburg, Burghausen, Karlsruhe, Cologne, Gelsenkirchen, Lingen, Wilhelmshaven, Hamburg, and Heide.

Germany's network of natural gas pipelines, on the other hand, is dense and well-connected. Imported pipeline gas comes mostly from Russia, the Netherlands, and the United Kingdom.

=== Transport ===
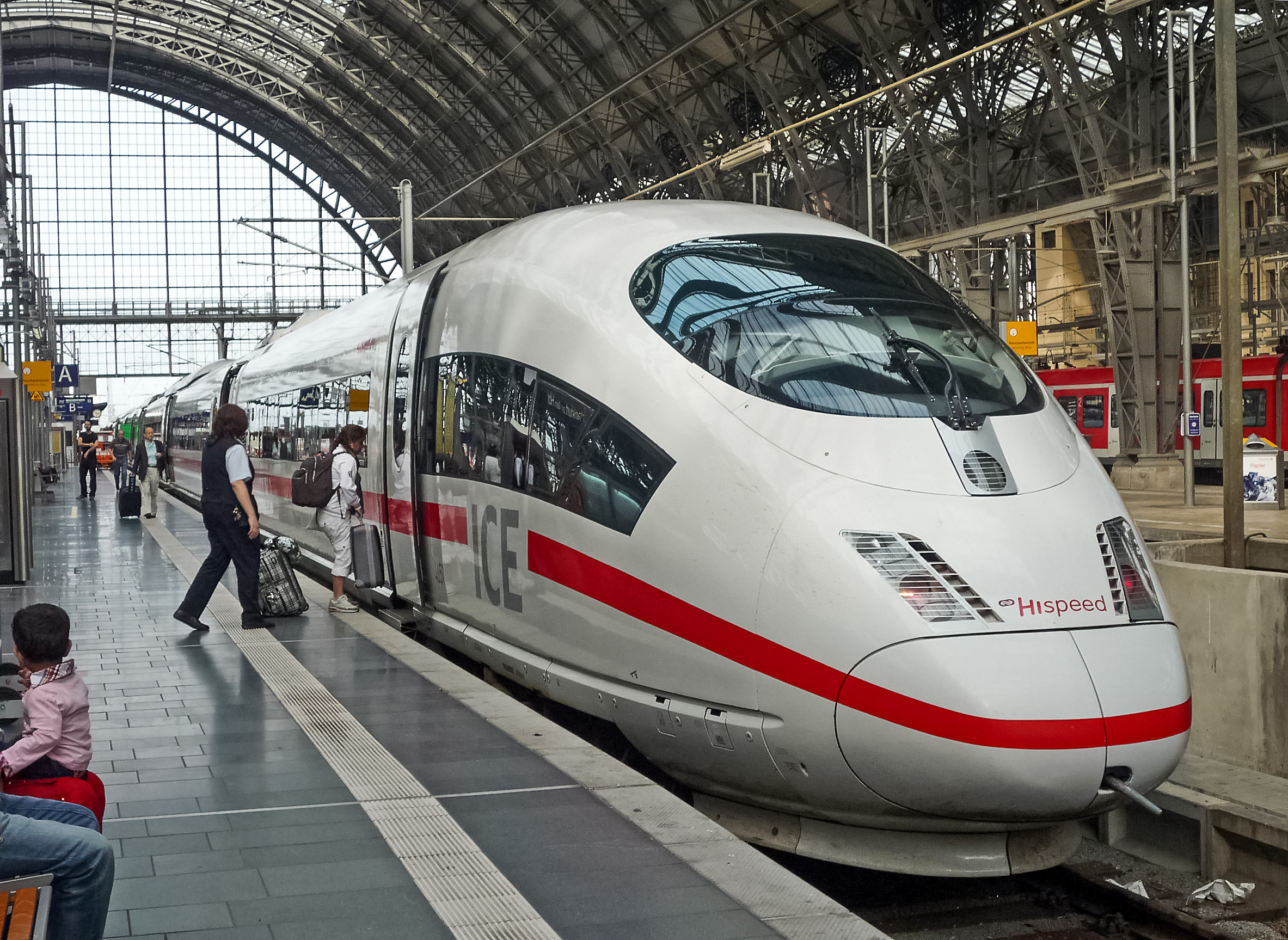
The ICE 3 trainset, here run by Deutsche Bahn, in Frankfurt

With its central position in Europe, Germany is an important transportation hub. This is reflected in its dense and modern transportation networks. The extensive motorway (Autobahn) network ranks worldwide third largest in its total length and features a lack of blanket speed limits on the majority of routes.

Germany has established a polycentric network of high-speed trains. The Intercity Express or ICE is the most advanced service category of the Deutsche Bahn and serves major German cities as well as destinations in neighbouring countries. The train maximum speed varies between 200 km/h and 320 km/h (125-200 mph). Connections are offered at either 30-minute, hourly, or two-hourly intervals. German railways are heavily subsidised, receiving €17.0 billion in 2014.

The largest German airports are Frankfurt Airport and Munich Airport, both are global hubs of Lufthansa. Other major airports are Berlin Brandenburg Airport, Düsseldorf, Hamburg, Hanover, Cologne/Bonn, and Stuttgart.

=== Water supply and sanitation ===
Public water supply and sanitation in Germany is universal and of good quality. Some salient features of the sector compared to other developed countries are its very low per capita water use, the high share of advanced wastewater treatment and very low distribution losses. Responsibility for water supply and sanitation provision lies with municipalities, which are regulated by the states. Professional associations and utility associations play an important role in the sector. As in other EU countries, most of the standards applicable to the sector are set in Brussels (see EU water policy). Recent developments include a trend to create commercial public utilities under private law and an effort to modernize the sector, including through more systematic benchmarking.

== Science and technology ==
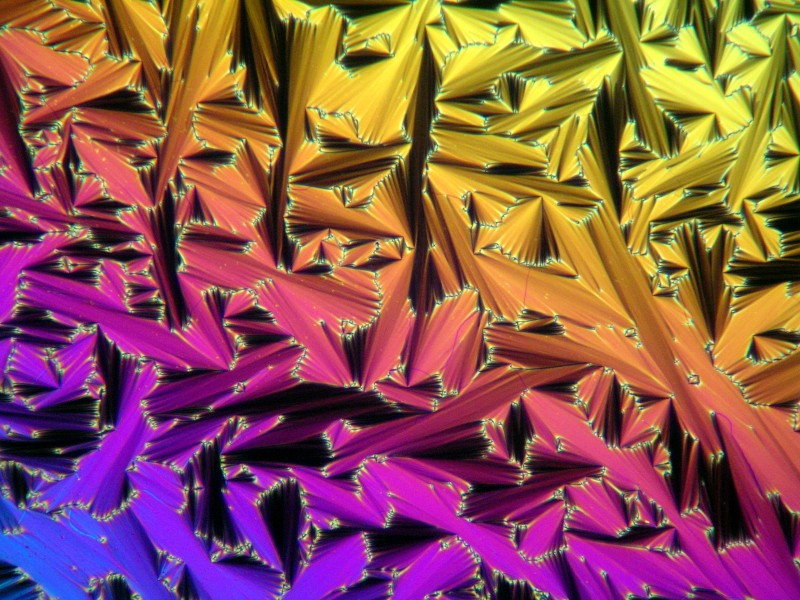
Liquid crystal as visualised by a polarizing microscope. Germany is a pioneer research centre for nanotechnology and materials engineering.

German companies have invested heavily in the development and application of green technologies, with companies specialising in green technology reporting an estimated turnover of €200 billion. The lead markets of Germany's green technology industry are power generation, sustainable mobility, material efficiency, energy efficiency, waste management and recycling, sustainable water management.

Regarding triadic patents, Germany is in third place after the U.S. and Japan. With more than 26,500 registrations for patents submitted to the European Patent Office, Germany is the leading European nation. Siemens, Bosch, and BASF, with almost 5,000 registrations for patents between them in 2008, are among the top 5 of more than 35,000 companies registering patents. Together with the U.S. and Japan, about patents for nano, bio, and new technologies Germany is one of the world's most active nations. With around one-third of triadic patents, Germany leads the way worldwide in the field of vehicle emission reduction.

== Challenges ==
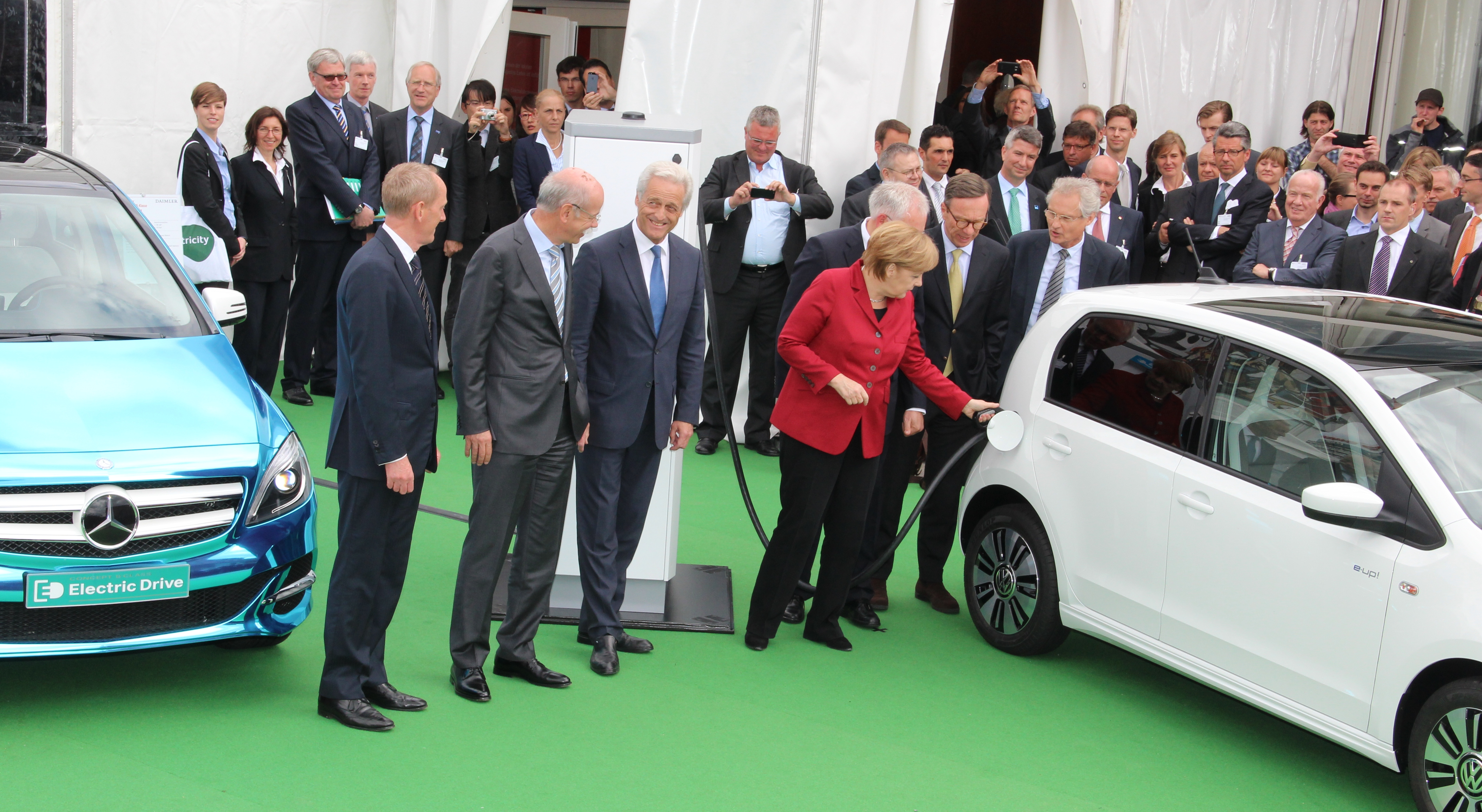
Then-chancellor Angela Merkel at the Electromobility conference in Berlin. All new cars sold in Germany must be zero-emission vehicles from 2035.

Despite economic prosperity, Germany's biggest threat to future economic development is the nation's declining birthrate, which is among the lowest in the world. This is particularly prevalent in parts of society with higher education. As a result, the numbers of workers are expected to decrease and the government spending needed to support pensioners and healthcare will increase if the trend is not reversed.

In the case of compensation law, the Jewish Political Studies Review argues that Germany still holds 80% of the value of assets stolen by the Nazi regime, mainly "financial assets, enterprises, and household items" estimated at more than $115-$175 billion to be restored to their owners.

Less than a quarter of German people expect living conditions to improve in the coming decades.

On August 25, 2020, Federal Statistical Office of Germany revealed that the German economy plunged by 9.7% in the second quarter which is the worst on record. The latest figures show how hard the German economy was hit by the government measures in response to the COVID-19 pandemic.

Energy-intensive German industry and German exporters were hit particularly hard by the 2022 global energy crisis. Economy Minister Robert Habeck warned that the planned end of Russian energy imports will permanently raise energy prices for German industry and consumers.

In the early 21st century, German governments supported the European Green Deal and Germany's transition to green energy. Germany planned to phase out coal by 2030. The last three nuclear power plants in Germany were shut down on 15 April 2023.

Speaking at the COP28 climate summit in Dubai in December 2023, German Chancellor Olaf Scholz called for a phase-out of fossil fuels, including coal, oil and natural gas, and reiterated Germany's commitment to be climate neutral by 2045, saying, "The technologies are there: wind power, photovoltaics, electric motors, green hydrogen."

In April 2025, the German government cut its economic growth forecast for 2025 to zero, citing the impact of US President Donald Trump's trade policies. The United States is Germany’s largest trading partner, and Habeck said Trump’s tariffs were going to hit the German economy harder than other nations because it is so reliant on exports.

=== Social and income inequality ===
Inequality in Germany encompasses disparities in income, wealth, social mobility and educational opportunity, economic outcomes by migration background and ethnicity, regional development between the former East and West, and pay between women and men. By international standards, income inequality is moderate: the Gini coefficient for equivalised disposable income was about 0.30 in 2025, close to the European Union average. Wealth is distributed far more unequally, with a net-wealth Gini of roughly 0.72 to 0.78 depending on the data source, among the highest in the euro area. Both income and wealth inequality rose over the 2000s and 2010s, and a marked gap persists between the territories of the former East Germany and West Germany more than three decades after reunification. Germany also has comparatively low intergenerational mobility and a wide gap in poverty risk between people with and without a migration background.

=== Immigration ===
In October 2023, Economy Minister Robert Habeck called for more immigration to Germany, saying the shortage of skilled workers was the country's "most pressing structural problem". Net immigration to Germany was 663,000 in 2023, down from a record 1,462,000 in 2022.

=== Poverty ===
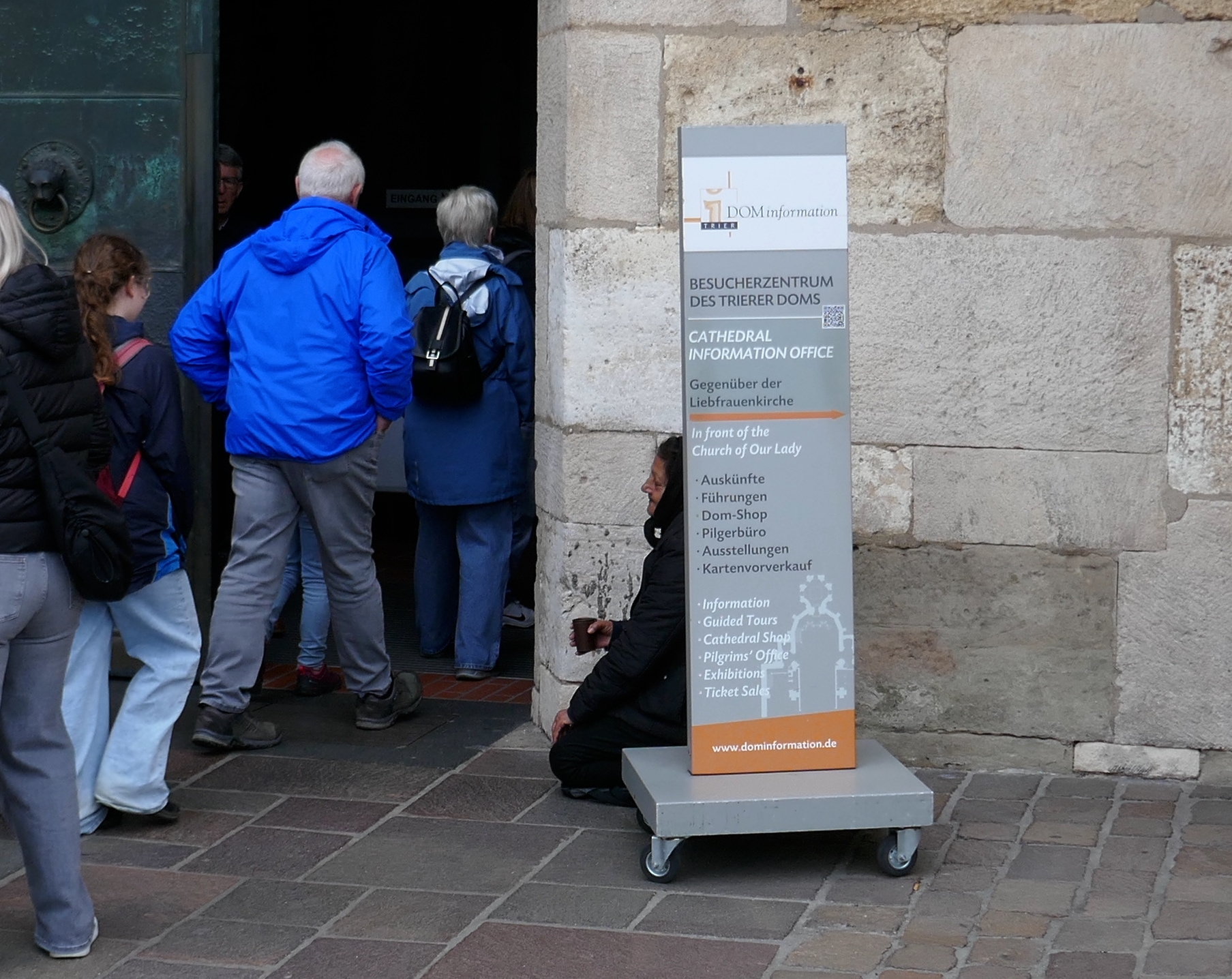
A beggar in Trier, Germany

In recent decades, poverty in Germany has been increasing. Children are more likely to be poor than adults. There has been a strong increase in the number of poor children. In 1965, only one in 75 children lived on welfare, in 2007 one in 6 did.

Poverty rates differ by states. In 2007, only 6.6% of children and 3.9% of all citizens in states like Bavaria were impoverished. In Berlin, 15.2% of the inhabitants and 30.7% of the children received welfare payments.

The German Kinderhilfswerk, an organization caring for children in need has demanded the government to do something about the poverty problem.

As of 2015, poverty in Germany was at its highest since the German reunification (1990). Some 12.5 million Germans are now classified as poor.

=== Homelessness ===
Homelessness in Germany is a significant social issue, estimated to affect around 678,000 people, including about 372,000 people accommodated by public services, e.g., in municipal refugee shelters. As of 2017 there had been a 150% increase in the homeless population within the country since 2014. Around 22,000 of the homeless population are reported to be children.

In addition, the country has yet to publish statistics on homelessness at a Federal Level despite it being an ongoing and widespread matter.

=== Climate change ===
As a highly industrial, urbanized economy with a relatively short coastline compared to other major economies, the effects of climate change on Germany are more narrowly focused than other major economies. Germany's traditional industrial regions are typically the most vulnerable to climate change. These are mostly located in the provinces of North Rhine-Westphalia, Saarland, Rhineland-Palatinate, Thuringia, Saxony, Schleswig-Holstein and the free cities of Bremen and Hamburg.

The Rhineland is historically a heavily industrial and population-dense area which includes the states of North Rhine-Westphalia, Rhineland Palatinate, and Saarland. This region is rich in iron and coal deposits and supports one of Europe's largest coal industries. In the past, sulfuric acid emissions from Rhineland coal plants contributed to acid rain, damaging forests in other regions like Hesse, Thuringia, and Saxony.

Other significant problems for the Rhineland related to its high level of industrialization include the destruction of infrastructure from extreme weather events, loss of water for industrial purposes, and fluctuation of the ground water level. Since these problems are related to its level of industrialization, cities within other regions are also sensitive to these challenges including Munich and Bremen.

== See also ==
- Economy of Berlin
- List of companies of Germany
- List of largest German companies
- Association of German Chambers of Industry and Commerce
- German Federal Association of Young Entrepreneurs
- Codetermination in Germany
- Corruption in Germany
- Deutsche Bundesbank
- Economic Council Germany
- Equalization payments in Germany
- Federal Ministry for Economic Affairs and Energy
- Federal Ministry for Economic Cooperation and Development
- Federal Ministry of Finance (Germany)
- Federal Ministry for Housing, Urban Development and Building
- Federal Ministry of Labour and Social Affairs
- German company law
- German labour law
- German model
- List of German cities by GDP
- List of German states by household income
- List of German states by unemployment rate
- Made in Germany
- Metropolitan regions in Germany
- Ordoliberalism
- Trade unions in Germany
- Work–life balance in Germany
- Economy of the European Union
- Economy of Europe
