= List of exports of Germany =

Exports of Germany by product category (2019) Chemical products Transportation Machines Mineral products Plastics and rubbers Metals Foodstuffs Precious metals Textiles Instruments Animal products Vegetable products Paper goods Footwear and headwear Miscellaneous Stone and glass Wood products Animal and vegetable bi-products Animal hides Arts and antiques Weapons

The following is a list of the exports of Germany. Data is for 2022, in millions of United States dollars, as reported by International Trade Centre. Currently the top thirty exports are listed.

#	Product category	Value (million US$)
1	Cars	155,687
2	Medicaments	73,993
3	Vehicle parts	60,739
4	Unspecified commodities	54,622
5	Human or animal blood, vaccines and similar products, cell cultures	44,489
6	Petroleum	25,106
7	Aircraft	22,252
8	Integrated circuits	19,746
9	Electricity	18,667
10	Medical instruments	17,627
11	Other Machines	16,974
12	Electrical apparatus for electrical circuits	16,797
13	Computers	16,426
14	Centrifuges	16,132
15	Taps, cocks, valves	14,610
16	Boards, panels, consoles, desks, cabinets and other base	13,332
17	Internal combustion engine parts	12,789
18	Transmission shafts	12,685
19	Electrical transformers	12,364
20	Telephones	11,122
21	Petroleum Gas	11,001
22	Pumps for liquids	10,936
23	Plastics	10,892
24	Air or vacuum pumps	10,371
25	Cables	10,075
26	Trucks	9,624
27	Semiconductor devices	9,442
28	Chemical instruments	9,010
29	Furniture and parts thereof	8,980
30	Measuring or checking instruments	8,780

== See also ==
- Economy of Germany
