= Homeownership in Germany =

Proprietorship of dwellings in Germany

Home ownership in Germany is lower overall than in most other European countries. In 2022, Germany's homeownership rate was 46.7%. During World War II, 2.25 million homes were destroyed with another two million damaged, reducing overall housing stocks by 20%. In 1949, West Germany enacted its first housing law and by 1961 had reduced its housing shortage from 5.5 million units to only 658,000. The mortgage market remained weak with banks requiring large downpayments from borrowers.

Germany has comparatively low rental prices and a high proportion of rent controlled units. The German government does not deduct mortgage interest payments from taxes. In the 2000s, Germany reduced government subsidies for homeownership.
