= Germany =

Country in Europe

Federal Republic of Germany Bundesrepublik Deutschland
- Flag Coat of arms
- Anthem: "Das Lied der Deutschen" (Note: From 1952 to 1990, the entire "Das Lied der Deutschen" was the national anthem, but only the third verse was sung on official occasions. Since 1991, the third verse alone has been the national anthem.); The Song of the Germans
- Capital and largest city: Berlin (Note: Berlin is the sole constitutional capital and de jure seat of government, but the former provisional capital of the Federal Republic of Germany, Bonn, has the special title of "federal city" (Bundesstadt) and is the primary seat of 16 ministries.); 52°31′N 13°23′E
- Official languages: German (Note: Danish, Low German, Sorbian, Romani, and Frisian are recognised by the European Charter for Regional or Minority Languages.)
- Demonym: German
- Government: Federal parliamentary republic
  - President: Frank-Walter Steinmeier
  - Chancellor: Friedrich Merz
- Legislature: Bundestag; Bundesrat

Area
  - Total: 357,022 km^{2} (137,847 sq mi) (63rd)
  - Water (%): 1.27

Population
  - Q4 2025 estimate: ▼83,467,117
  - 2022 census: ▲82,719,540 (19th)
  - Density: 233/km^{2} (603.5/sq mi) (63rd)
- GDP (PPP): 2026 estimate
  - Total: ▲$6.551 trillion (6th)
  - Per capita: ▲$78,664 (20th)
- GDP (nominal): 2026 estimate
  - Total: ▲$5.471 trillion (3rd)
  - Per capita: ▲$65,699 (16th)
- Gini (2025): ▲30.1 medium inequality
- HDI (2023): ▲0.959 very high (5th)
- Currency: Euro (€) (EUR)
- Time zone: UTC+1 (CET)
  - Summer (DST): UTC+2 (CEST)
- Date format: Day, month, year; Year, month, day
- Calling code: +49
- ISO 3166 code: DE
- Internet TLD: .de

Germany, (Note: German: Deutschland; German: [ˈdɔʏtʃlant]) officially the Federal Republic of Germany, (Note: German: Bundesrepublik Deutschland; German: [ˈbʊndəsʁepuˌbliːk ˈdɔʏtʃlant]) is a country in Western and Central Europe. It lies between the Baltic Sea and the North Sea to the north with the Alps to the south. Its 16 constituent states have a total population of over 83 million, making it the most populous member state of the European Union (EU). Germany borders Denmark to the north; Poland and the Czech Republic to the east; Austria and Switzerland to the south; and France, Luxembourg, Belgium, and the Netherlands to the west. The nation's capital and most populous city is Berlin and its main financial centre is Frankfurt; the largest urban area is the Ruhr.

Settlement in the territory of modern Germany began in the Lower Paleolithic, with various tribes inhabiting it from the Neolithic onward, chiefly the Celts, and Germanic tribes inhabiting the north. Romans named the area Germania. In 962, the Kingdom of Germany formed the bulk of the Holy Roman Empire. During the 16th century, northern German regions became the centre of the Protestant Reformation. Following the Napoleonic Wars and the dissolution of the Holy Roman Empire in 1806, the German Confederation was formed in 1815.

Unification of Germany into the modern nation-state, led by Prussia, established the German Empire in 1871. After World War I and the German revolution, the Empire was replaced by the Weimar Republic. The Nazi rise to power in 1933 led to the establishment of a totalitarian dictatorship under Adolf Hitler, which resulted in World War II and the Holocaust. In 1949, after the war and Allied occupation, Germany was organised into two separate polities with limited sovereignty: the Federal Republic of Germany (FRG), or West Germany, and the German Democratic Republic (GDR), or East Germany. The FRG was a founding member of the European Economic Community, while the GDR was a communist Eastern Bloc state and a founding member of the Warsaw Pact. After the fall of the communist-led government in East Germany, German reunification saw the former East German states join the FRG on 3 October 1990. Germany regained its full sovereignty on 15 March 1991.

Germany is a developed country with a strong economy, the largest in Europe by nominal GDP. As a major force in several industrial, scientific and technological sectors, Germany is both the world's third-largest exporter and third-largest importer. Widely considered a great power, Germany is part of multiple international organisations and forums. It has the third-highest number of UNESCO World Heritage Sites: 55, of which 52 are cultural.

== Etymology ==
The English word Germany derives from the Latin Germania, which came into use after Julius Caesar adopted it for the peoples east of the Rhine. The German term Deutschland, originally diutisciu land ('the German lands'), is derived from deutsch (cf. Dutch), which descended from Old High German diutisc 'of the people' (from diot or diota 'people'), originally used to distinguish the language of the common people from Latin and its Romance descendants. This in turn descends from Proto-Germanic *þiudiskaz 'of the people' (see also the Latinised form Theodiscus), derived from *þeudō, descended from Proto-Indo-European *tewtéh₂- 'people', from which the word Teutons also originates.

== History ==
=== Prehistory ===
Ancient humans were present in what is now Germany at least 600,000 years ago. The first non-modern human fossil (the Neanderthal) was discovered in the Neander Valley. Similarly dated evidence of modern humans has been found in the Swabian Jura, including 42,000-year-old flutes which are the oldest musical instruments ever found, the 40,000-year-old Lion-man, and the 41,000-year-old Venus of Hohle Fels.

=== Germanic tribes, Roman frontier and the Frankish Empire ===
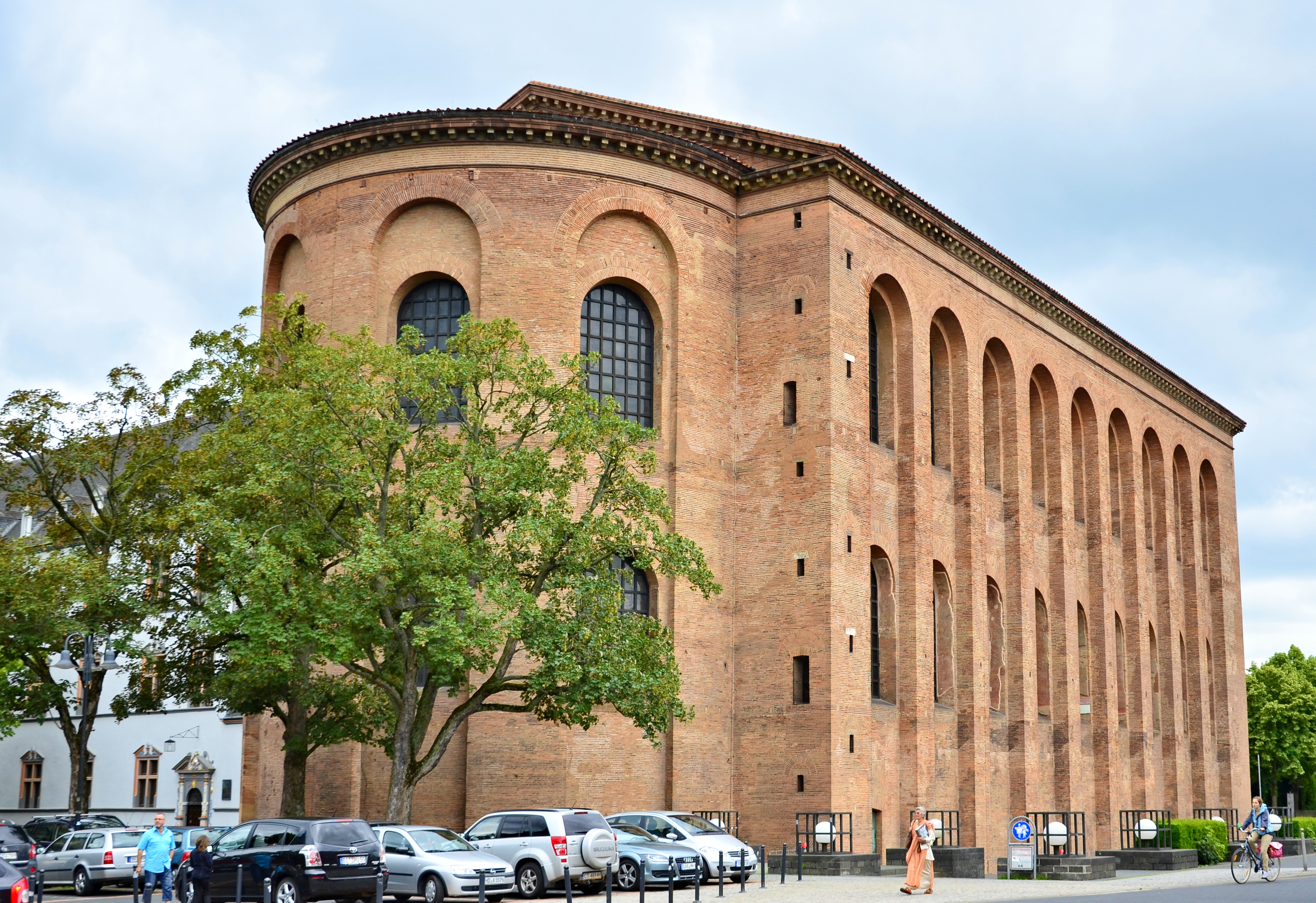
Basilica of Constantine in Trier (Augusta Treverorum), built in the 4th century

From southern Scandinavia and northern Germany, the Germanic peoples expanded south, east, and west, coming into contact with the Celtic, Iranian, Baltic, and Slavic tribes. Southern Germany was inhabited by Celtic-speaking peoples, who belonged to the wider La Tène culture. They were later assimilated by the Germanic conquerors.

Under Augustus, the Roman Empire began to invade lands inhabited by the Germanic tribes, creating a short-lived Roman province of Germania between the Rhine and Elbe rivers. In 9 AD, three Roman legions were defeated by Arminius in the Battle of the Teutoburg Forest. The outcome of this battle dissuaded the Romans from their ambition of conquering Germania and is thus considered one of the most significant events in European history. By 100 AD, when Tacitus wrote Germania, Germanic tribes had settled along the Rhine and the Danube (the Limes Germanicus), occupying most of modern Germany. However, Baden-Württemberg, southern Bavaria, southern Hesse and the western Rhineland had been incorporated into Roman provinces.

Around 260, Germanic peoples broke into Roman-controlled lands. After the invasion of the Huns in 375, and with the decline of Rome from 395, Germanic tribes moved farther southwest: the Franks established the Frankish Kingdom and pushed east to subjugate Saxony and Bavaria. Areas of modern eastern Germany were inhabited by Western Slavic tribes.

=== East Francia and the Holy Roman Empire ===
The medieval Kingdom of Germany (Regnum Teutonicum) within the Holy Roman Empire in 1004

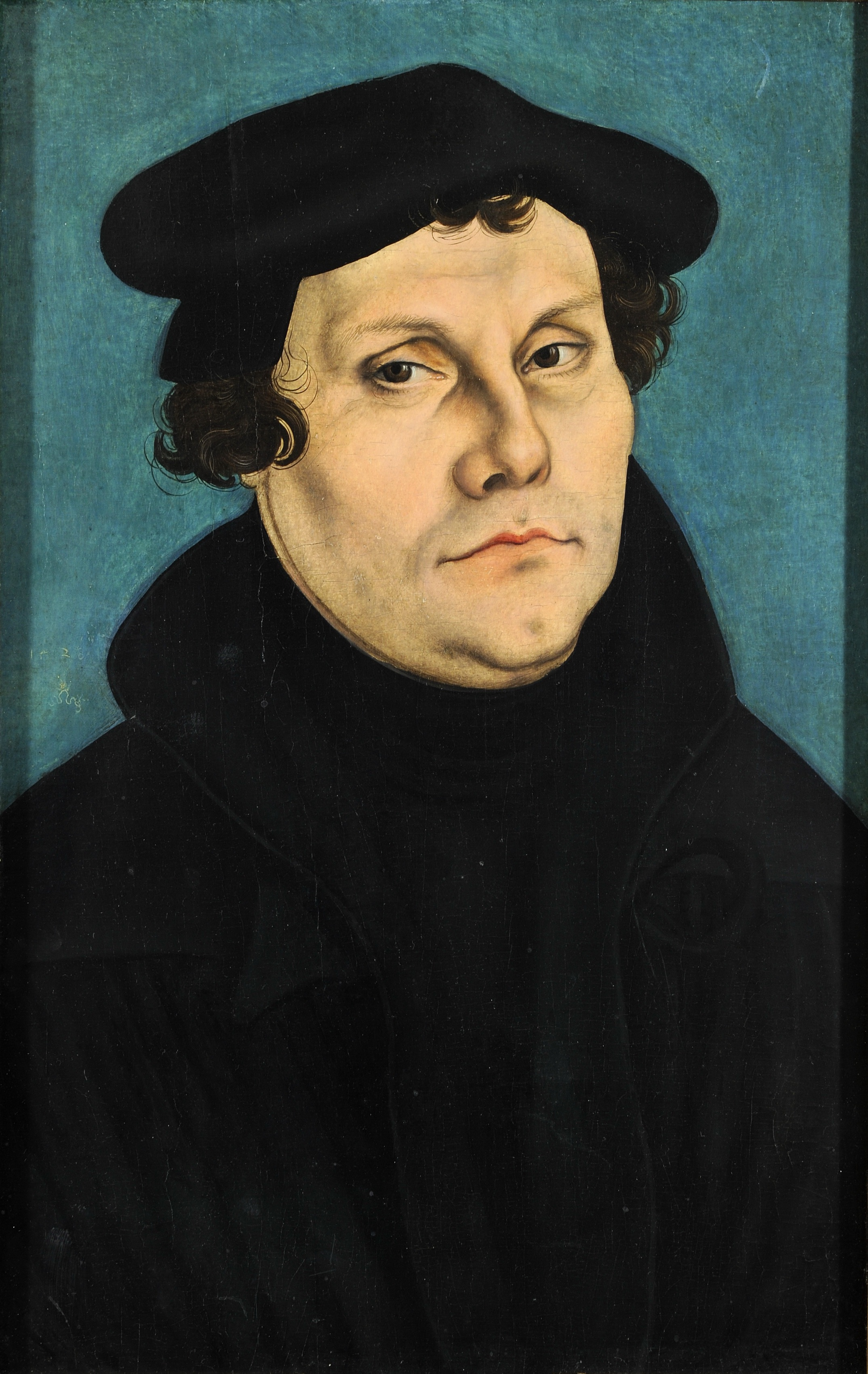
Martin Luther, born in Eisleben in 1483, challenged the indulgences of the Catholic Church, giving rise to the Reformation and Protestantism.

Charlemagne founded the Carolingian Empire in 800; it was divided in 843. The eastern successor kingdom of East Francia stretched from the Rhine in the west to the Elbe river in the east and from the North Sea to the Alps. Subsequently, the Kingdom of Germany and the Holy Roman Empire emerged from it. The Ottonian rulers (919–1024) consolidated several major duchies. In 996, Gregory V became the first German Pope, appointed by his cousin Otto III, whom he shortly after crowned Holy Roman Emperor. The Holy Roman Empire absorbed northern Italy and Burgundy under the Salian emperors (1024–1125), although the emperors lost power through the Investiture Controversy.

Under the Hohenstaufen emperors (1138–1254), German princes encouraged German settlement to the south and east (Ostsiedlung). Members of the Hanseatic League, mostly north German towns, prospered in the expansion of trade. The population declined starting with the Great Famine in 1315, followed by the Black Death of 1348–1350. The Golden Bull issued in 1356 provided the constitutional structure of the Empire and codified the election of the emperor by seven prince-electors.

Johannes Gutenberg introduced moveable-type printing to Europe, laying the basis for the democratisation of knowledge. Following Martin Luther's 1517 Protestant Reformation, bolstered by his standardised Bible translation, led to the 1555 Peace of Augsburg, which recognised Lutheranism under the principle of cuius regio, eius religio (ruler's faith dictates subjects' faith). From the Cologne War through the Thirty Years' Wars (1618–1648), religious conflict devastated German lands and significantly reduced the population.

The Peace of Westphalia ended religious warfare among the Imperial Estates. The legal system initiated by a series of Imperial Reforms (approximately 1495–1555) provided for considerable local autonomy and a stronger Imperial Diet. The House of Habsburg held the imperial crown from 1438 until the death of Charles VI in 1740. Following the War of the Austrian Succession and the Treaty of Aix-la-Chapelle, Charles VI's daughter Maria Theresa ruled as empress consort when her husband, Francis I, became emperor.

From 1740, dualism between the Austrian Habsburg monarchy and the Kingdom of Prussia dominated German history. In 1772, 1793, and 1795, Prussia and Austria, along with the Russian Empire, agreed to the Partitions of Poland. During the period of the French Revolutionary Wars, the Napoleonic era and the subsequent final meeting of the Imperial Diet, most of the Free Imperial Cities were annexed by dynastic territories; the ecclesiastical territories were secularised and annexed. In 1806, the Imperium was dissolved; France, Russia, Prussia, and the Habsburgs (Austria) competed for hegemony in the German states during the Napoleonic Wars.

=== German Confederation and Empire ===
The German Confederation in 1815

Following the fall of Napoleon, the Congress of Vienna founded the German Confederation, a loose league of 39 sovereign states. The appointment of the emperor of Austria as the permanent president reflected the Congress' rejection of Prussia's rising influence. Disagreement within restoration politics partly led to the rise of liberal movements, followed by new measures of repression by Austrian statesman Klemens von Metternich. The Zollverein, a tariff union, furthered economic unity. In light of revolutionary movements in Europe, intellectuals and commoners started the revolutions of 1848 in the German states, raising the German question. King Frederick William IV of Prussia was offered the title of emperor, but with a loss of power; he rejected the crown and the proposed constitution, a temporary setback for the movement.

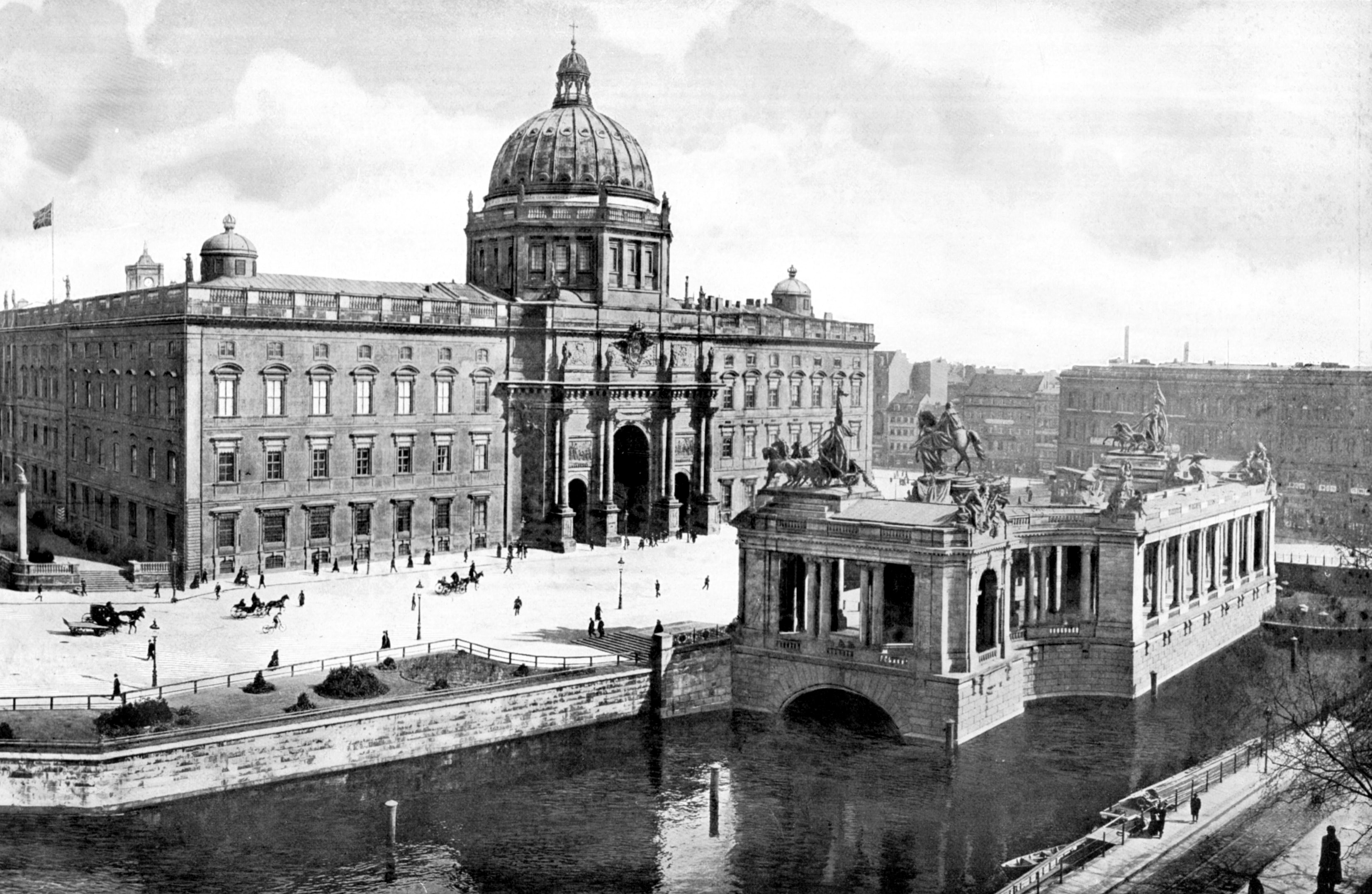
Berlin Palace, the main residence of the Kings of Prussia and German Emperors

King William I appointed Otto von Bismarck as the Minister President of Prussia in 1862. Bismarck successfully concluded the war with Denmark in 1864; the subsequent decisive Prussian victory in the Austro-Prussian War of 1866 enabled him to create the North German Confederation which excluded Austria. After the defeat of France in the Franco-Prussian War, the German princes proclaimed the founding of the German Empire in 1871. Prussia was the dominant constituent state of the new empire; the King of Prussia ruled as its Emperor (Kaiser), and Berlin became its capital.

In the Gründerzeit period following the unification of Germany, Bismarck's foreign policy as chancellor of Germany secured Germany's position as a great nation by forging alliances and avoiding war. However, under Wilhelm II, Germany took an imperialistic course, leading to friction with neighbouring countries. A dual alliance was created with the multinational realm of Austria-Hungary; the Triple Alliance of 1882 included Italy. Britain, France and Russia also concluded alliances to protect against Habsburg interference with Russian interests in the Balkans or German interference against France. At the Berlin Conference in 1884, Germany claimed several colonies including German East Africa, German South West Africa, Togoland, and Kamerun. Germany later expanded its colonial empire to include holdings in the Pacific and China. The colonial government in South West Africa (present-day Namibia), from 1904 to 1908, carried out the annihilation of the local Herero and Nama peoples as punishment for an uprising; this was the 20th century's first genocide.

The assassination of Austria's crown prince on 28 June 1914 provided the pretext for Austria-Hungary to attack Serbia and trigger World War I. After four years of warfare, in which approximately two million German soldiers were killed, a general armistice ended the fighting. In the German Revolution (November 1918), Wilhelm II and the ruling princes abdicated their positions.

=== Weimar Republic and Nazi Germany ===
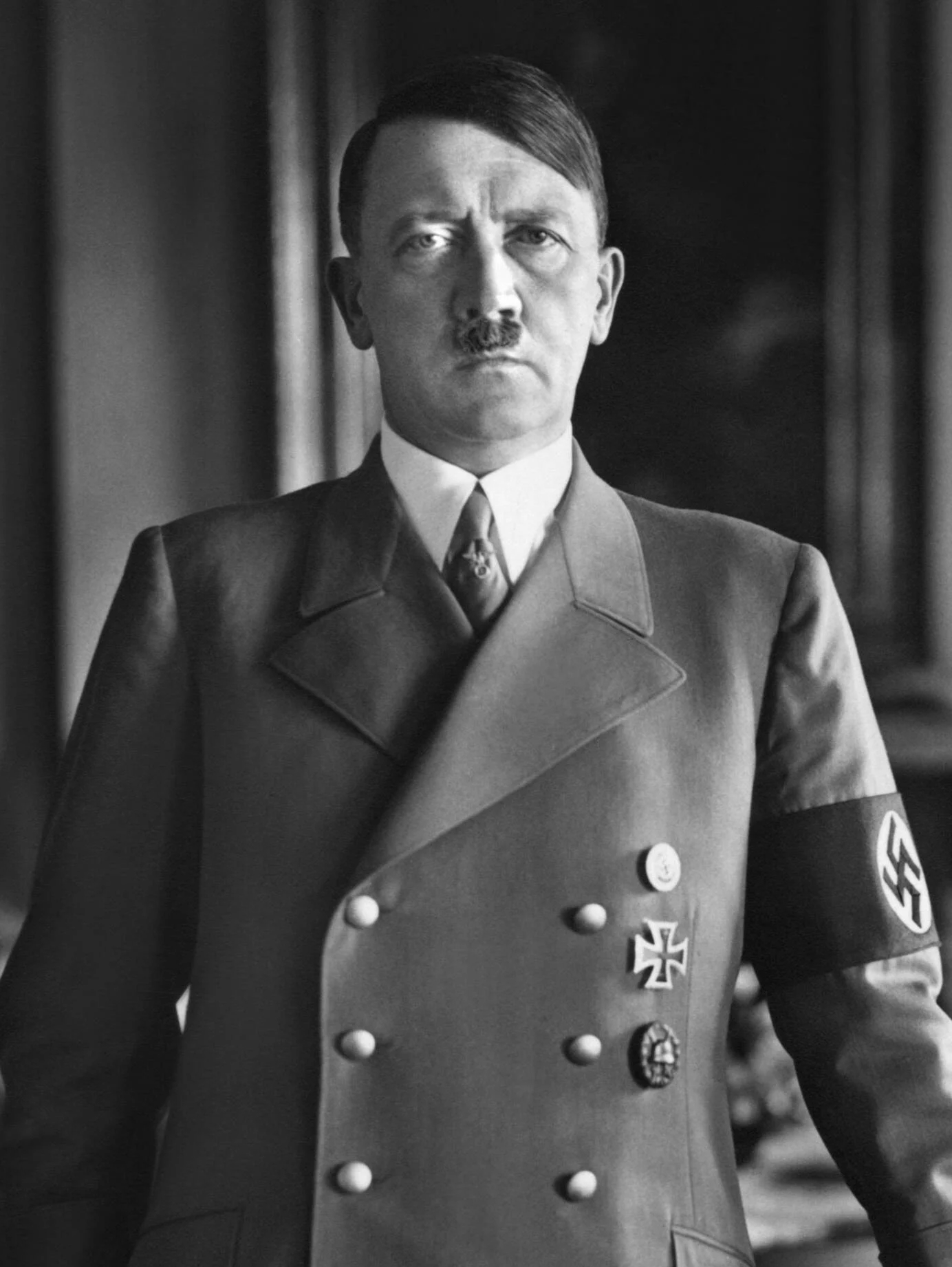
Adolf Hitler, dictatorial Führer of Nazi Germany from 1933 until his suicide in 1945

On 9 November 1918, Philipp Scheidemann, a Social Democrat, proclaimed the German Republic, marking Germany's transition to a federal democratic state. Germany's new leadership signed the Treaty of Versailles in 1919, accepting defeat by the Allies. Germans perceived the treaty as humiliating, which was seen by historians as influential in the rise of Adolf Hitler. Germany lost around 13% of its European territory and ceded all of its colonial possessions.

On 11 August 1919, President Friedrich Ebert signed the democratic Weimar Constitution. Communists briefly seized power in Bavaria and a few larger cities, while conservative elements failed to overthrow the central government in the 1920 Kapp Putsch. The occupation of the Ruhr by Belgian and French troops and a period of hyperinflation followed. A plan to restructure Germany's war reparations and the creation of a new currency in 1924 helped stabilise the government and ushered in the Golden Twenties, an era of artistic innovation and liberal cultural life.

In 1929, the Great Depression hit Germany, and by 1932 the unemployment rate had risen to nearly 30%. The Nazi Party led by Adolf Hitler became the largest party in the Reichstag after the election of July 1932, and President Hindenburg appointed Hitler as chancellor on 30 January 1933. After the Reichstag fire, a decree abrogated basic civil rights, and the first Nazi concentration camp opened. On 23 March 1933, the Enabling Act gave Hitler unrestricted legislative power, overriding the constitution, and marked the beginning of Nazi Germany. His government established a centralised totalitarian state, withdrew from the League of Nations, and dramatically increased Germany's rearmament. A government-sponsored programme for economic renewal focused on public works, the most famous of which was the Autobahn.

In 1935, the regime withdrew from the Treaty of Versailles and introduced the Nuremberg Laws which targeted Jews and other minorities. Germany also reacquired control of the Saarland in 1935, remilitarised the Rhineland in 1936, annexed Austria in 1938, annexed the Sudetenland in 1938 with the Munich Agreement, and, in violation of the agreement, occupied Czechoslovakia in March 1939. Kristallnacht (Night of Broken Glass) saw the burning of synagogues, the destruction of Jewish businesses, and mass arrests of Jewish people.

In August 1939, Hitler's government negotiated the Molotov–Ribbentrop Pact that divided Eastern Europe into German and Soviet spheres of influence. On 1 September 1939, Germany invaded Poland, beginning World War II in Europe; Britain and France declared war on Germany on 3 September. In spring 1940, Germany conquered Denmark and Norway, the Netherlands, Belgium, Luxembourg, and France. The British repelled German air attacks in the Battle of Britain in the same year. In 1941, German troops invaded Yugoslavia, Greece and the Soviet Union, and Germany declared war on the United States. By 1942, Germany and its allies controlled most of continental Europe and North Africa, but following the Soviet victory at the Battle of Stalingrad, the Allied reconquest of North Africa and invasion of Italy in 1943, German forces suffered repeated military defeats. In 1944, the Soviets pushed into Eastern Europe; the Western allies landed in France and entered Germany despite a final German counteroffensive. Following Hitler's suicide during the Battle of Berlin, Germany signed the surrender document on 8 May 1945, ending World War II in Europe and Nazi Germany. After the war, surviving Nazi officials were tried for war crimes at the Nuremberg trials.

Discrimination was institutionalised through legislation and perpetrated at an industrial scale with concentration and death camps across Europe. The crimes against humanity culminated in but were not limited to what later became known as the Holocaust, the systematic murdering of around 6 million Jews. Several other minority groups were targeted: at least 130,000 Romani, 275,000 disabled, thousands of Jehovah's Witnesses, thousands of homosexuals, and hundreds of thousands of political and religious opponents. Nazi policies in German-occupied countries resulted in the deaths of an estimated 2.7 million Poles, 1.3 million Ukrainians, 1 million Belarusians and 3.5 million Soviet prisoners of war. German military casualties have been estimated at 5.3 million, and around 900,000 German civilians died.

During the later stages of and after World War II, around 12 million ethnic Germans were expelled from across Eastern Europe, and Germany lost roughly one-quarter of its pre-war territory.

=== East and West Germany ===
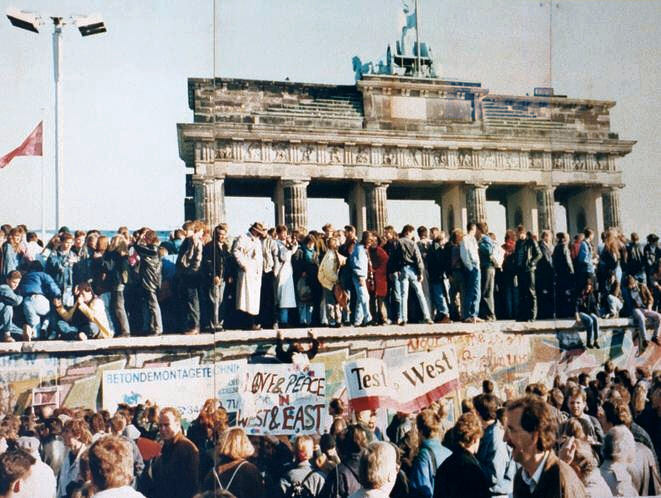
The fall of the Berlin Wall in 1989 was one of the first developments in the end of the Cold War, leading ultimately to the dissolution of the Soviet Union.

After the surrender of Nazi Germany, the Allies de jure abolished the German state and partitioned Berlin and Germany's remaining territory into four occupation zones. The western sectors, controlled by France, the United Kingdom, and the United States, were merged on 23 May 1949 to form the Federal Republic of Germany (FRG) (German: Bundesrepublik Deutschland; BRD); on 7 October 1949, the Soviet Zone became the German Democratic Republic (GDR) (Deutsche Demokratische Republik; DDR). They were informally known as West Germany and East Germany. East Germany selected East Berlin as its capital, while West Germany chose Bonn as a provisional capital to emphasize its stance that the two-state solution was temporary.

West Germany was established as a federal parliamentary republic with a social market economy. In 1948, West Germany became a major recipient of reconstruction aid under the American Marshall Plan. Konrad Adenauer was elected the first federal chancellor of Germany in 1949. The country enjoyed prolonged economic growth (Wirtschaftswunder) beginning in the early 1950s. West Germany joined NATO in 1955 and was a founding member of the European Economic Community. On 1 January 1957, the Saarland joined West Germany.

East Germany remained under political and military control by the Soviet Union via occupation forces and became an Eastern Bloc state, joining the Soviet-led Warsaw Pact and Comecon. Although East Germany claimed to be a democracy, political power was exercised solely by leading members (Politbüro) of the Socialist Unity Party of Germany that was closely aligned with the Communist Party of the Soviet Union. An extensive domestic intelligence programme led by the intelligence agency Stasi was launched that utilized a vast network of informants to crush dissent. While East German propaganda was based on the benefits of the GDR's social programmes and the alleged threat of a West German invasion, many of its citizens looked to the West for freedom and prosperity. The Berlin Wall, built in 1961, prevented East German citizens from escaping to West Germany, becoming a symbol of the Cold War.

Tensions between East and West Germany were reduced in the late 1960s by Chancellor Willy Brandt's Ostpolitik. In 1989, Hungary dismantled the Iron Curtain and opened its Austrian border, triggering a mass emigration of East Germans to West Germany. This had devastating effects on the GDR, where regular mass demonstrations received increasing support. In an effort to help retain East Germany as a state, the East German authorities eased border restrictions, but this led to an acceleration of the Wende reform process, culminating in the Two Plus Four Treaty under which Germany explicitly renounced claims to the former eastern territories and regained full sovereignty from the Allies. This permitted German reunification on 3 October 1990, with the dissolution of the GDR and the accession of the five re-established states to the FRG. The fall of the Berlin Wall in 1989 became a symbol of the fall of Communism, the dissolution of the Soviet Union, German reunification and Die Wende ("the turning point").

=== Reunified Germany and the European Union ===
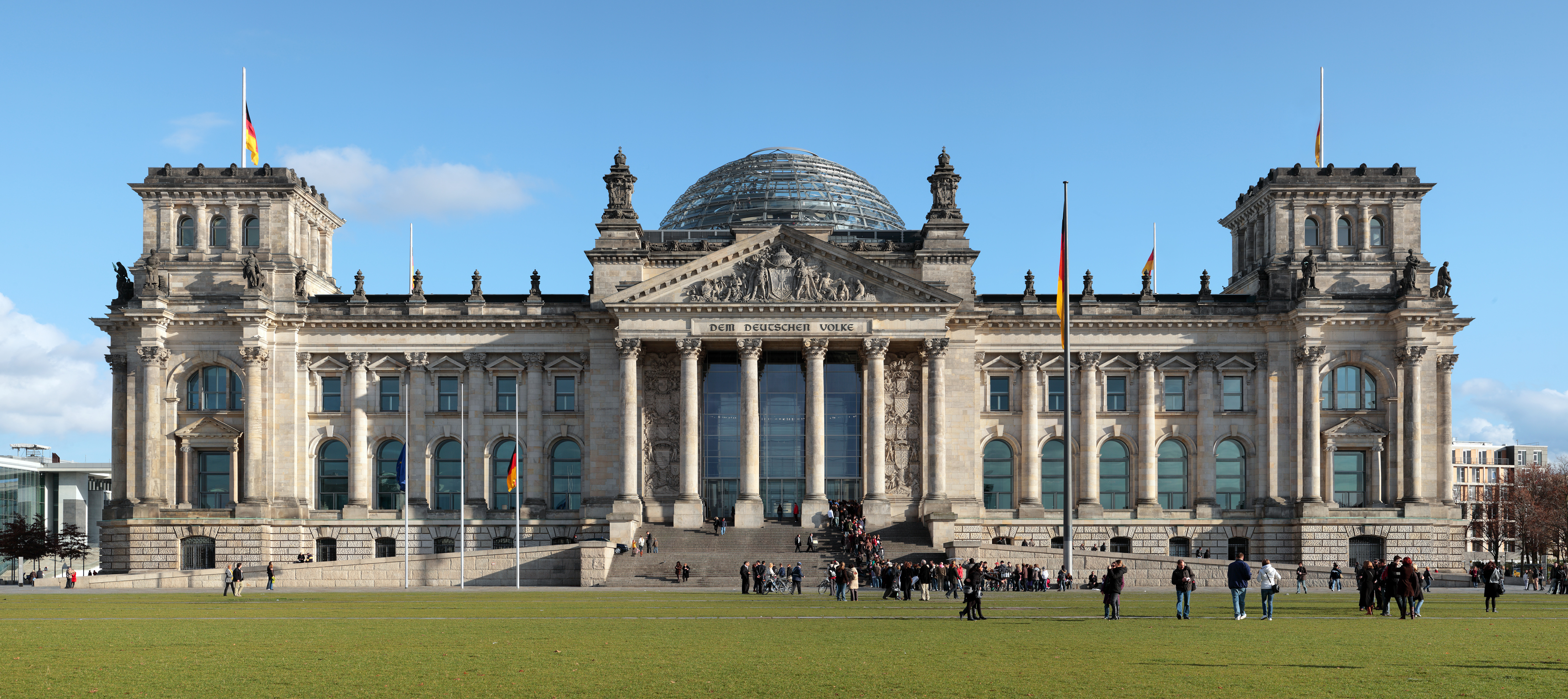
The Berlin/Bonn Act made Berlin the capital of Germany again, with the Reichstag becoming the seat of the German parliament in 1999.

United Germany was considered the enlarged continuation of West Germany, so it retained its memberships in international organisations. Based on the Berlin/Bonn Act of 1994, Berlin again became the capital of Germany, while Bonn obtained the unique status of a Bundesstadt (federal city), retaining some federal ministries. The relocation of the government was completed in 1999, and modernisation of the East German economy was scheduled to last until 2019.

Since reunification, Germany has taken a more active role in the European Union, signing the Maastricht Treaty in 1992 and the Lisbon Treaty in 2007, and co-founding the eurozone. Germany sent a peacekeeping force to secure stability in the Balkans and sent German troops to Afghanistan as part of a NATO effort to provide security in that country after the ousting of the Taliban.

In the 2005 elections, Angela Merkel became the first female chancellor. In 2009, the German government approved a €50 billion stimulus plan. Among the major German political projects of the early 21st century are the advancement of European integration, the country's energy transition (Energiewende) for a sustainable energy supply, the debt brake for balanced budgets, measures to increase the fertility rate (pronatalism), and high-tech strategies for the transition of the German economy, summarised as Industry 4.0. During the 2015 European migrant crisis, the country took in over a million refugees and migrants. Following the Russian invasion of Ukraine in 2022, Germany received over 1.2 million refugees from Ukraine.

== Geography ==
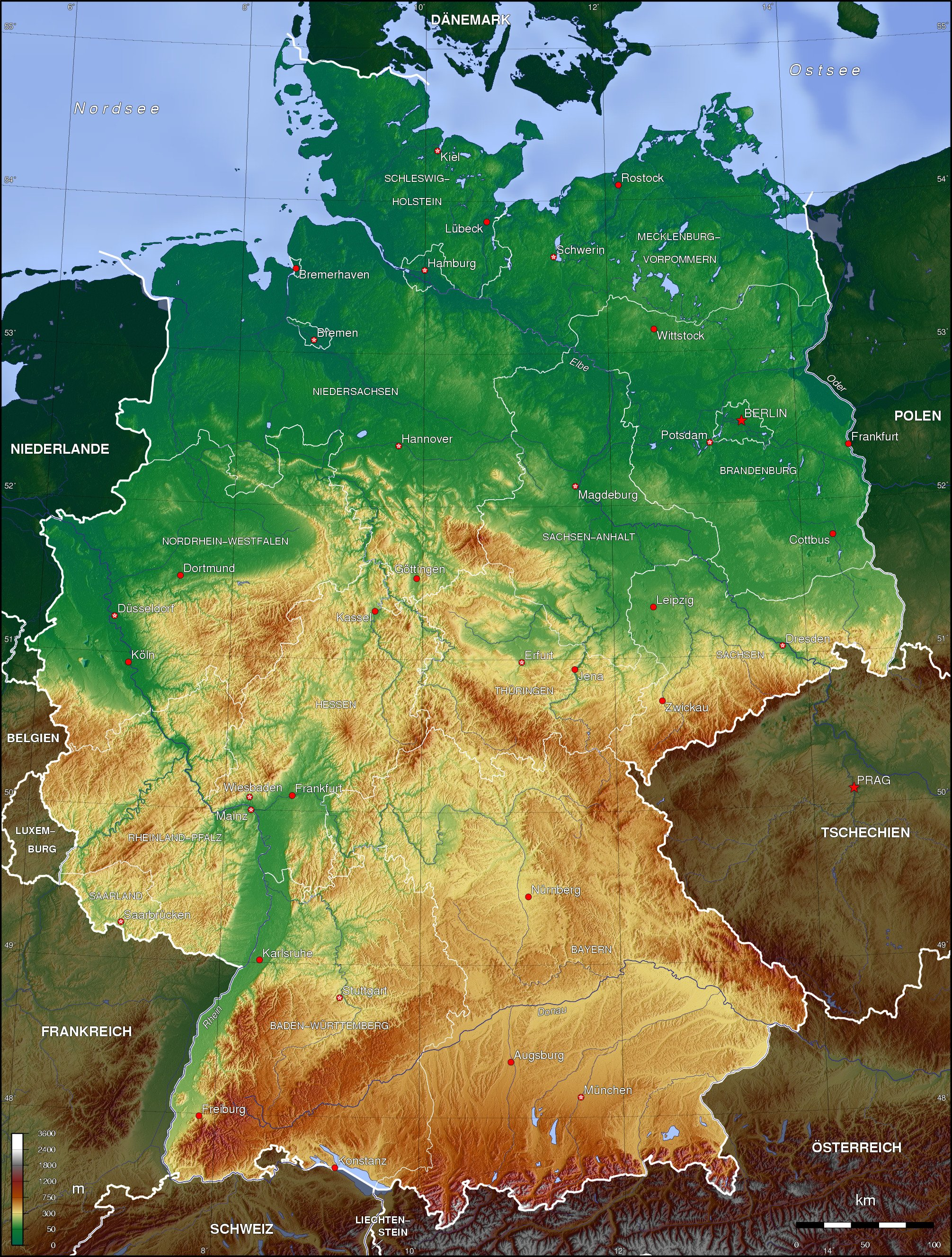
A physical map of Germany

Germany is the seventh-largest country in Europe. It borders Denmark to the north; Poland and the Czech Republic to the east; Austria and Switzerland to the south; and France, Luxembourg, Belgium, and the Netherlands to the west. Germany is also bordered by the North Sea (Nordsee) in the northwest and the Baltic Sea (Ostsee) in the northeast. German territory covers 357,022 km^{2} (137,847 sq mi). Elevation ranges from the mountains of the Alps (with the highest point being the Zugspitze at 2,963 metres or 9,721 feet) in the south to the shores of the North Sea and the Baltic Sea. The forested uplands of central Germany and the lowlands of northern Germany (lowest point: in the municipality Neuendorf-Sachsenbande, Wilstermarsch, at 3.54 metres or 11.6 feet below sea level) are traversed by major rivers such as the Rhine, Danube, and Elbe. Significant natural resources include iron ore, coal, potash, timber, lignite, uranium, copper, natural gas, salt, and nickel.

=== Climate ===
Most of Germany has a temperate climate, ranging from oceanic in the north and west to continental in the east and southeast. A small portion is humid subtropical. Winters range from cold in the Southern Alps to cool and are generally overcast with limited precipitation, while summers can vary from hot and dry to cool and rainy. The northern regions have prevailing westerly winds that bring in moist air from the North Sea, moderating the temperature and increasing precipitation. Conversely, the southeast regions have more extreme temperatures. Climate change in Germany is leading to long-term impacts on agriculture, more intense heat waves and cold waves, flash and coastal flooding, and reduced water availability.

From February 2019–February 2020, average monthly temperatures in Germany ranged from a low of 3.3 °C (37.9 °F) in January 2020 to a high of 19.8 °C (67.6 °F) in June 2019. Average monthly precipitation ranged from 30 litres per square metre in February and April 2019 to 125 litres per square metre in February 2020. Average monthly hours of sunshine ranged from 45 in November 2019 to 300 in June 2019.

=== Biodiversity ===
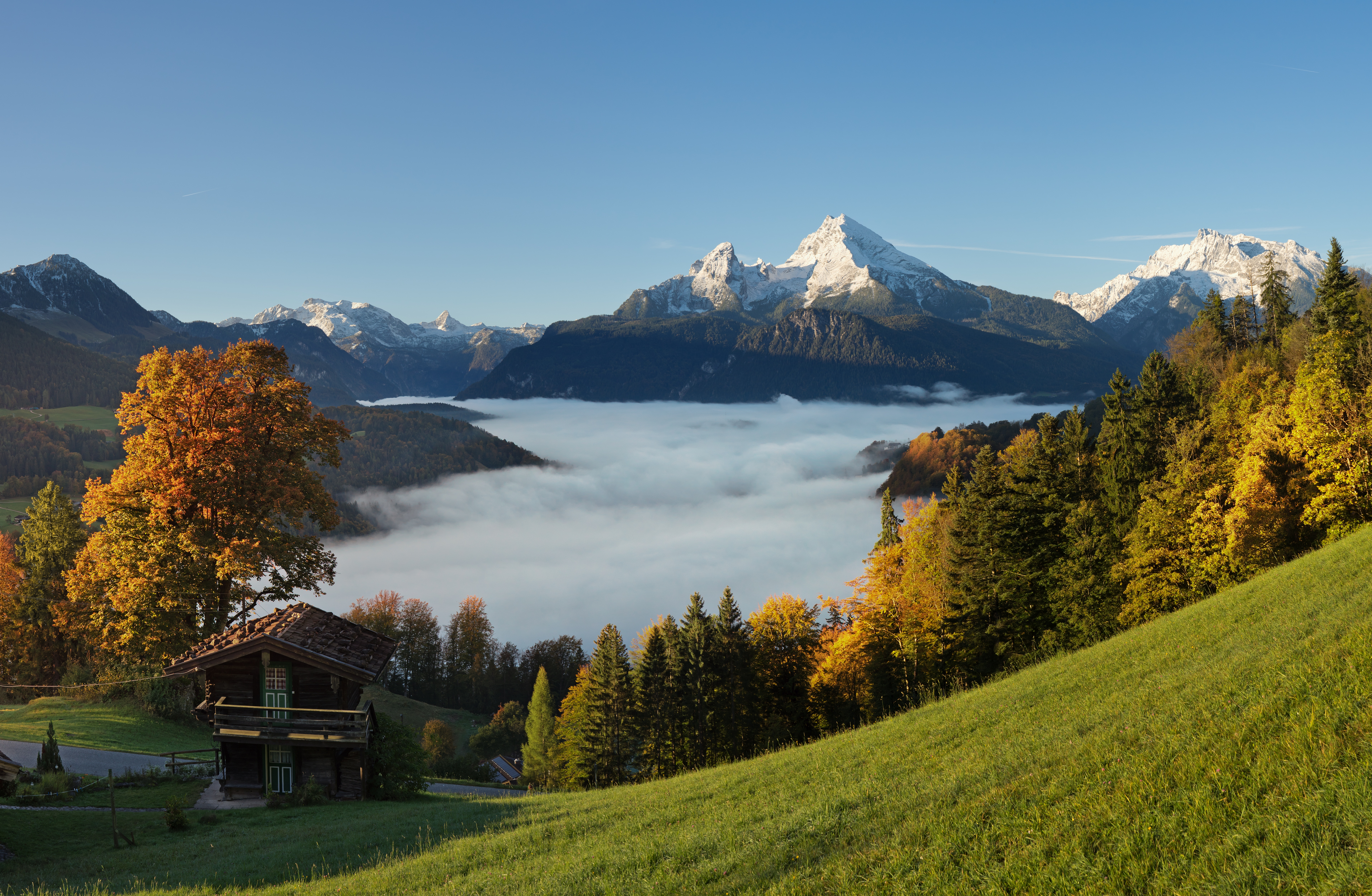
Berchtesgaden National Park in Bavaria

The territory of Germany is divided into five terrestrial ecoregions: Atlantic mixed forests, Baltic mixed forests, Central European mixed forests, Western European broadleaf forests, and Alps conifer and mixed forests. As of 2016, 51% of Germany's land area is devoted to agriculture, while 30% is forested and 14% is covered by settlements or infrastructure.

Plants and animals include those generally common to Central Europe. According to the National Forest Inventory, beeches, oaks, and other deciduous trees constitute just over 40% of Germany's forests; roughly 60% are conifers, particularly spruce and pine. There are many species of ferns, flowers, fungi, and mosses. Wild animals include roe deer, wild boar, mouflon (a subspecies of wild sheep), fox, badger, hare, Eurasian lynx, wolves, alpine ibex, and small numbers of the Eurasian beaver. The blue cornflower was once a German national symbol.

The 16 national parks in Germany include the Jasmund National Park, the Vorpommern Lagoon Area National Park, the Müritz National Park, the Wadden Sea National Parks, the Harz National Park, the Hainich National Park, the Black Forest National Park, the Saxon Switzerland National Park, the Bavarian Forest National Park and the Berchtesgaden National Park. In addition, there are 17 Biosphere Reserves, and 105 nature parks. More than 400 zoos and animal parks operate in Germany. The Berlin Zoo, which opened in 1844, is the oldest in Germany, and claims the most comprehensive collection of species in the world.

== Politics ==
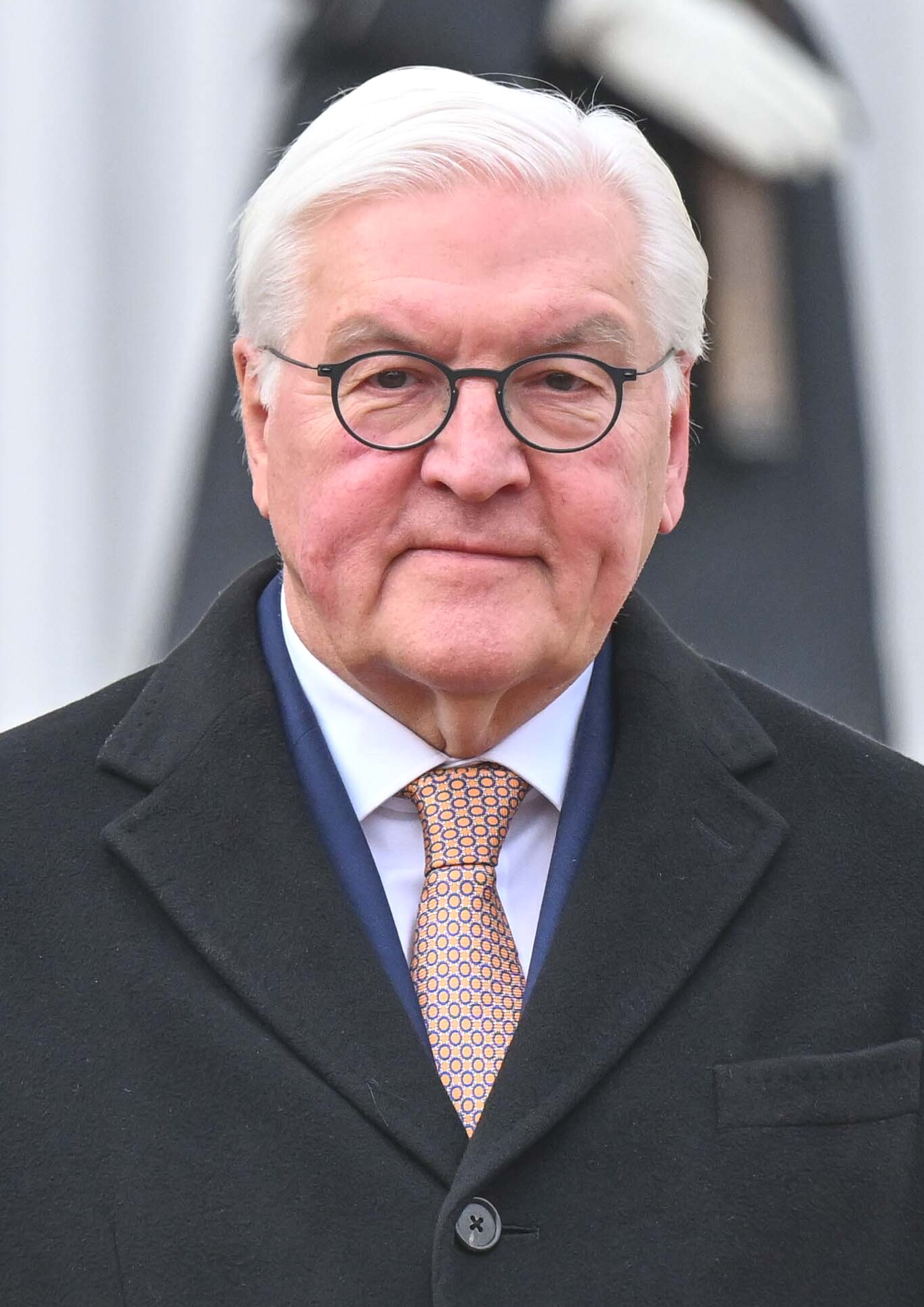
Frank-Walter Steinmeier
President

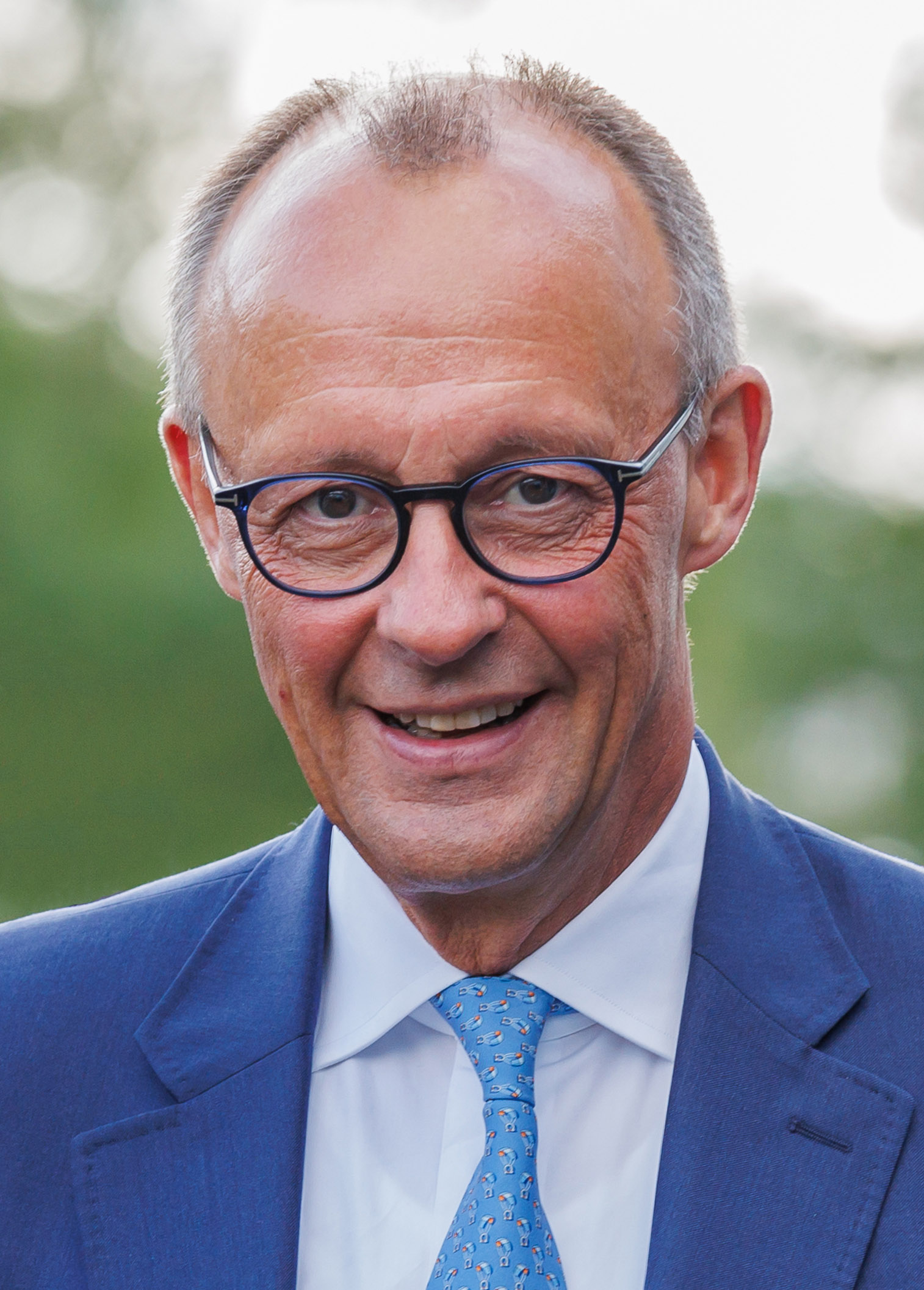
Friedrich Merz
Chancellor

Germany is a federal, parliamentary, representative democratic republic. Federal legislative power is vested in the parliament consisting of the Bundestag (Federal Diet) and Bundesrat (Federal Council), which together form the legislative body. The Bundestag is elected through direct elections using a personalised proportional representation system with a 5% (or 3 seats) threshold. The members of the Bundesrat represent and are appointed by the governments of the sixteen federated states.

The German political system operates under a framework laid out in the 1949 constitution known as the Grundgesetz (Basic Law). Amendments generally require a two-thirds majority of both the Bundestag and the Bundesrat; the fundamental principles of the constitution, as expressed in the articles guaranteeing human dignity, the separation of powers, the federal structure, and the rule of law, are valid in perpetuity.

The president, who has been Frank-Walter Steinmeier since 2017, is the head of state and invested primarily with representative responsibilities and powers. He is elected by the Bundesversammlung (federal convention), an institution consisting of the members of the Bundestag and an equal number of state delegates. The second-highest official in the German order of precedence is the Bundestagspräsident (president of the Bundestag), who is elected by the Bundestag and responsible for overseeing the daily sessions of the body. The third-highest official and the head of government is the chancellor, who is appointed by the Bundespräsident after being elected by the party or coalition with the most seats in the Bundestag. The chancellor, who has been Friedrich Merz since 2025, is the head of government and exercises executive power through his Cabinet.

Since 1949, the party system has been dominated by the centre-right Christian Democratic Union and the centre-left Social Democratic Party. So far every chancellor has been a member of one of these parties. However, the smaller liberal Free Democratic Party and Alliance 90/The Greens have also been junior partners in coalition governments. Since 2007, the democratic socialist party The Left has been a staple in the German Bundestag, as has the far-right Alternative for Germany since 2017.

=== Constituent states ===
Germany is a federation comprising sixteen constituent states referred to as Länder, thirteen of which are so-called "area-states" (Flächenländer). Two states, Berlin and Hamburg, are city-states (Stadtstaaten), in which there is no separation between state government and local administration. The state of Bremen, though officially also called a Stadtstaat, consists of the cities of Bremen, for which the state government also serves as the municipal administration, and the exclave of Bremerhaven.

Each state (Land) has its own constitution and is largely autonomous in its organisation. As of 2017, Germany is divided into 401 districts (Kreise) at a municipal level; these consist of 294 rural districts and 107 urban districts.

State	Capital	Area		Population (census 2022)	Nominal GDP		Nominal GDP per capita EUR (2023)
State	Capital	km^{2}	mi^{2}	Population (census 2022)	Billions EUR (2023)	Share of GDP (%)	Nominal GDP per capita EUR (2023)
Baden-Württemberg	Stuttgart	35,751	13,804	11,104,040	615.071	14.92	54,339
Bavaria	Munich	70,550	27,240	13,038,724	768.469	18.65	57,343
Berlin	Berlin	892	344	3,596,999	193.219	4.69	51,209
Brandenburg	Potsdam	29,654	11,449	2,534,075	97.477	2.37	37,814
Bremen	Bremen	420	162	693,204	39.252	0.95	56,981
Hamburg	Hamburg	755	292	1,808,846	150.575	3.65	79,176
Hesse	Wiesbaden	21,115	8,153	6,207,278	351.139	8.52	54,806
Mecklenburg-Vorpommern	Schwerin	23,214	8,963	1,570,817	59.217	1.44	36,335
Lower Saxony	Hanover	47,593	18,376	7,943,265	363.109	8.81	44,531
North Rhine-Westphalia	Düsseldorf	34,113	13,171	17,890,489	839.084	20.36	46,194
Rhineland-Palatinate	Mainz	19,854	7,666	4,094,169	174.249	4.23	41,797
Saarland	Saarbrücken	2,569	992	1,006,864	41.348	1.00	41,617
Saxony	Dresden	18,416	7,110	4,038,131	155.982	3.78	38,143
Saxony-Anhalt	Magdeburg	20,452	7,897	2,146,443	78.38	1.90	35,911
Schleswig-Holstein	Kiel	15,802	6,101	2,927,542	118.68	2.88	40,090
Thuringia	Erfurt	16,202	6,256	2,110,396	75.909	1.84	35,715
Germany	Berlin	357,386	137,988	82,719,540	4,121.16	100	48,750

=== Law ===
Germany has a civil law system based on Roman law with some references to Germanic law. The Bundesverfassungsgericht (Federal Constitutional Court) is the German Supreme Court responsible for constitutional matters, with power of judicial review. Germany's specialised supreme court system includes the Federal Court of Justice for civil and criminal cases, along with the Federal Labour Court, Federal Social Court, Federal Fiscal Court, and Federal Administrative Court for other matters.

Criminal and private laws are codified on the national level in the Strafgesetzbuch and the Bürgerliches Gesetzbuch respectively. The German penal system seeks the rehabilitation of the criminal and the protection of the public. With the exceptions of petty crimes, tried by a single professional judge, and of serious political crimes, all charges are adjudicated by mixed tribunals where lay judges (Schöffen) and professional judges preside together.

In 2016, Germany's murder rate stood at a low of 1.18 murders per 100,000. In 2018, the overall crime rate in the country fell to its lowest since 1992, while in 2024, it was reported that violent crime reached a 15-year high, with overall crime rising as well.

Same-sex marriage in Germany has been legal since 2017, and LGBT rights in the country are generally protected.

=== Foreign relations ===
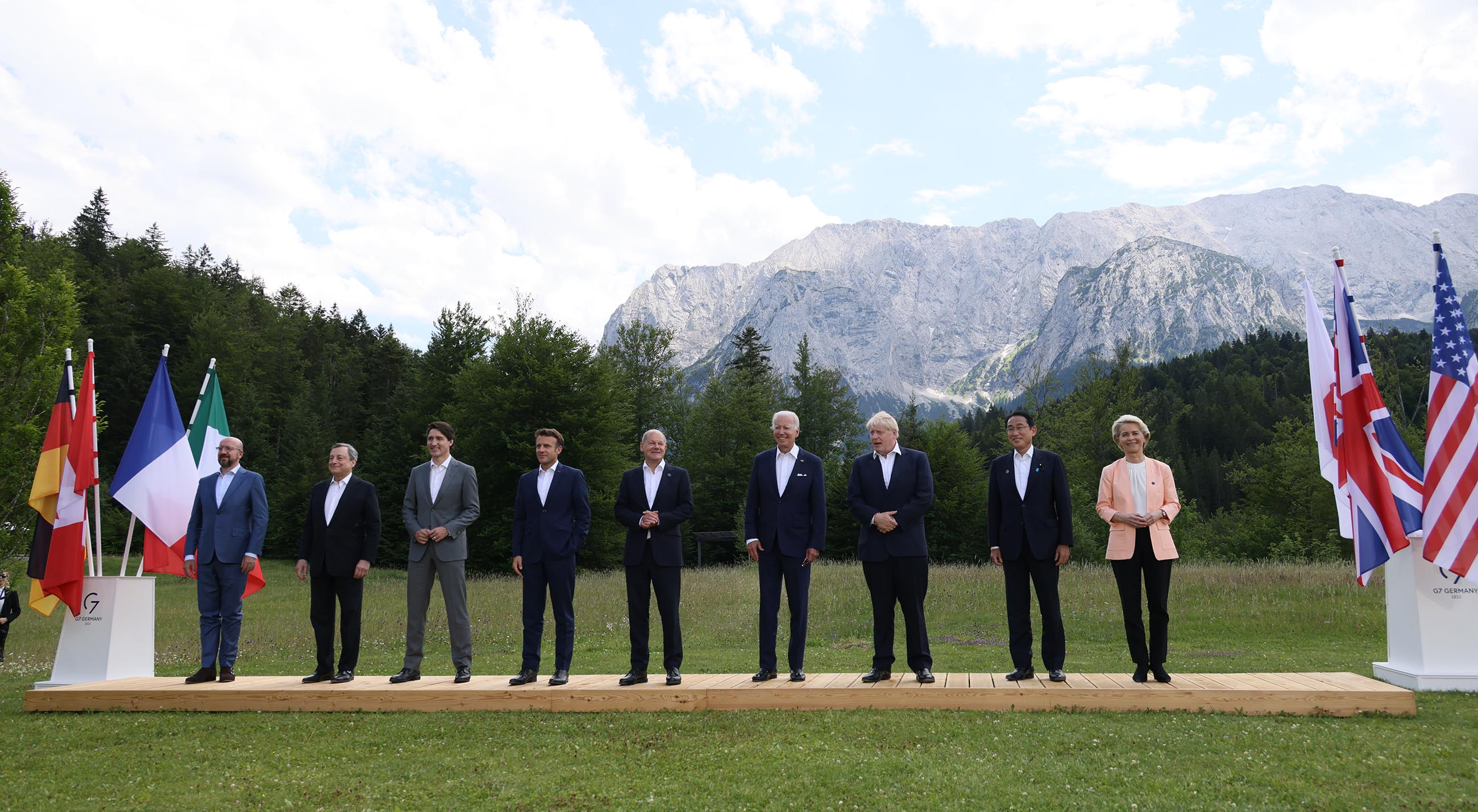
Germany hosted the 2022 G7 summit at Schloss Elmau in Bavaria.

Germany has a network of 227 diplomatic missions abroad and maintains relations with more than 190 countries. Germany is a member of the Council of Europe, NATO, the OECD, the G7, the G20, the World Bank and the IMF. Germany has played an influential role in the European Union since its inception and has maintained a strong alliance with France and all neighbouring countries since 1990. Germany promotes the creation of a more unified European political, economic and security apparatus. Because of its economic power and political influence, Germany is widely considered to be a great power.

The governments of Germany and the United States are close political allies. Cultural ties and economic interests have crafted a bond between the two countries resulting in Atlanticism.

Germany's development policy functions as a distinct sector within its foreign policy framework. It is formulated by the Federal Ministry for Economic Cooperation and Development and carried out by the implementing organisations. The German government sees development policy as a joint responsibility of the international community. Germany was the world's second-biggest aid donor in 2019 after the United States.

=== Military ===
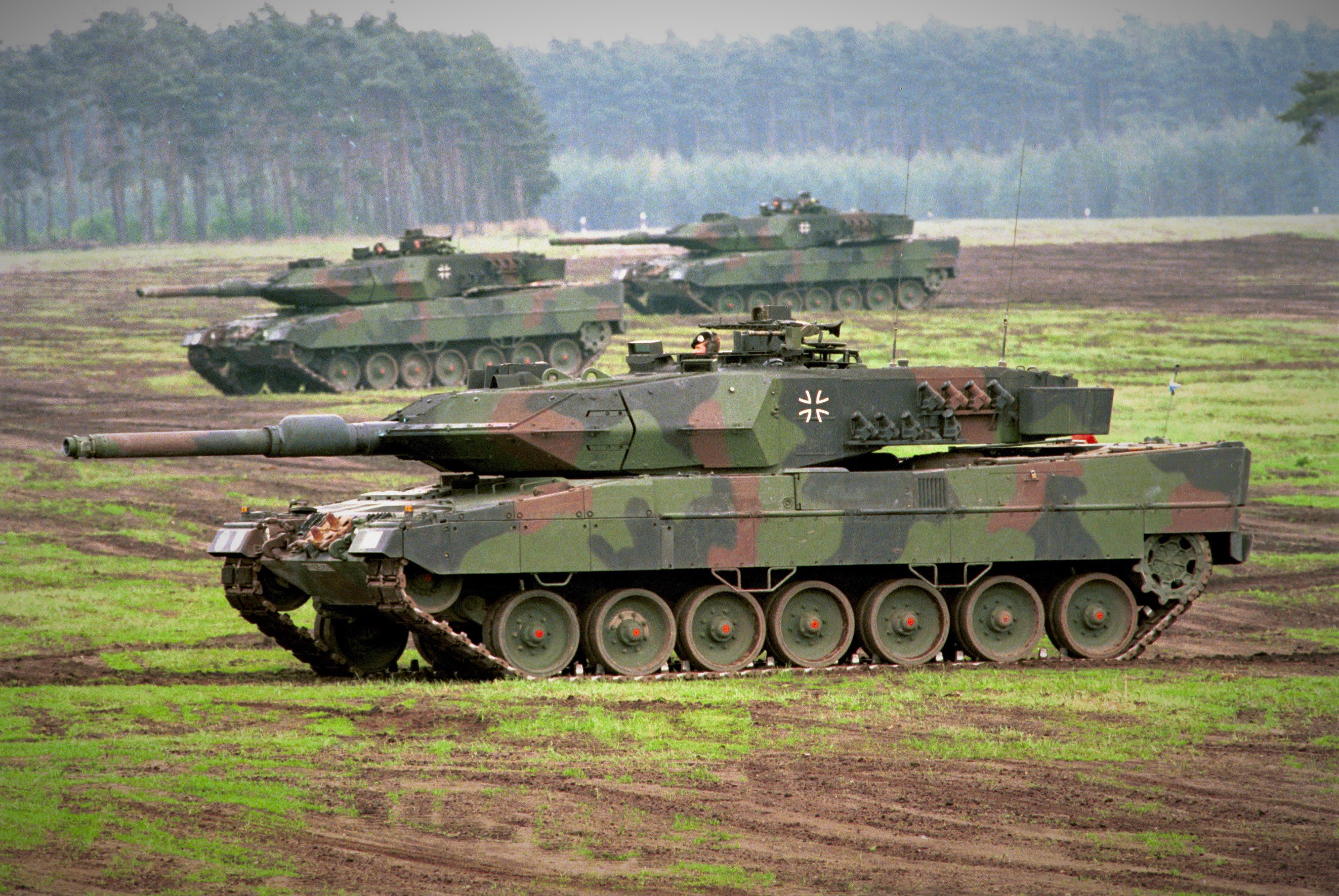
Leopard 2 battle tanks of the German Army

Germany's military, the Bundeswehr (Federal Defence), is organised into the Heer (Army and special forces KSK), Marine (Navy), Luftwaffe (Air Force) and Cyber- und Informationsraum (Cyber and Information Domain Service) branches. In absolute terms, German military spending in 2025 was the fourth-highest in the world. In response to the 2022 Russian invasion of Ukraine, Chancellor Olaf Scholz announced that German military expenditure would be increased past the NATO target of 2%, along with a one-time 2022 infusion of 100 billion euros, representing almost double the 53 billion euro military budget for 2021. In 2023, military spending according to NATO criteria amounted to $73.1 billion, or 1.64% of the country's GDP, well below the NATO target of 2%. In 2026, Germany reported an estimated spending of $147.002 billion to NATO, exceeding said target at 2.69% of GDP.

As of May 2024, the Bundeswehr has a strength of 180,215 active soldiers and 80,761 civilians. Reservists are available to the armed forces and participate in defence exercises and deployments abroad. Until 2011, military service was compulsory for men at age 18, but this has been officially suspended and replaced with a voluntary service. Since 2001 women may serve in all functions of service without restriction. According to the Stockholm International Peace Research Institute, Germany was the fourth-largest exporter of major arms in the world between 2021 and 2025.

In peacetime, the Bundeswehr is commanded by the Minister of Defence. In a state of defence, the Chancellor would become commander-in-chief of the Bundeswehr. The role of the Bundeswehr is described in the Constitution of Germany as defensive only. But after a ruling of the Federal Constitutional Court in 1994, the term "defence" has been defined not only to include protection of the borders of Germany, but also crisis reaction and conflict prevention, or more broadly as guarding the security of Germany anywhere in the world. As of 2026, the German military has about 3,000 troops stationed in foreign countries including 1,800 in Lithuania and nearby countries, about 300 in Kosovo, 300 in Iraq and Jordan, and 200 in Lebanon.

== Economy ==
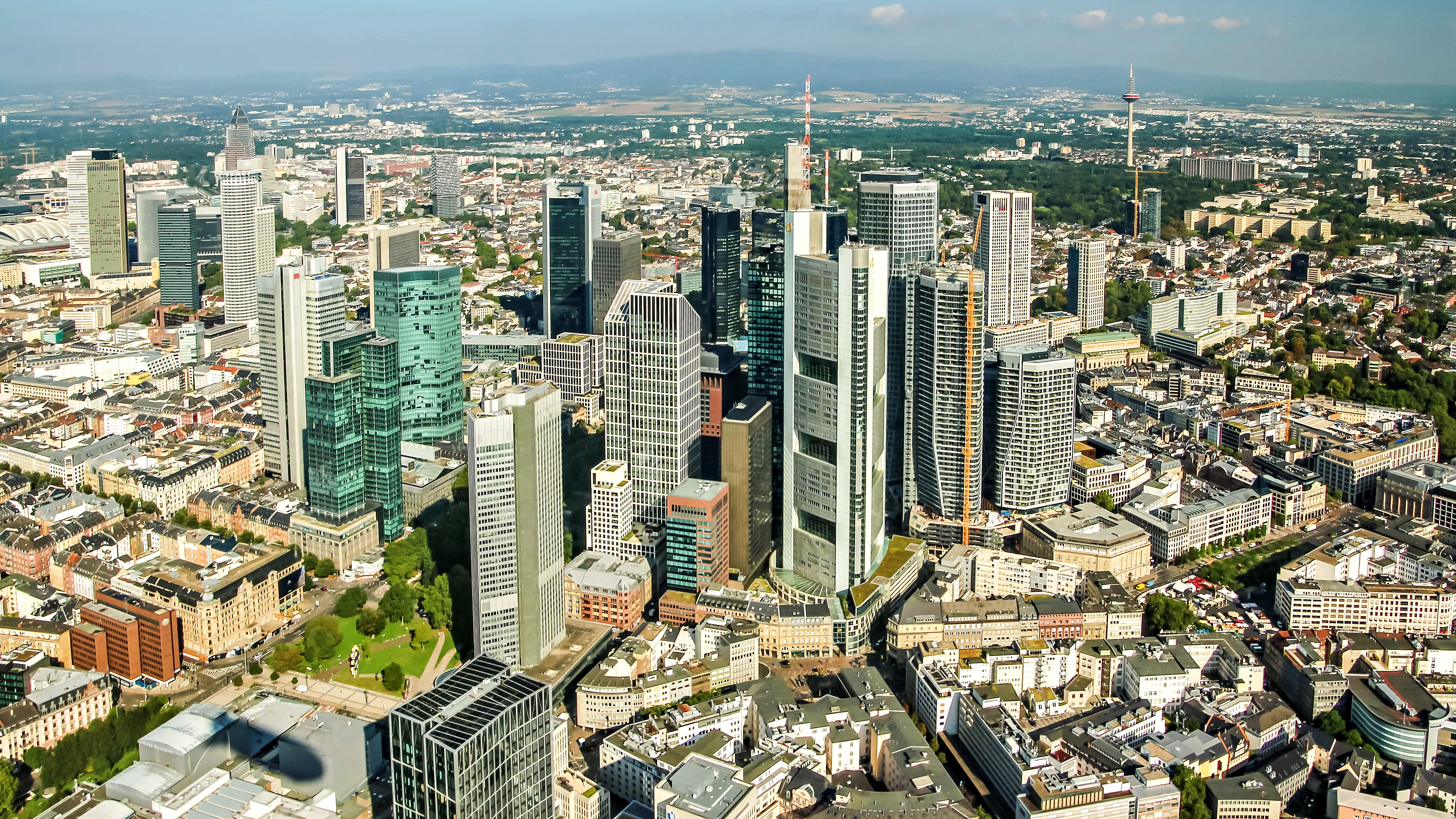
Frankfurt, a leading business and financial centre in Europe and the seat of the European Central Bank

Germany has a social market economy with a highly skilled labour force, a low level of corruption, and a high level of innovation. It is the largest economy in Europe by nominal GDP, as well as the world's third-largest by nominal GDP and sixth-largest by PPP-adjusted GDP. Its PPP-adjusted GDP per capita amounted to 115% of the EU average in 2024. The country's service sector contributes approximately 72% of the total GDP, the industrial sector 27%—with Germany having the largest manufacturing output in Europe—and its agricultural sector 1%, as of 2023. The unemployment rate published by Eurostat amounts to 3.2% as of January 2020, which is the fourth-lowest in the EU.

Germany is part of the European single market which represents more than 450 million consumers. In 2017, the country accounted for 28% of the eurozone economy according to the International Monetary Fund. Germany introduced the common EU currency, the euro, in 2002. Its monetary policy is set by the European Central Bank, which is based in Frankfurt, the country's largest financial centre. Germany is the world's third-largest exporter and third-largest importer, and it has the second-largest trade surplus after China. Its largest trading partners in 2025 were China, the United States and the Netherlands. Germany's main exports are vehicles, machinery, and chemical goods.

The German automotive industry is among the most competitive and innovative in the world. It was the sixth-largest by production and largest by export value in 2023. Germany is home to Volkswagen Group, the world's second-largest automotive manufacturer by vehicle production.

Of the world's 500 largest stock market-listed companies by revenue in 2024, the Fortune Global 500, 29 were based in Germany. The DAX, Germany's stock market index operated by the Frankfurt Stock Exchange, includes 30 major Germany-based companies. Prominent German companies include Mercedes-Benz, BMW, Volkswagen, Audi, Porsche, Siemens, Adidas, SAP, Bosch and BASF. Berlin is a hub for startup companies and has become the leading location for venture capital-funded firms in Europe. Germany is recognised for its large portion of specialised small and medium enterprises known as the Mittelstand; these companies represent around 48% of the global market leaders in their segments, labelled hidden champions.

Research and development efforts form an integral part of the German economy, with the country ranking fourth in research and development expenditure since 2005. In 2018, Germany ranked fourth globally in terms of number of science and engineering research papers published and third in the quality-adjusted Nature Index in 2023. Well-known research institutions in Germany include the Max Planck Society, the Helmholtz Association, the Fraunhofer Society, and the Leibniz Association. Germany is the largest contributor to the European Space Agency. The country was ranked 11th in the Global Innovation Index in 2025.

=== Infrastructure ===
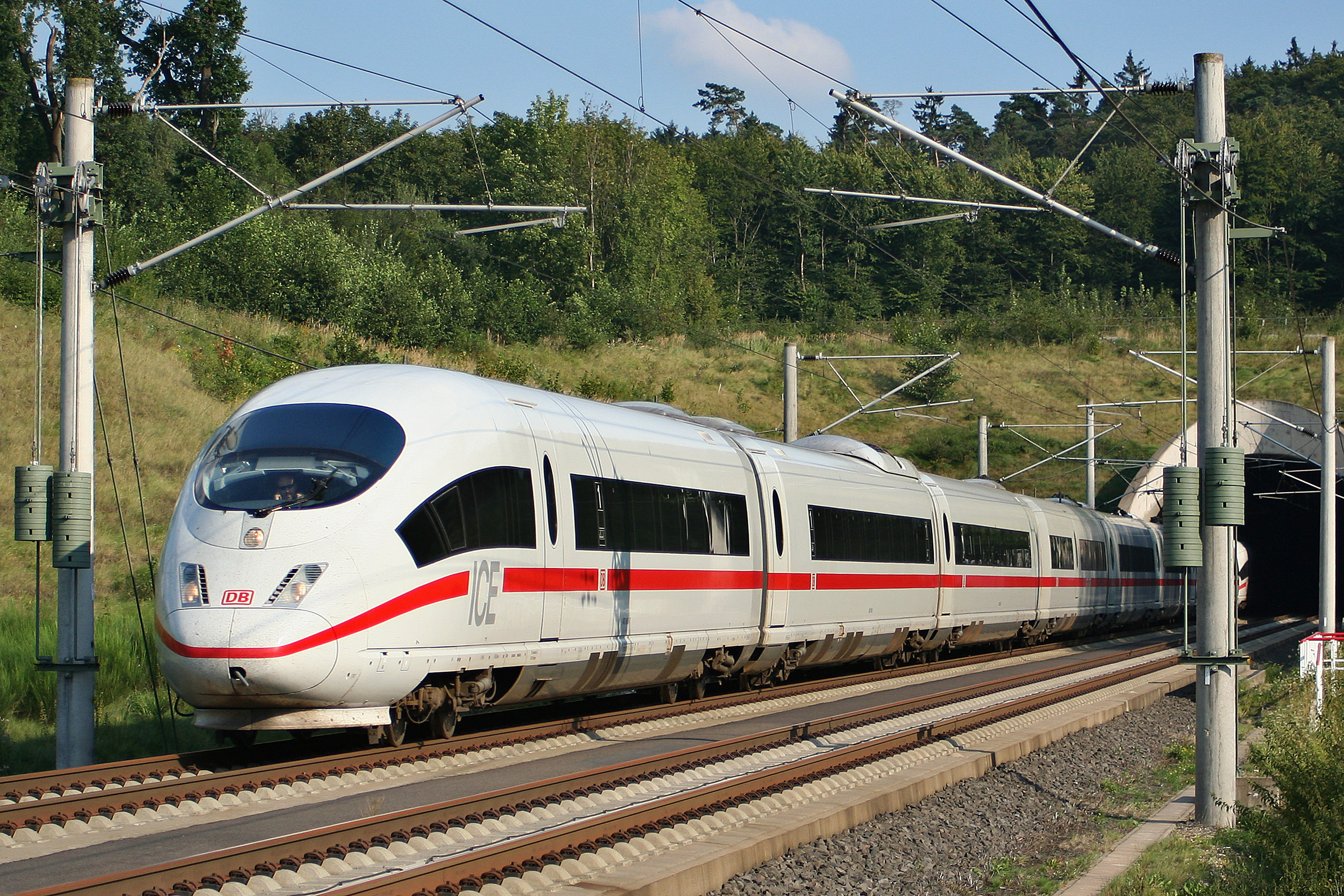
High-speed trains like this ICE 3 connect the whole of Germany.

With its central position in Europe, Germany is a transport hub for the continent. Its road network is among the densest in Europe. The motorway (Autobahn) is widely known for having no general federally mandated speed limit for some classes of vehicles. The Intercity Express or ICE train network serves major German cities as well as destinations in neighbouring countries with speeds up to 300 km/h (190 mph). The largest German airports are Frankfurt Airport, Munich Airport and Berlin Brandenburg Airport. The Port of Hamburg is the third-busiest port in Europe and one of the twenty largest container ports in the world.

In 2019, Germany was the world's seventh-largest consumer of energy. All German nuclear power plants were phased out in 2023. Germany meets its power demands using 40% renewable sources (2018), and has been called an "early leader" in solar panels and offshore wind. The German energy transition (Energiewende) is the recognised move to a sustainable economy by means of energy efficiency and renewable energy, with the country being called "the world's first major renewable energy economy". Germany has reduced its primary energy consumption by 11% between 1990 and 2015 and set itself goals of reducing it by 30% until 2030 and 50% by 2050.

The country is committed to the Paris Agreement and several other treaties promoting biodiversity, low emission standards, and water management. As of 2017, Germany's household recycling rate is among the highest in the world, at around 65%. In 2023, Germany was the 14th highest emitting nation of greenhouse gases.

=== Tourism ===
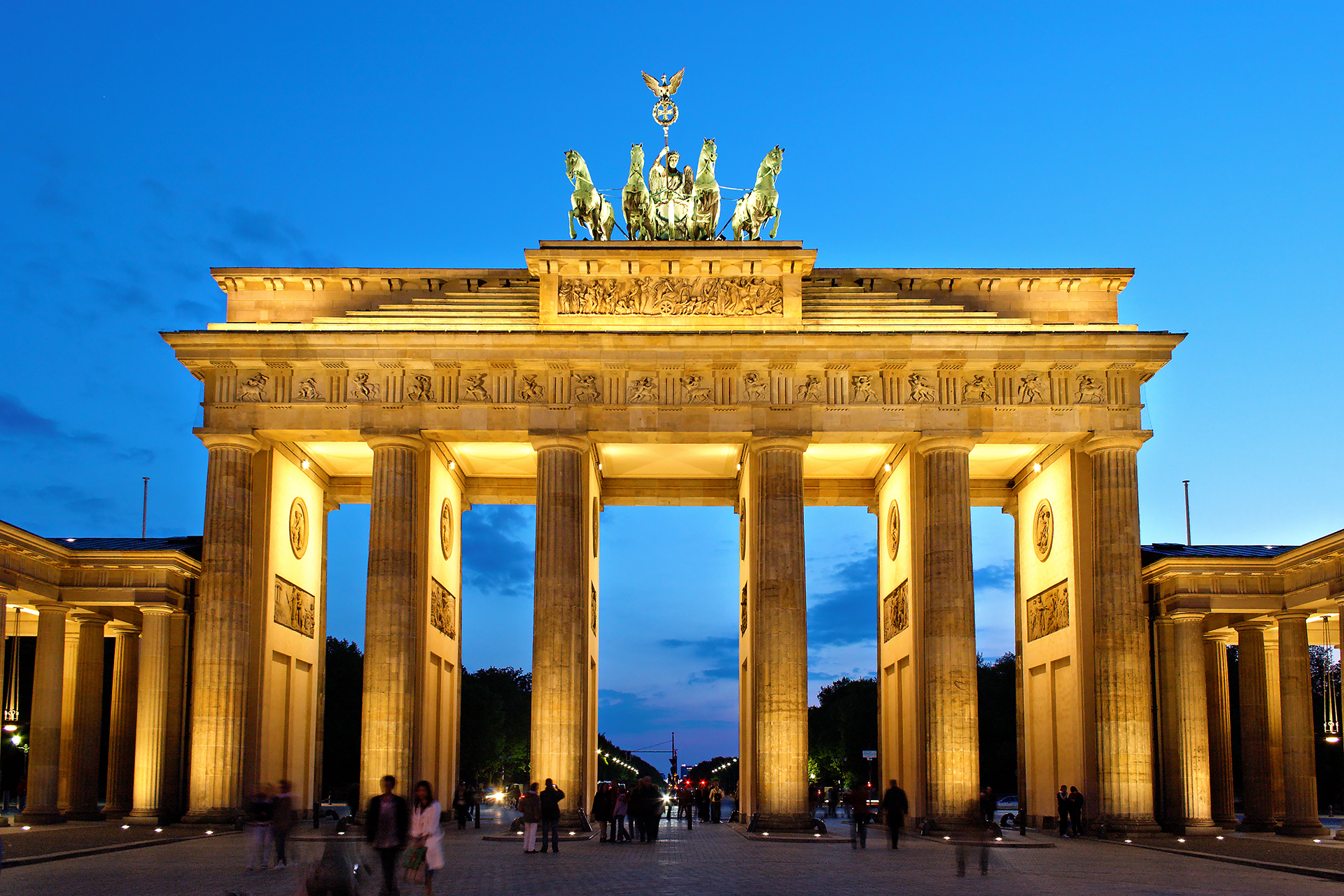
The Brandenburg Gate in Berlin

Domestic and international travel and tourism directly contributed over €105.3 billion to German GDP in 2015. Including indirect and induced impacts, the industry supported nearly 4.2 million jobs in 2015. As of 2024, Germany is the seventh-most-visited country. Its most popular landmarks include Cologne Cathedral, the Brandenburg Gate, the Reichstag, the Dresden Frauenkirche, Neuschwanstein Castle, Heidelberg Castle, the Wartburg, and Sanssouci Palace. Europa-Park near Freiburg is Europe's second-most popular theme park resort.

== Demographics ==
With a population of 84.7 million according to the 2023 German census, Germany is the most populous member state of the European Union, the second-most populous country in Europe (Note: Excluding Turkey, which only has around 3% of its territory and 10% of its population in Europe) after Russia, and the nineteenth-most populous country in the world. Its population density stands at 236 inhabitants per square kilometre (610 inhabitants/mi^{2}). The fertility rate of 1.36 children born per woman (2024 estimates) is below the replacement rate of 2.1, but slightly above the EU average of 1.34. Since the 1970s, Germany's death rate has exceeded its birth rate. However, the country is witnessing increased birth and migration rates since the early 2010s. Germany has the fourth oldest population in the world, with an average age of 47.8 years.

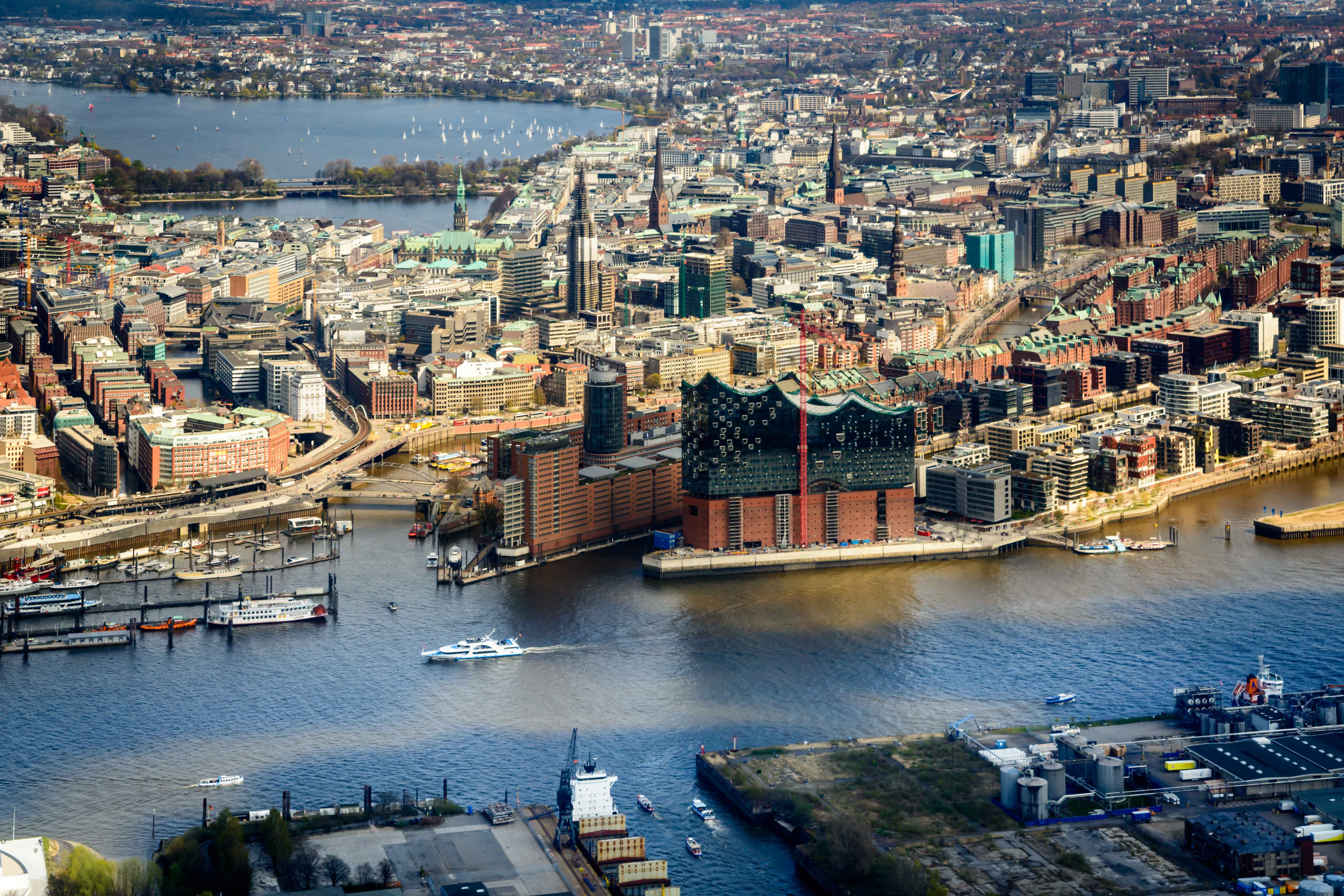
Hamburg is Germany's second-most populous city, with its seaport being the country's largest by volume.

Four sizeable groups of people are referred to as national minorities because their ancestors have lived in their respective regions for centuries: There is a Danish minority in the northernmost state of Schleswig-Holstein; the Sorbs, a Slavic population, are in the Lusatia region of Saxony and Brandenburg; the Roma and Sinti live throughout the country; and the Frisians are concentrated in Schleswig-Holstein's western coast and in the north-western part of Lower Saxony.

Germany is a major destination for immigrants, ranking second in the world after the United States. In 2015, following the 2015 refugee crisis, the Population Division of the United Nations Department of Economic and Social Affairs listed Germany as host to the second-highest number of international migrants worldwide, about 5% or 12 million of all 244 million migrants. Refugee crises have resulted in substantial population increases; for example, the major influx of Ukrainian immigrants following the 2022 Russian invasion of Ukraine, whereby over 1.06 million refugees from Ukraine were recorded in Germany as of April 2023. In 2019, Germany ranked seventh among EU countries in terms of the percentage of migrants in the country's population, at 13.1%. In 2022, there were 23.8 million people—28.7 percent of the total population—who had a migration background.

Germany has over 2,000 cities and towns, and 11 officially recognised metropolitan regions. The country's most populous city is Berlin, and its largest urban area is the Ruhr.

Largest cities or towns in Germany Federal Statistical Office of Germany - Destatis (census 2022)
Rank	Name	State	Pop.	Rank	Name	State	Pop.
1	Berlin	Berlin	3,685,265	11	Essen	North Rhine-Westphalia	571,039
2	Hamburg	Hamburg	1,862,565	12	Dresden	Saxony	557,782
3	Munich	Bavaria	1,478,638	13	Nuremberg	Bavaria	522,554
4	Cologne	North Rhine-Westphalia	1,017,355	14	Hanover	Lower Saxony	513,291
5	Frankfurt	Hesse	743,268	15	Duisburg	North Rhine-Westphalia	501,415
6	Düsseldorf	North Rhine-Westphalia	611,258	16	Wuppertal	North Rhine-Westphalia	356,768
7	Stuttgart	Baden-Württemberg	610,458	17	Bochum	North Rhine-Westphalia	354,288
8	Leipzig	Saxony	598,899	18	Bielefeld	North Rhine-Westphalia	330,072
9	Dortmund	North Rhine-Westphalia	598,246	19	Bonn	North Rhine-Westphalia	321,544
10	Bremen	Bremen	575,071	20	Mannheim	Baden-Württemberg	313,693

=== Languages ===
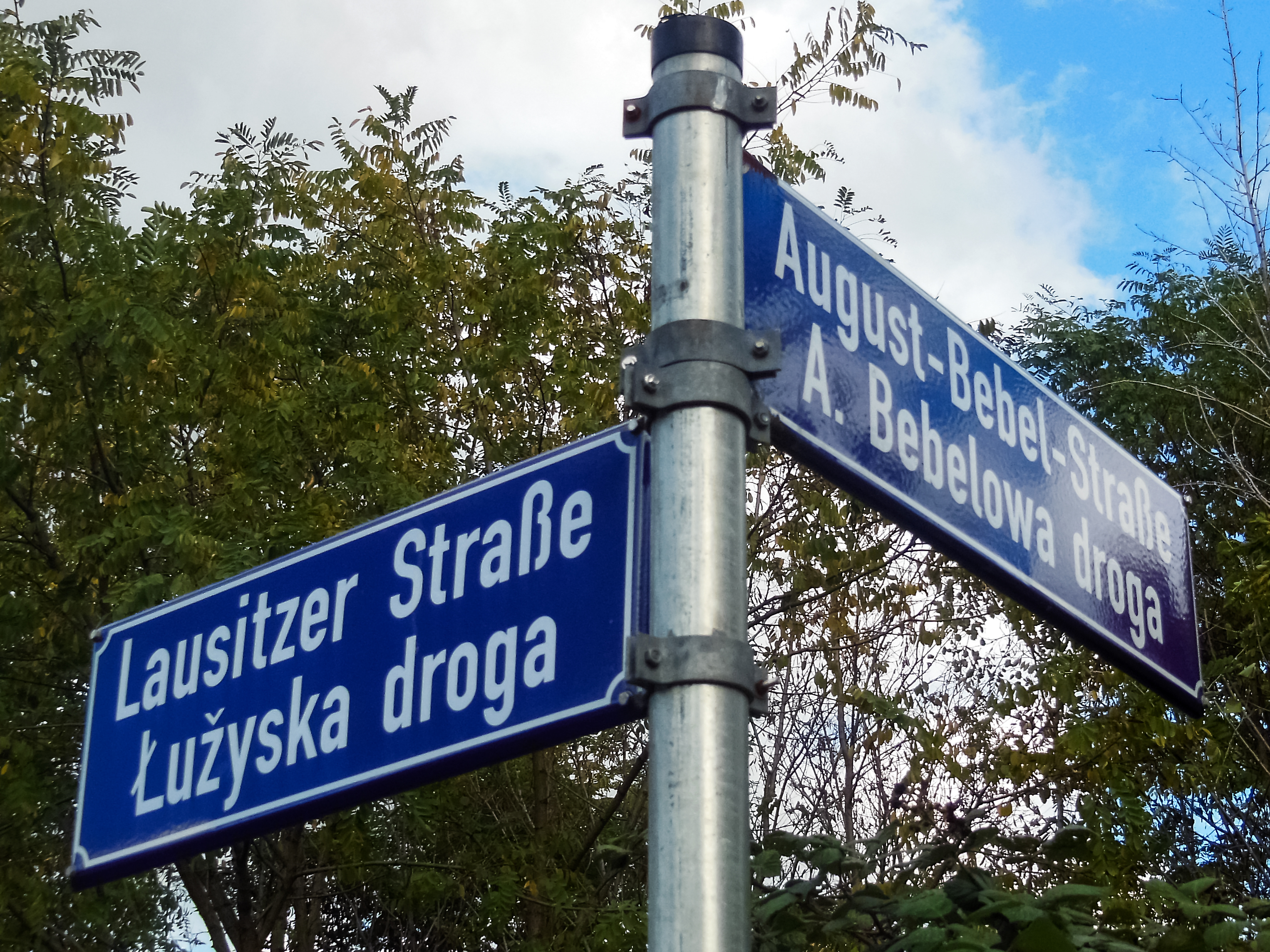
A bilingual street sign in both German and Lower Sorbian in Cottbus (Chóśebuz), Brandenburg

German is the official and predominantly spoken language in Germany. It is one of 24 official and working languages of the European Union, and one of the three procedural languages of the European Commission, alongside English and French. German is the most widely spoken first language in the European Union, with around 100 million native speakers.

Recognised native minority languages in Germany are Danish, Low German, Low Rhenish, Sorbian, Romani, North Frisian and Saterland Frisian; they are officially protected by the European Charter for Regional or Minority Languages. The most used immigrant languages are Turkish, Arabic, Kurdish, Polish, Italian, Greek, Spanish, Serbo-Croatian, Bulgarian and other Balkan languages, as well as Russian. Germans are typically multilingual: 74% of German citizens claim to be able to communicate in at least one foreign language and 35% in at least two.

=== Religion ===
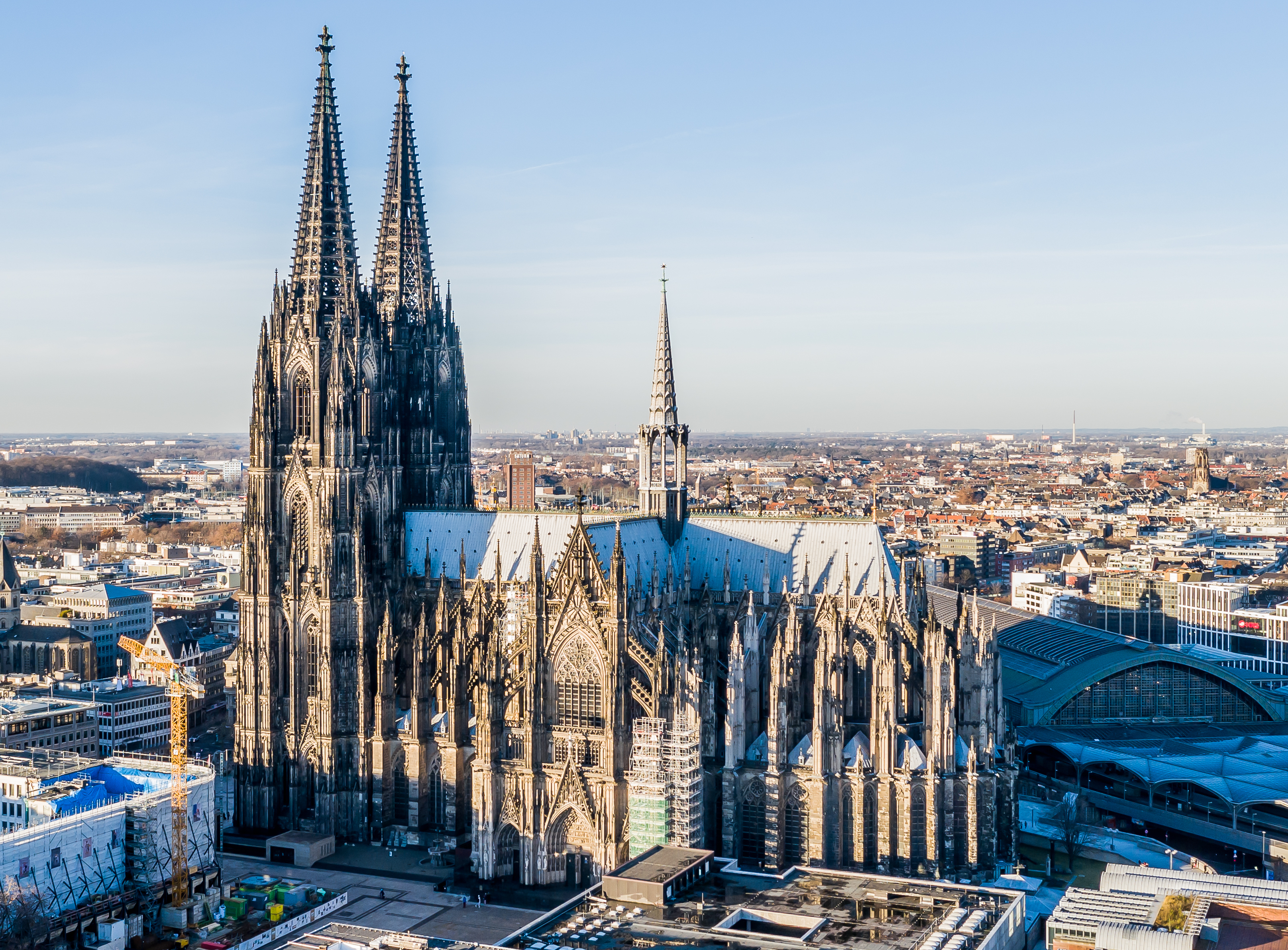
Cologne Cathedral, a UNESCO World Heritage Site

According to the 2022 census, Christianity is the largest religion in Germany at 49.7% of the population; 23.1% identified as Protestant and 25.1% as Catholic.

A study, based primarily on church membership rolls, estimated that in 2025 48.1% of the population are not members of any religious organisation or denomination and 46.3% are Christians. Irreligion in Germany is strongest in major metropolitan areas and throughout the former East Germany.

Islam is the second-largest religion in the country. In the 2011 census, 1.9% of respondents (1.52 million people) gave their religion as Islam, but this figure is deemed unreliable because a disproportionate number of adherents of this faith (and other religions, such as Judaism) are likely to have made use of their right not to answer the question. In 2019, there were an estimated 5.3–5.6 million Muslims with a migrant background (Note: A migrant background is defined as having been born or having at least one parent born in a country from a prespecified list of countries with a significant Muslim population, or as having citizenship or at least one parent with citizenship of one of these countries.) (6.4–6.7% of the population), in addition to an unknown number of Muslims without a migrant background. Most of the Muslims are Sunnis and Alevis from Turkey, but there are a small number of Shi'ites, Ahmadiyyas and other denominations. Other religions each comprise less than one percent of Germany's population.

In 2011, formal members of the Jewish community represented no more than 0.2% of the total German population, and 60% of them resided in Berlin. An estimated 80 to 90 percent of these Jews in Germany are Russian-speaking immigrants from the former Soviet Union who came to Germany from the 1980s onwards.

=== Education ===
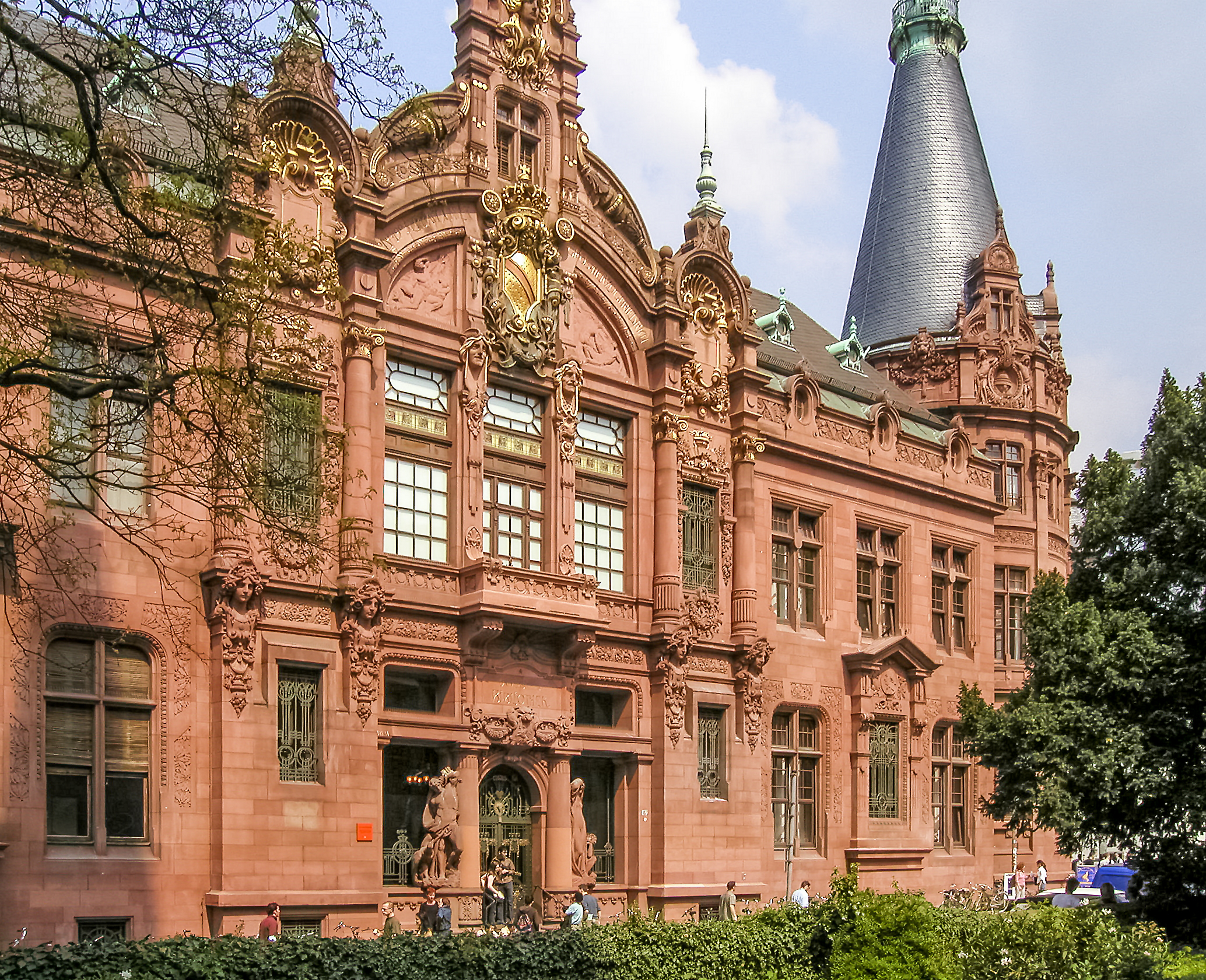
Heidelberg University, Germany's oldest institution of higher learning and generally considered one of its most renowned

Responsibility for educational supervision in Germany is primarily organised within the individual states. Optional kindergarten education is provided for all children between three and six years old, after which school attendance is compulsory for at least nine years depending on the state. Primary education usually lasts for four to six years. Secondary schooling is divided into tracks based on whether students pursue academic or vocational education. A system of apprenticeship called Duale Ausbildung leads to a skilled qualification which is almost comparable to an academic degree. It allows students in vocational training to learn in a company as well as in a state-run trade school. This model is well regarded and reproduced all around the world.

Most of the German universities are public institutions, and students traditionally study without fee payment. The general requirement for attending university is the Abitur. According to an OECD report from 2014, Germany is the world's third leading destination for international study. The established universities in Germany include some of the oldest in the world, with Heidelberg University (established in 1386), Leipzig University (established in 1409) and the University of Rostock (established in 1419) being the oldest in the country. The Humboldt University of Berlin, founded in 1810 by the liberal educational reformer Wilhelm von Humboldt, became the academic model for many Western universities.

=== Health ===
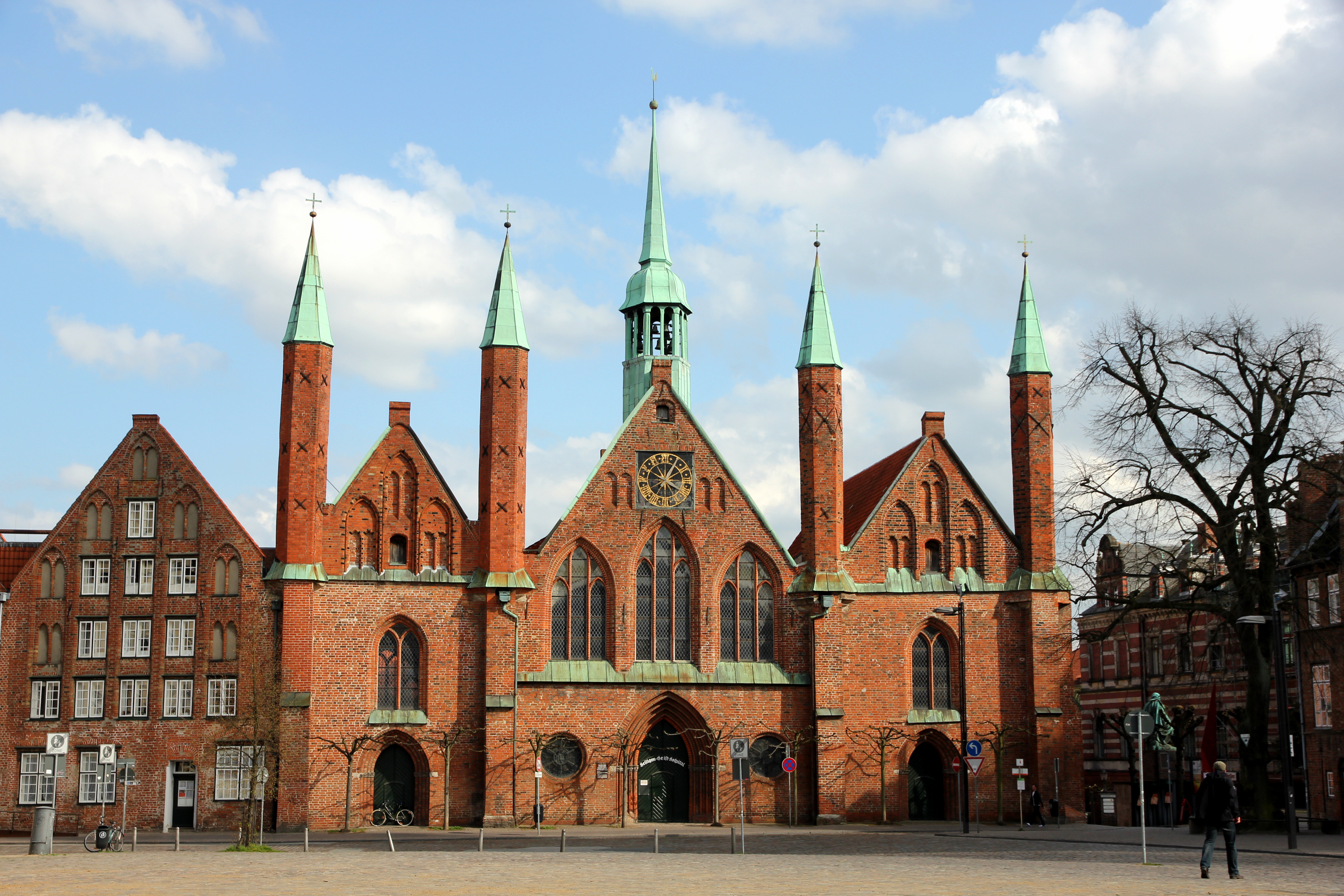
The Hospital of the Holy Spirit in Lübeck, established in 1286, is a precursor to modern hospitals.

Germany's system of hospitals, called Krankenhäuser, dates from medieval times, and the country has the world's oldest universal health care system, dating from Bismarck's social legislation of the 1880s. Since the 1880s, reforms and provisions have ensured a balanced health care system. The population is covered by a health insurance plan provided by statute, with criteria allowing some groups to opt for a private health insurance contract. According to the World Health Organization (WHO), Germany's health care system was 77% government-funded and 23% privately funded in 2013. In 2024, Germany spent 12.27% of its GDP on health care.

Germany ranked 21st in the world in 2019 in life expectancy with 78.7 years for men and 84.8 years for women according to the WHO, and it had a very low infant mortality rate of 4 deaths per 1,000 live births. In 2019, the principal cause of death was cardiovascular disease, at 37%. Obesity in Germany has been increasingly cited as a major health issue: a 2014 study showed that 52 percent of the adult German population was overweight or obese.

Germany has an extensive psychiatric care system, with rising demand for mental health services; roughly 27.8% of adults experience a mental disorder annually. While the system offers comprehensive, insurance-covered care, it faces a shortage of psychotherapists and a pandemic-driven surge in anxiety and depression. In 2023, 37.7% of adults rated their mental health as excellent or very good. Germany had the third-highest rate of chronic depression among EU countries in 2019.

== Culture ==
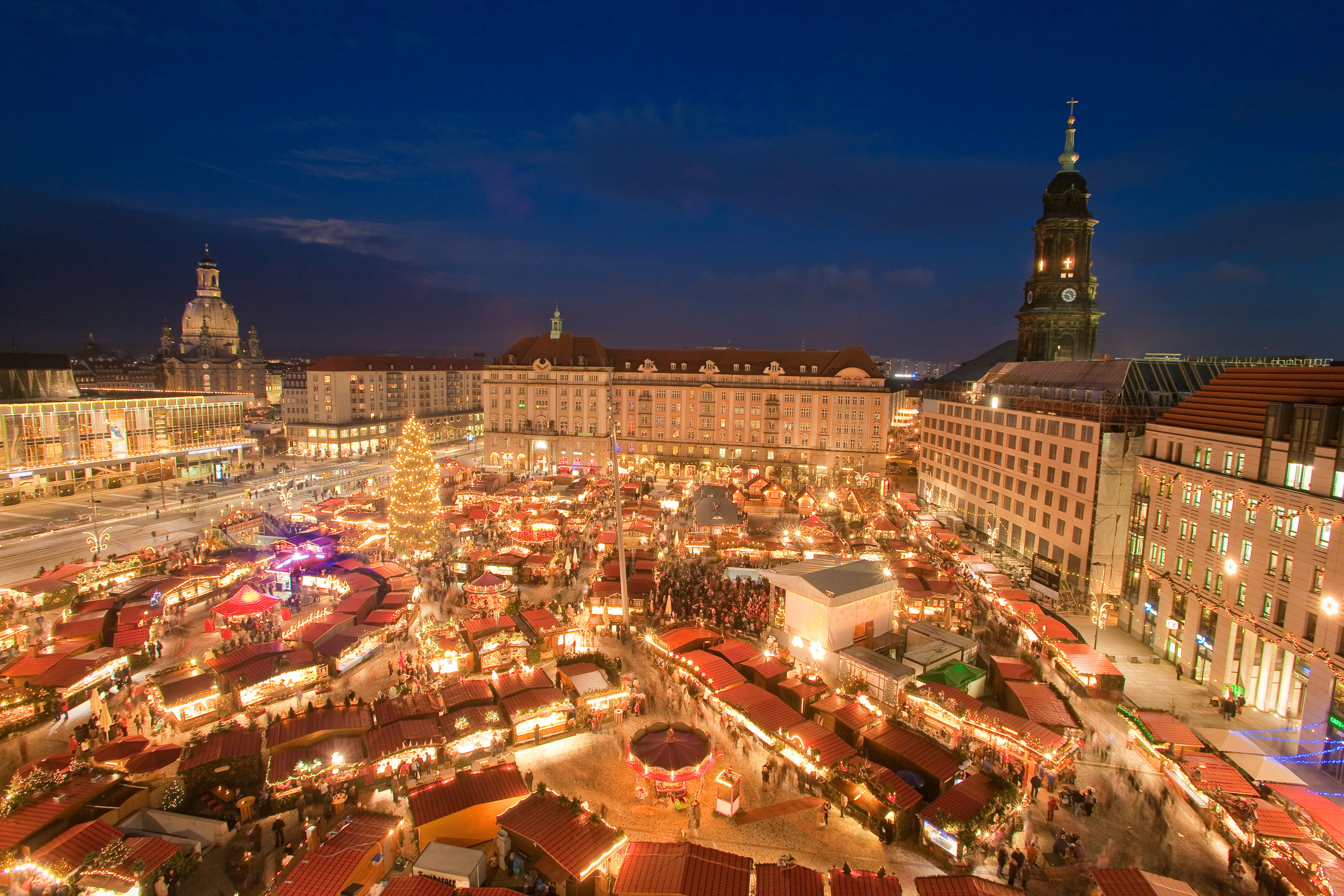
The Striezelmarkt, a Christmas market in Dresden

Culture in German states has been shaped by major intellectual and popular currents in Europe, both religious and secular, and German scientists, writers and philosophers have played a significant role in the development of Western thought. Global opinion polls from the BBC revealed that Germany is recognised for having the most positive influence in the world in 2013 and 2014.

Germany is well known for such folk festivals as the Oktoberfest and Christmas customs, which include Advent wreaths, Christmas pageants, Christmas trees, Stollen cakes, and other practices. As of 2025, UNESCO inscribed 55 properties in Germany on the World Heritage List. There are a number of public holidays in Germany determined by each state; 3 October has been a national day of Germany since 1990, celebrated as the Tag der Deutschen Einheit (German Unity Day).

=== Art, design and architecture ===
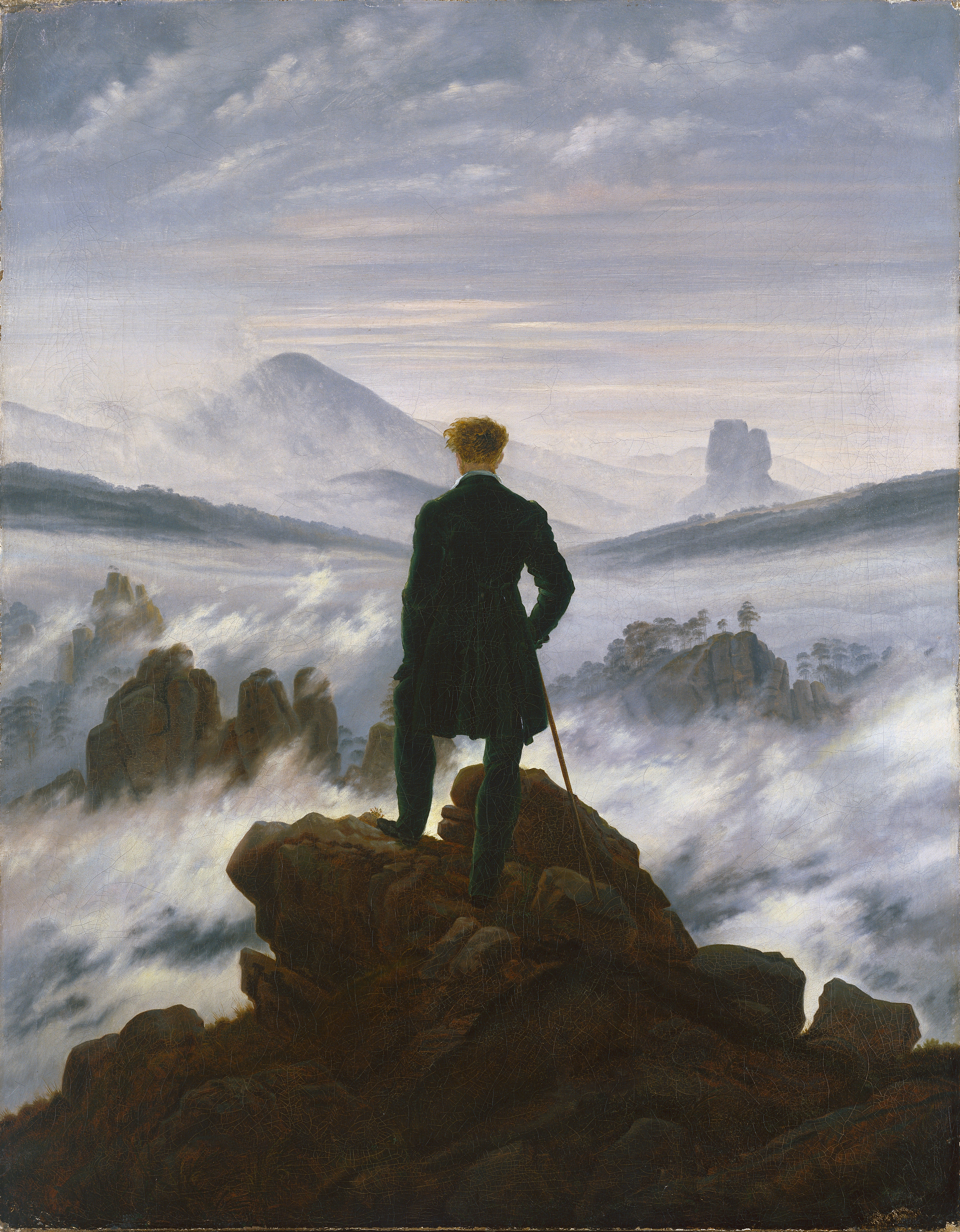
C.D. Friedrich, Wanderer above the Sea of Fog (1818)

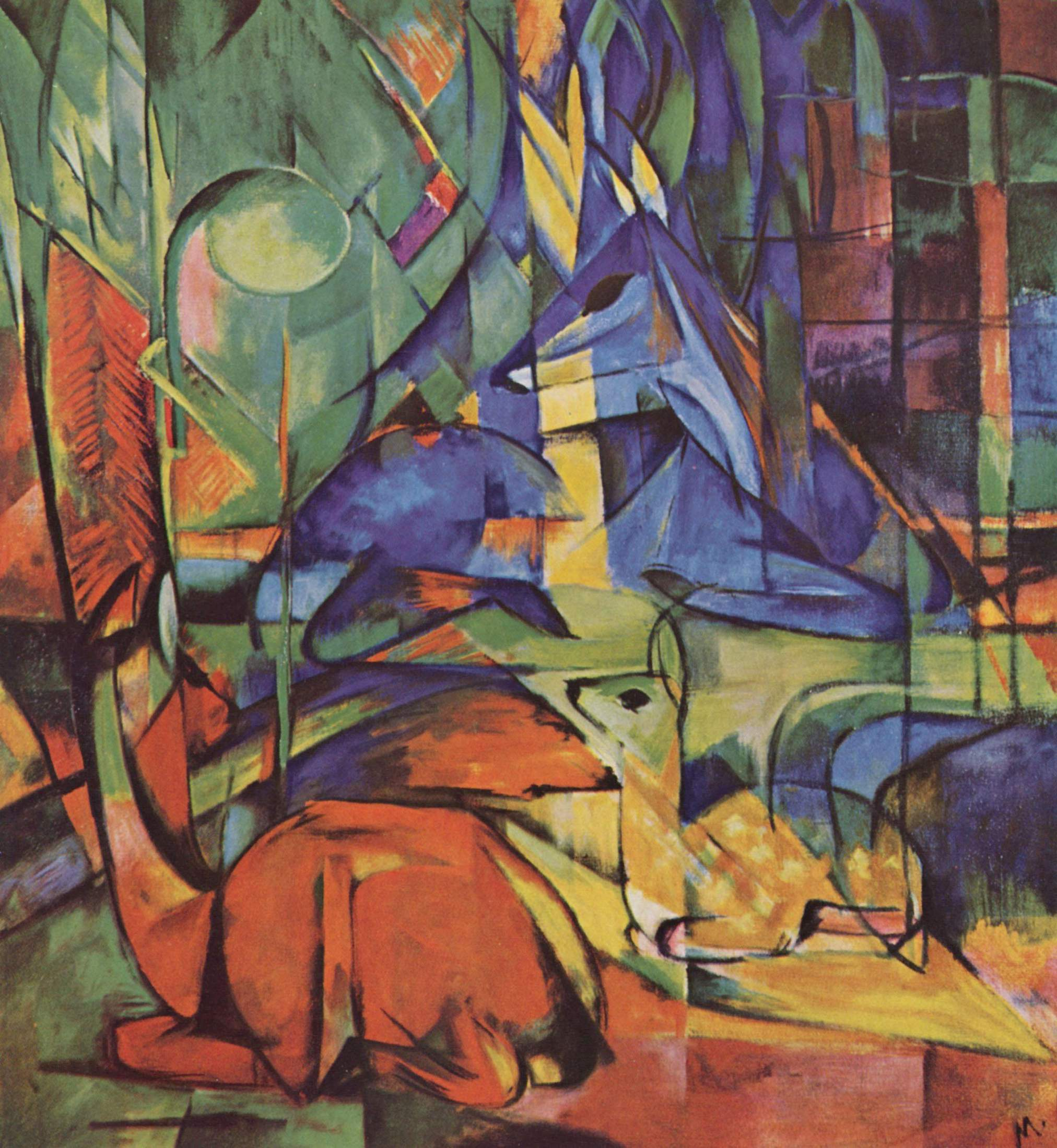
Franz Marc, Roe Deer in the Forest (1914)

German painters have influenced Western art. Albrecht Dürer, Hans Holbein the Younger, Matthias Grünewald and Lucas Cranach the Elder were important German artists of the Renaissance, Johann Baptist Zimmermann of the Baroque, Caspar David Friedrich and Carl Spitzweg of Romanticism, Max Liebermann of Impressionism and Max Ernst of Surrealism. Several German art groups formed in the 20th century; Die Brücke (The Bridge) and Der Blaue Reiter (The Blue Rider) influenced the development of expressionism in Munich and Berlin. The New Objectivity arose in response to expressionism during the Weimar Republic. After World War II, broad trends in German art include neo-expressionism and the New Leipzig School.

German designers became early leaders of modern product design. The Berlin Fashion Week and the fashion trade fair Bread & Butter are held twice a year.

Architectural contributions from Germany include the Carolingian and Ottonian styles, which were precursors of Romanesque. Brick Gothic is a distinctive medieval style that evolved in Germany. Also in Renaissance and Baroque art, regional and typically German elements evolved (e.g. Weser Renaissance). Vernacular architecture in Germany is often identified by its timber framing (Fachwerk) traditions and varies across regions, and among carpentry styles. When industrialisation spread across Europe, classicism and a distinctive style of historicism developed in Germany, sometimes referred to as Gründerzeit style. Expressionist architecture developed in the 1910s in Germany and influenced Art Deco and other modern styles. Germany was particularly important in the early modernist movement: it is the home of Werkbund initiated by Hermann Muthesius (New Objectivity), and of the Bauhaus movement founded by Walter Gropius. Ludwig Mies van der Rohe became one of the world's most renowned architects in the second half of the 20th century; he conceived of the glass façade skyscraper. Renowned contemporary German architects and offices include Pritzker Prize winners Gottfried Böhm and Frei Otto.

=== Literature and philosophy ===
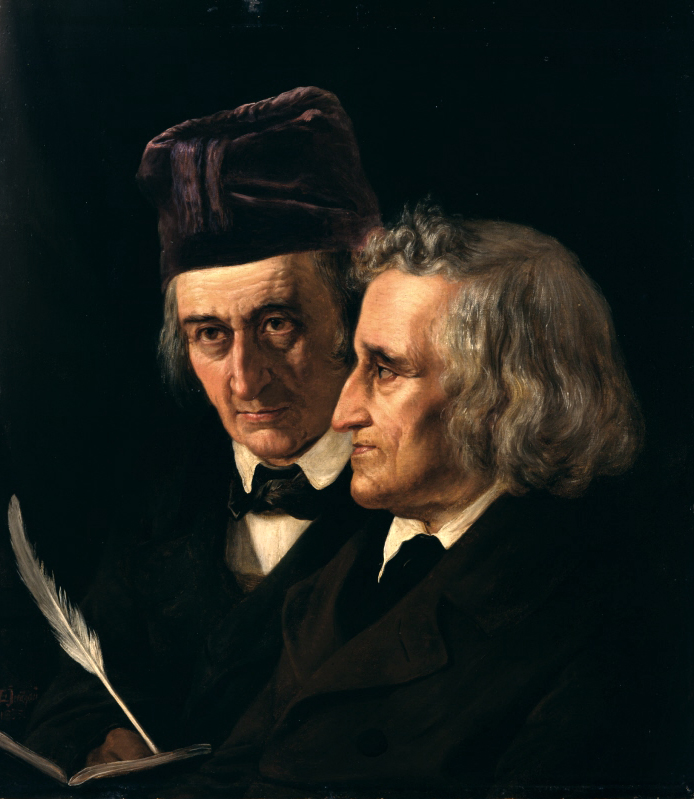
Brothers Grimm, who collected popular German folk tales and published them in a collection

German literature can be traced back to the Middle Ages and the works of writers such as Walther von der Vogelweide and Wolfram von Eschenbach. Well-known German authors include Johann Wolfgang von Goethe, Friedrich Schiller, Gotthold Ephraim Lessing and Theodor Fontane. The collections of folk tales published by the Brothers Grimm popularised German folklore on an international level. The Grimms also gathered and codified regional variants of the German language, grounding their work in historical principles; their Deutsches Wörterbuch, or German Dictionary, sometimes called the Grimm dictionary, was begun in 1838 and the first volumes published in 1854.

Influential authors of the 20th century include Gerhart Hauptmann, Thomas Mann, Hermann Hesse, Heinrich Böll, and Günter Grass. The German book market is the third-largest in the world, after the United States and China. The Frankfurt Book Fair is the most important in the world for international deals and trading, with a tradition spanning over 500 years. The Leipzig Book Fair also retains a major position in Europe.

German philosophy is historically significant: Gottfried Leibniz's contributions to rationalism; the enlightenment philosophy by Immanuel Kant; the establishment of classical German idealism by Johann Gottlieb Fichte, Georg Wilhelm Friedrich Hegel and Friedrich Wilhelm Joseph Schelling; Arthur Schopenhauer's composition of metaphysical pessimism; the formulation of communist theory by Karl Marx and Friedrich Engels; Friedrich Nietzsche's development of perspectivism; Gottlob Frege's contributions to the dawn of analytic philosophy; Martin Heidegger's works on Being; Oswald Spengler's historical philosophy; and the development of the Frankfurt School have all been very influential.

=== Music ===
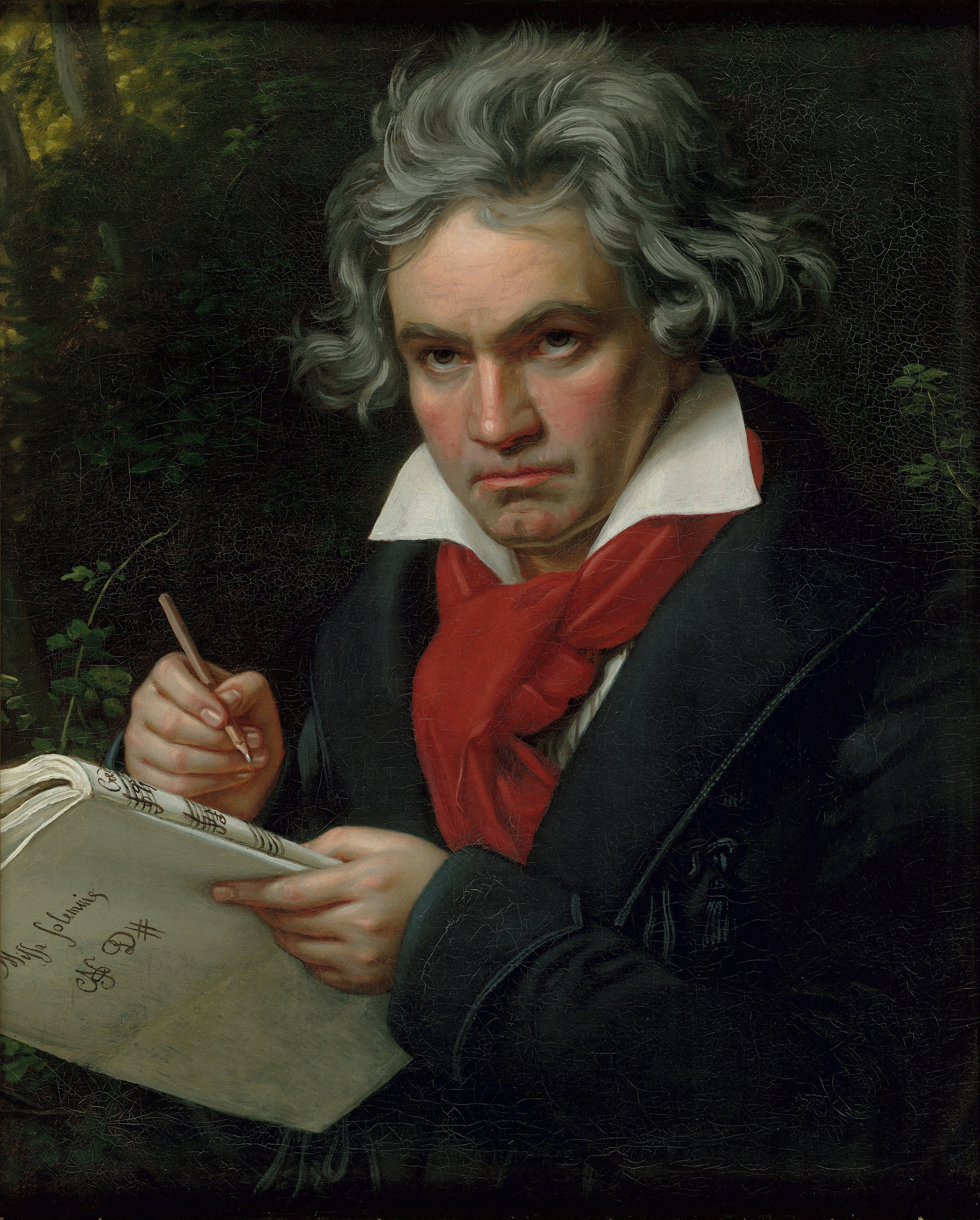
Ludwig van Beethoven (1770–1827), one of the most famed composers of classical music, was born in Bonn.

German classical music includes works by some of the world's most well-known composers. Dieterich Buxtehude, Johann Sebastian Bach and Georg Friedrich Händel were influential composers of the Baroque period. Ludwig van Beethoven was a crucial figure in the transition between the Classical and Romantic eras. Carl Maria von Weber, Felix Mendelssohn, Robert Schumann and Johannes Brahms were significant Romantic composers. Richard Wagner was known for his operas. Richard Strauss was a leading composer of the late Romantic and early modern eras. Karlheinz Stockhausen and Wolfgang Rihm are important composers of the 20th and early 21st centuries.

In 2013, Germany was the second-largest music market in Europe, and fourth-largest in the world. German popular music of the 20th and 21st centuries includes the movements of Neue Deutsche Welle, pop, Ostrock, heavy metal/rock, punk, pop rock, indie, Volksmusik (folk music), schlager pop and German hip hop. German electronic music gained global influence, with Kraftwerk and Tangerine Dream pioneering in this genre. DJs and artists of the techno and house music scenes of Germany have become well known (e.g. Paul van Dyk, Felix Jaehn, Paul Kalkbrenner, Robin Schulz and Scooter).

=== Media ===
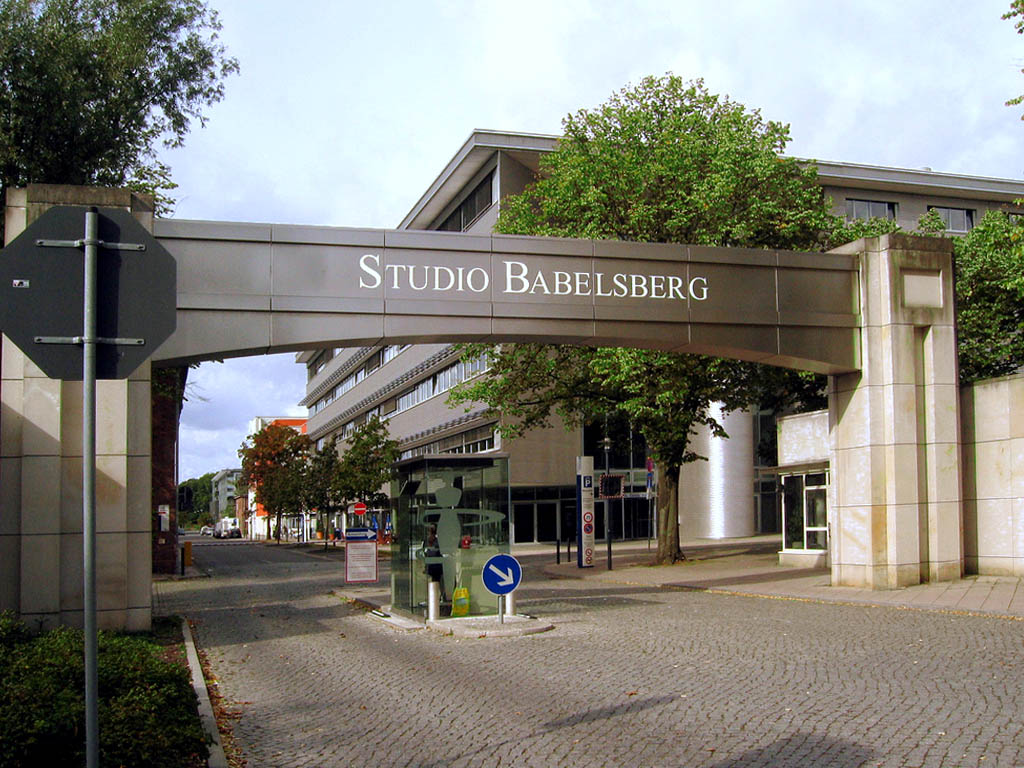
Babelsberg Studio in Potsdam, the first large-scale film studio in the world

The largest internationally operating media companies in Germany are Bertelsmann, Axel Springer SE and ProSiebenSat.1 Media. Germany's television market is the largest in Europe, with over 38 million TV households as of 2012. Around 90% of German households have cable or satellite TV, with a variety of free-to-view public and commercial channels. There are more than 300 public and private radio stations in Germany; Germany's national radio network is the Deutschlandradio, while the public Deutsche Welle is the main radio and television broadcaster in foreign languages. Germany's print media market is the largest in Europe. The German newspapers with the highest circulation are Bild, Süddeutsche Zeitung, Frankfurter Allgemeine Zeitung and Die Welt. The largest German magazines include ADAC Motorwelt and Der Spiegel. Germany has a large video gaming market, with over 34 million players nationwide. The annual Gamescom held in Cologne is the world's largest gaming convention.

German cinema has made major technical and artistic contributions to film. The first works of the Skladanowsky Brothers were shown to an audience in 1895. The renowned Babelsberg Studio in Potsdam was established in 1912, thus being the first large-scale film studio in the world. Early German cinema was particularly influential with German expressionists such as Robert Wiene and Friedrich Wilhelm Murnau. Director Fritz Lang's Metropolis (1927) is referred to as the first major science-fiction film. After 1945, many of the films of the immediate post-war period can be characterised as Trümmerfilm (rubble film). East German film was dominated by the state-owned film studio DEFA, while the dominant genre in West Germany was the Heimatfilm ("homeland film"). The Academy Award for Best Foreign Language Film ("Oscar") went to the German production The Tin Drum (Die Blechtrommel) in 1979, to Nowhere in Africa (Nirgendwo in Afrika) in 2002, and to The Lives of Others (Das Leben der Anderen) in 2007. Various Germans won an Oscar for their performances in films. The annual European Film Awards ceremony is held every other year in Berlin, home of the European Film Academy. The Berlin International Film Festival known as "Berlinale", awarding the "Golden Bear" and held annually since 1951, is one of the world's leading film festivals. The "Lolas" are annually awarded in Berlin, at the German Film Awards.

=== Cuisine ===
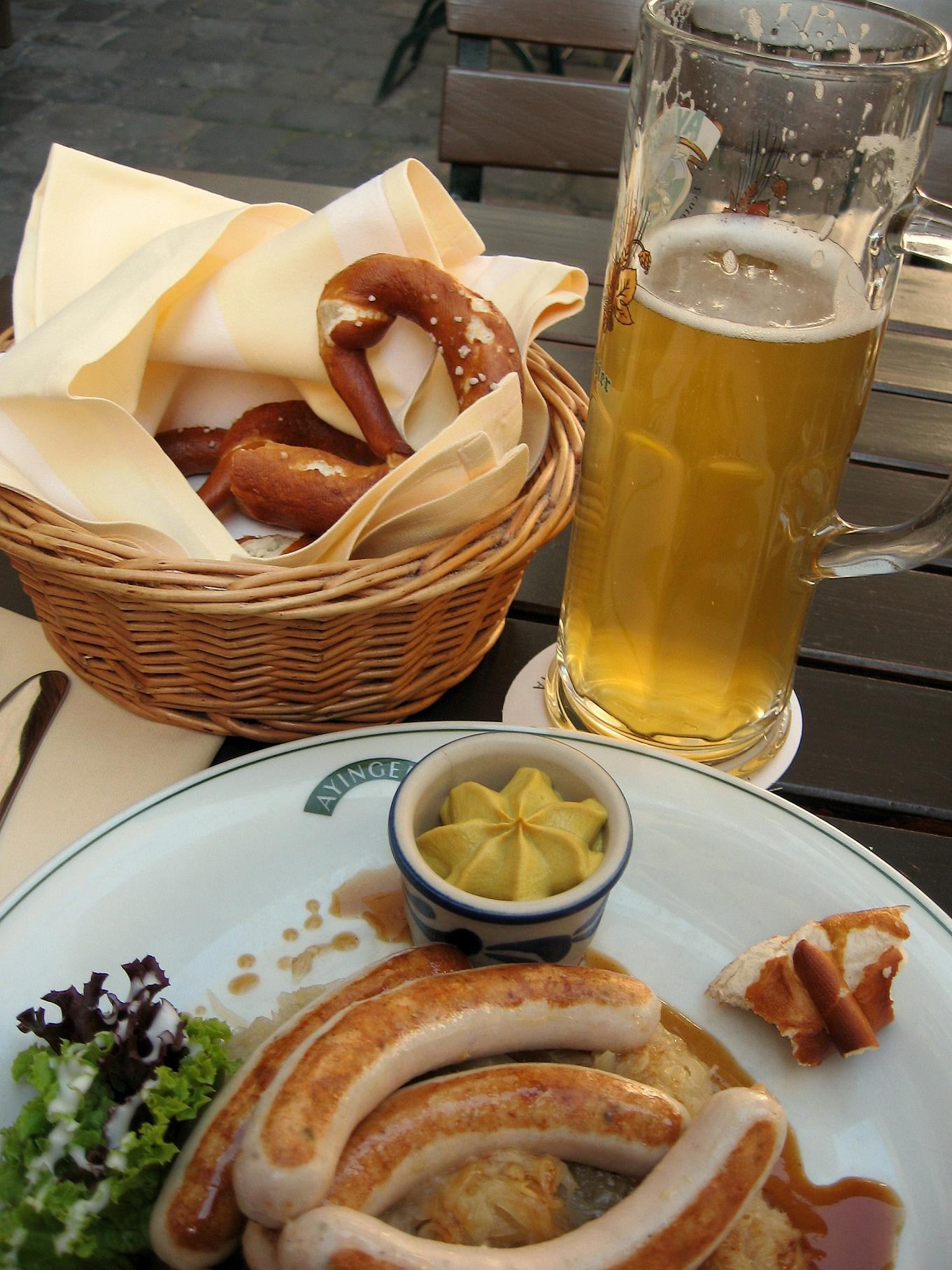
Bavarian Bratwurst with mustard, a pretzel, and German beer

Bread is a significant part of German cuisine, with German bakeries producing about 600 main types of bread and 1,200 types of pastries and rolls (Brötchen). German cheeses account for about 22% of all cheese produced in Europe. Germans produce their ubiquitous sausages in almost 1,500 varieties, including Bratwurst and Weißwurst.

The national alcoholic drink is beer. Germany's beer consumption per capita stood at 110 litres (24 imp gal; 29 US gal) in 2013 and remains among the highest in the world. German beer purity regulations date back to the 16th century. Wine has become popular in many parts of the country, especially near the German wine regions. In 2019, Germany was the ninth-largest wine producer in the world.

The 2018 Michelin Guide awarded eleven restaurants in Germany three stars, giving the country a cumulative total of 300 stars.

=== Sports ===
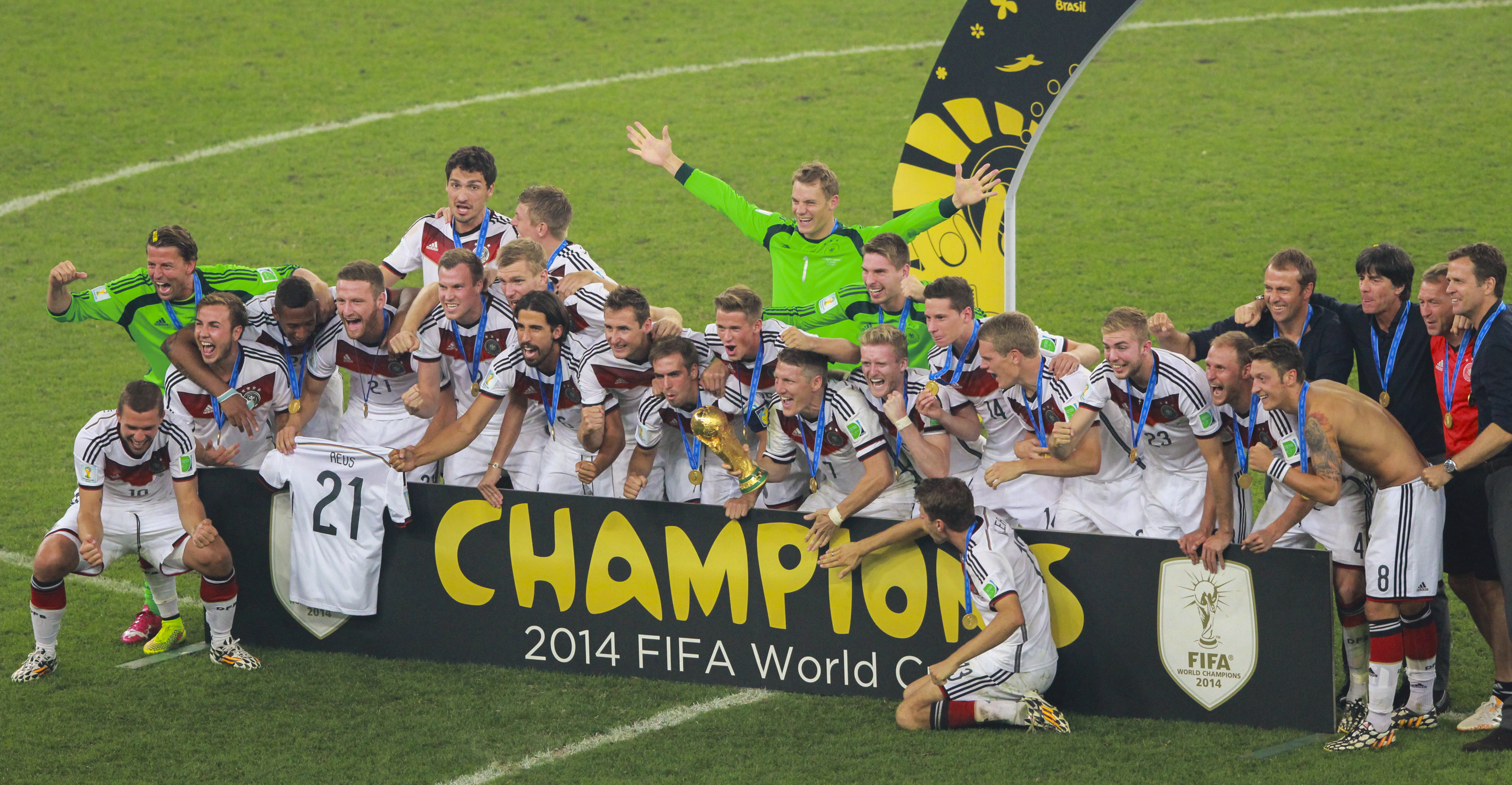
The German national football team after winning the FIFA World Cup for the fourth time in 2014

Football is the most popular sport in Germany. With more than 7 million official members, the German Football Association (Deutscher Fußball-Bund) is the largest single-sport organisation worldwide, and the German top league, the Bundesliga, attracts the second-highest average attendance of all professional sports leagues in the world. The German men's national football team won the FIFA World Cup in 1954, 1974, 1990, and 2014, the UEFA European Championship in 1972, 1980 and 1996, and the FIFA Confederations Cup in 2017.

Germany is one of the world's leading motor sports countries, with constructors such as BMW and Mercedes playing prominent roles in international competition. Porsche has won the 24 Hours of Le Mans race 19 times, and Audi 13 times, as of April 2024. The driver Michael Schumacher has set many motor sport records, having won seven Formula One World Drivers' Championships. Sebastian Vettel is also among the most successful Formula One drivers of all time.

German athletes historically have been successful contenders in the Olympic Games, ranking third in an all-time Olympic Games medal count when combining East and West German medals prior to German reunification. In 1936, Berlin hosted the Summer Games and the Winter Games in Garmisch-Partenkirchen. Munich hosted the Summer Games of 1972.

== See also ==
- Outline of Germany
