= Corruption in Germany =

Corruption in Germany describes the prevention and occurrence of corruption in Germany. Transparency International's 2025 Corruption Perceptions Index scored Germany at 77 on a scale from 0 ("highly corrupt") to 100 ("very clean"). When ranked by score, Germany ranked 10th among the 182 countries in the Index, where the country ranked first is perceived to have the most honest public sector. For comparison with regional scores, the best score among Western European and European Union countries (Note: Austria, Belgium, Bulgaria, Croatia, Cyprus, Czechia, Denmark, Estonia, Finland, France, Germany, Greece, Hungary, Iceland, Ireland, Italy, Latvia, Lithuania, Luxembourg, Malta, Netherlands, Norway, Poland, Portugal, Romania, Slovakia, Slovenia, Spain, Sweden, Switzerland, and the United Kingdom.) was 89, the average score was 64 and the worst score was 40. For comparison with worldwide scores, the best score was 89 (ranked 1), the average score was 42, and the worst score was 9 (ranked 181, in a two-way tie).

Transparency International’s Global Corruption Barometer 2013 reveals that political parties and businesses are the most corrupt institutions in Germany. The same report also indicates that petty corruption is not as common as in other European countries. The survey shows that 11% of the respondents claim to have been asked to pay a bribe at one point in their life and only a few of those said that they had refused to pay the bribe.

According to Freedom House's report, Germany’s ability to ensure integrity and prevent corruption in state bodies is generally sufficient due to a strong institutional setup.

== See also ==
- CDU donations scandal
- Crime in Germany
- Flick affair
- Group of States Against Corruption
- Lobbying in Germany
- International Anti-Corruption Academy
- International Anti-Corruption Day
- ISO 37001 Anti-bribery management systems
- OECD Anti-Bribery Convention
- Transparency International
- United Nations Convention against Corruption
