= List of metropolitan areas in Europe =

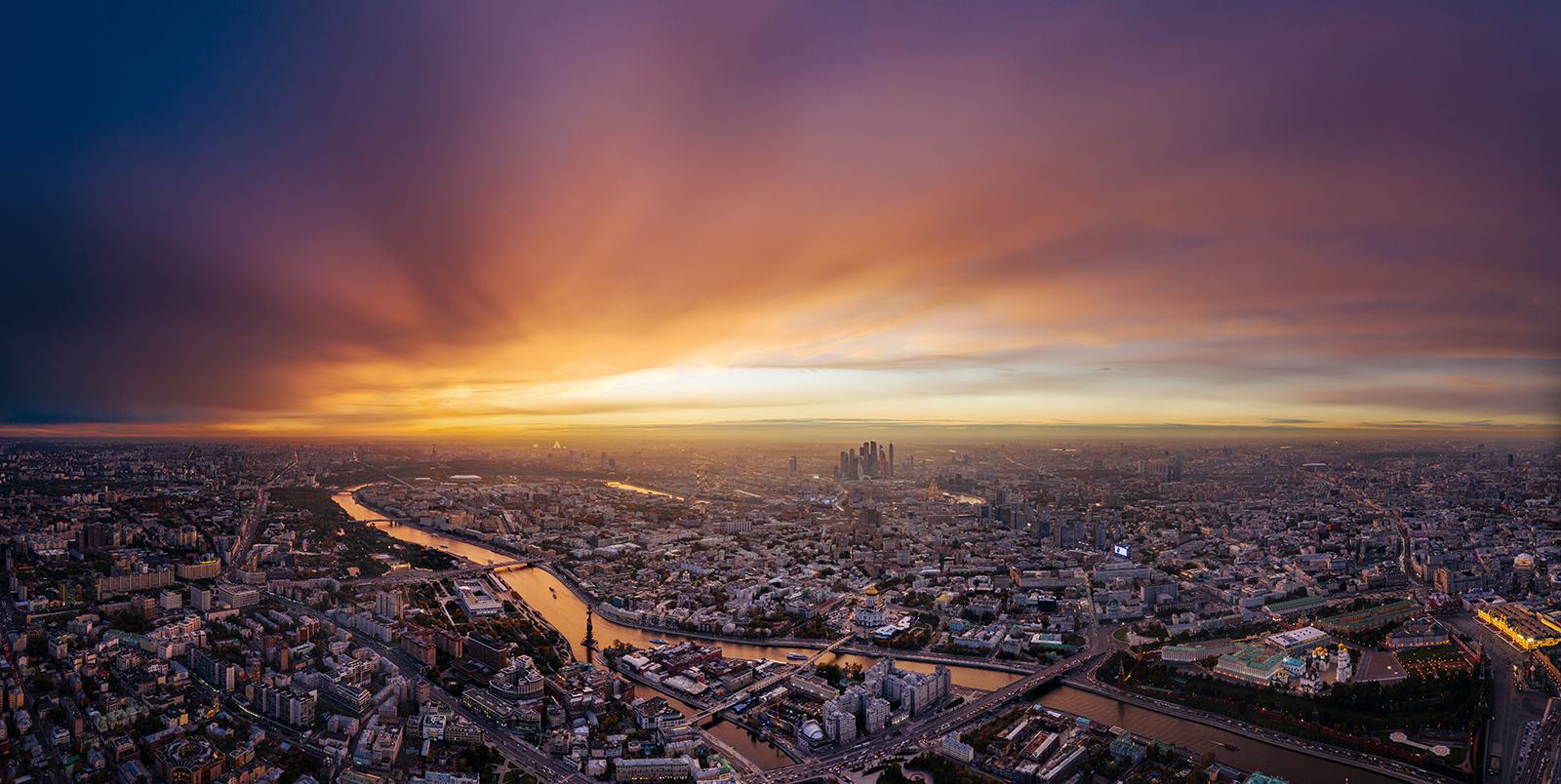
Moscow, the capital of Russia, has the most populous metropolitan area in Europe.

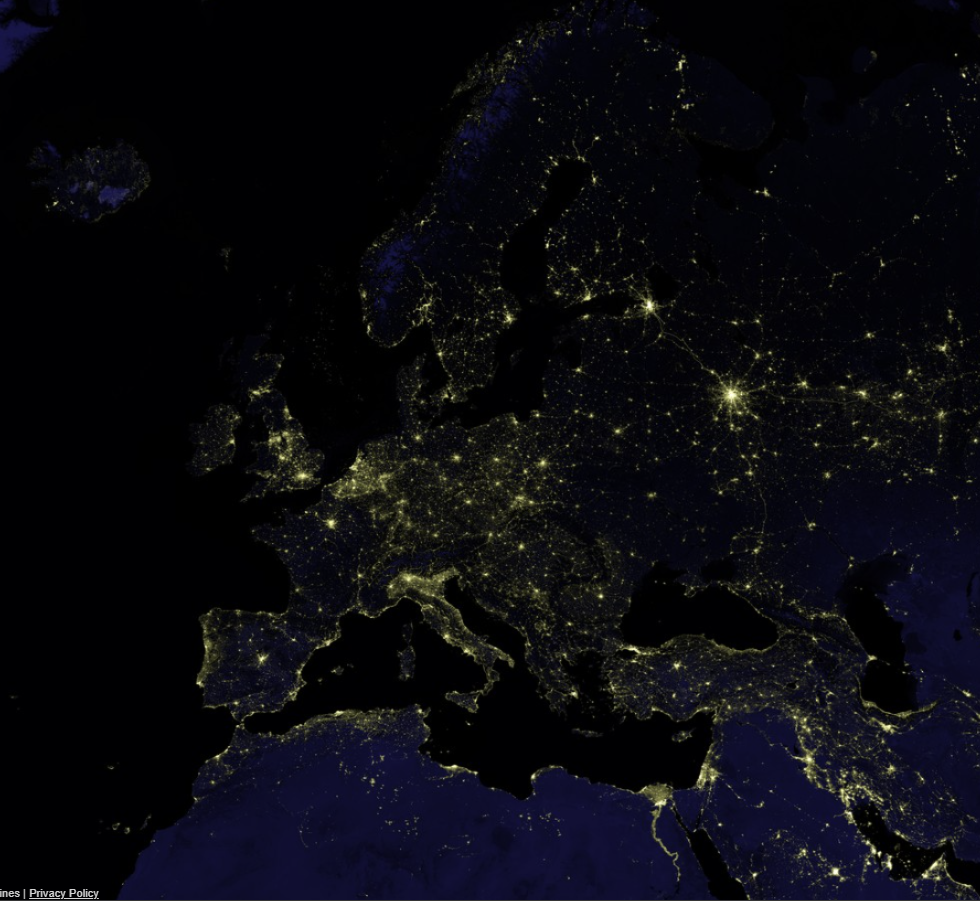
Europe and some parts of Africa and Asia at night. Lights reveal the urbanized areas of Europe. It also shows the Blue Banana megalopolis from north-west England to northern Italy, and the Golden Banana urbanized area between Genoa and Valencia.

Blue, Golden, Green Bananas

This list ranks metropolitan areas in Europe by their population according to three different sources; it includes metropolitan areas that have a population of over 1 million.

== Sources ==
List includes metropolitan areas according only to the studies of ESPON, Eurostat, and OECD. For this reason some metropolitan areas, like the Italian Genoa Metropolitan Area (with a population of 1,510,781 as of 2010) and the Ukrainian Kryvyi Rih metropolitan area (with a population of 1,170,953 as of 2019), are not included in this list, with data by other statistic survey institutes.

Population figures correspond to the populations of functional urban areas (FUA). The concept of a functional urban area defines a metropolitan area as a core urban area defined morphologically on the basis of population density, plus the surrounding labour pool defined on the basis of commuting. Figures in the first two population columns use a harmonised definition of a functional urban area developed jointly in 2011, with delimitation basing on the DEGURBA method.

Further information on how the areas are defined can be found in the source documents. These figures should be seen as an interpretation, not as conclusive fact.

== Metropolitan areas ==
Areas within the European Union

Metropolitan area name	Country	Banana			OECD (2020)	Eurostat
Metropolitan area name	Country	Blue	Golden	Green	OECD (2020)	Eurostat
Amsterdam metropolitan area	Netherlands	Yes			2,017,935	2,961,252 (2023)
Antwerp	Belgium	Yes			1,860,869	1,183,670 (2024)
Athens metropolitan area	Greece				3,618,860	3,828,434 (2011)
Barcelona metropolitan area	Spain		Yes		5,345,763	5,156,444 (2023)
Belgrade	Serbia				1,612,587	—
Berlin metropolitan area	Germany				4,558,043	5,106,083 (2023)
Bilbao metropolitan area	Spain				957,261	1,044,944 (2023)
Bordeaux	France				1,085,823	1,412,388 (2022)
Greater Bristol	United Kingdom				1,274,128	955,541 (2018)
Brussels metropolitan area	Belgium	Yes			2,338,157	3,425,403 (2024)
Bucharest metropolitan area	Romania				2,348,982	2,478,618 (2018)
Budapest metropolitan area	Hungary			Yes	2,798,396	2,968,809 (2023)
Cardiff	United Kingdom				1,165,502	915,466 (2018)
Copenhagen metropolitan area	Denmark				2,088,197	1,928,612 (2013)
Dnipro	Ukraine				1,014,593	—
Donetsk	Ukraine				1,450,194	—
Dublin Metropolitan Area	Ireland				1,721,812	1,793,902 (2011)
Frankfurt Rhine-Main	Germany	Yes			3,167,862	2,722,157 (2023)
Gdańsk (Tricity)	Poland			Yes	987,006	1,223,884 (2021)
Greater Glasgow	United Kingdom				1,790,499	1,830,710 (2018)
Gothenburg	Sweden				941,867	1,021,831 (2018)
The Hague	Netherlands	Yes			3,592,389 (Note: Combined total population of Rotterdam–The Hague metropolitan area.)	1,150,797 (2023)
Hamburg Metropolitan Region	Germany				2,763,491	3,493,121 (2023)
Hannover	Germany				1,156,114	1,310,004 (2023)
Helsinki Metropolitan Area	Finland				1,439,175	1,750,158 (2024)
Istanbul (Note: 65% of the population lives on the European part)	Turkey				14,693,269	11,044,642 (2004)
Katowice metropolitan area	Poland			Yes	2,843,725	2,417,386 (2021)
Kazan metropolitan area	Russia				1,341,784	—
Kharkiv	Ukraine				1,713,794	—
Kraków metropolitan area	Poland				1,339,089	1,489,912 (2021)
Kyiv metropolitan area	Ukraine				3,545,076	—
Lille	France	Yes			1,226,810	1,528,848 (2022)
Lisbon metropolitan area	Portugal				2,731,340	3,115,288 (2024)
Liverpool City Region	United Kingdom	Yes			1,729,058	1,533,860 (2018)
Łódź metropolitan area	Poland			Yes	1,041,339	893,083 (2021)
London metropolitan area	United Kingdom	Yes			13,475,297	12,434,823 (2018)
Lyon	France		Yes		2,090,206	2,327,861 (2022)
Madrid metropolitan area	Spain				6,989,714	6,982,656 (2022)
Málaga	Spain				1,048,764	903,175 (2023)
Greater Manchester	United Kingdom	Yes			3,374,693	3,348,274 (2018)
Mannheim-Ludwigshafen	Germany	Yes			1,755,988	1,334,633 (2022)
Marseille	France		Yes		1,322,989	1,900,957 (2023)
Milan metropolitan area	Italy	Yes	Yes		5,301,987	5,071,521 (2024)
Minsk metropolitan area	Belarus				2,173,105	—
Moscow metropolitan area	Russia				17,217,606	—
Munich	Germany	Yes			2,618,482	3,066,200 (2023)
Nantes	France				946,441	1,041,894 (2022)
Naples metropolitan area	Italy				4,095,364	3,377,568 (2024)
Nice	France		Yes		1,143,557	634,940 (2022)
Nizhny Novgorod	Russia				1,430,212	—
Northwest Metropolitan Region (Bremen)	Germany				912,616	1,058,197 (2023)
Nottingham-Derby	United Kingdom	Yes			1,618,393	1,406,315 (Note: Lists Nottingham (919,484) and Derby (486,831) as two separate metropolitan areas.) (2018)
Nuremberg Metropolitan Region	Germany	Yes			1,307,726	1,197,848 (2023)
Odesa	Ukraine				1,273,381	—
Greater Oslo Region	Norway				1,422,223	1,278,827 (2013)
Paris metropolitan area	France	Yes			11,249,025	13,239,090 (2022)
Porto Metropolitan Area	Portugal				1,651,124	1,339,620 (2024)
Portsmouth-Southampton	United Kingdom	Yes			1,390,006	1,230,011 (Note: Lists Portsmouth (542,040) and Southampton (687,971) as two separate metropolitan areas.) (2018)
Poznań metropolitan area	Poland			Yes	975,965	1,051,414 (2021)
Prague metropolitan area	Czech Republic				1,977,776	2,216,746 (2022)
Rhein-Nord (Note: Polycentric metropolitan area) (Düsseldorf – Neuss)	Germany	Yes			2,557,228 (Note: Lists Düsseldorf (1,087,466), Wuppertal (872,475), and Mönchengladbach (597,287) as three separate metropolitan areas.)	2,279,102 (Note: Lists Düsseldorf (1,482,443), Wuppertal (387,599), and Mönchengladbach (409,060) as three separate metropolitan areas.) (2023)
Rhein-Süd (Cologne – Bonn)	Germany	Yes			3,354,797	3,034,481 (Note: Lists Cologne (2,234,016) and Bonn (800,465) as two separate metropolitan areas.) (2023)
Rome metropolitan area	Italy				3,684,930	4,383,028 (2024)
Rostov-on-Don	Russia				1,349,583	—
Rotterdam	Netherlands	Yes			3,592,389	1,880,019 (2023)
Ruhr	Germany	Yes			6,108,500	5,068,912 (2021)
Saint Petersburg metropolitan area	Russia				5,518,560	—
Samara	Russia				1,307,406	—
Saratov	Russia				1,097,493	—
Seville metropolitan area	Spain				1,299,106	1,567,827 (2021)
Sofia	Bulgaria				1,488,887	1,531,867 (2022)
South Yorkshire (Sheffield-Doncaster)	United Kingdom	Yes			1,166,720	1,189,393 (2018)
Metropolitan Stockholm	Sweden				2,241,651	2,308,143 (2018)
Stuttgart Metropolitan Region	Germany	Yes			2,300,011	2,558,400 (2023)
Tbilisi (Note: Continental placement may vary depending on geographic convention being followed.)	Georgia				1,485,293	—
Thessaloniki metropolitan area	Greece				1,011,795	973,997 (2011)
Toulouse	France		Yes		1,332,370	1,513,396 (2022)
Turin metropolitan area	Italy	Yes	Yes		1,828,088	1,776,003 (2023)
Tyne and Wear (Newcastle-Sunderland)	United Kingdom				1,719,730	1,175,274 (2018)
Ufa	Russia				1,149,103	—
Valencia	Spain		Yes		1,916,932	1,811,626 (2023)
Vienna	Austria			Yes	2,565,196	—
Volgograd	Russia				1,402,254	—
Voronezh	Russia				1,127,100	—
Warsaw metropolitan area	Poland			Yes	2,975,932	3,374,742 (2021)
West Midlands conurbation (Birmingham)	United Kingdom	Yes			3,083,783	3,097,965 (2018)
West Yorkshire Built-up Area (Leeds – Bradford)	United Kingdom	Yes			3,010,473	2,619,128 (2018)
Yerevan	Armenia				1,232,670	—
Zagreb metropolitan area	Croatia			Yes	1,008,763	1,161,259 (2022)
Zurich metropolitan area	Switzerland	Yes			2,124,246	1,951,341 (2022)

== See also ==
- List of European cities by population within city limits
- List of urban areas in Europe
- List of European city regions
- Lists of cities in Europe
- List of largest cities in the European Union by population within city limits
- List of urban areas in the European Union
- List of European Union cities proper by population density
- List of metropolitan areas by population for the world
- World's largest cities

=== Regional and country-specific lists ===
- Largest metropolitan areas in the Nordic countries
- List of metropolitan areas in Belgium
- List of metropolitan areas in France
- List of metropolitan areas in Germany
- List of metropolitan areas in Italy
- List of metropolitan areas in Poland
- List of metropolitan areas in Romania
- List of metropolitan areas in Spain
- List of metropolitan areas in Sweden
- List of metropolitan areas in the United Kingdom
