= List of cities in the European Union by population within city limits =

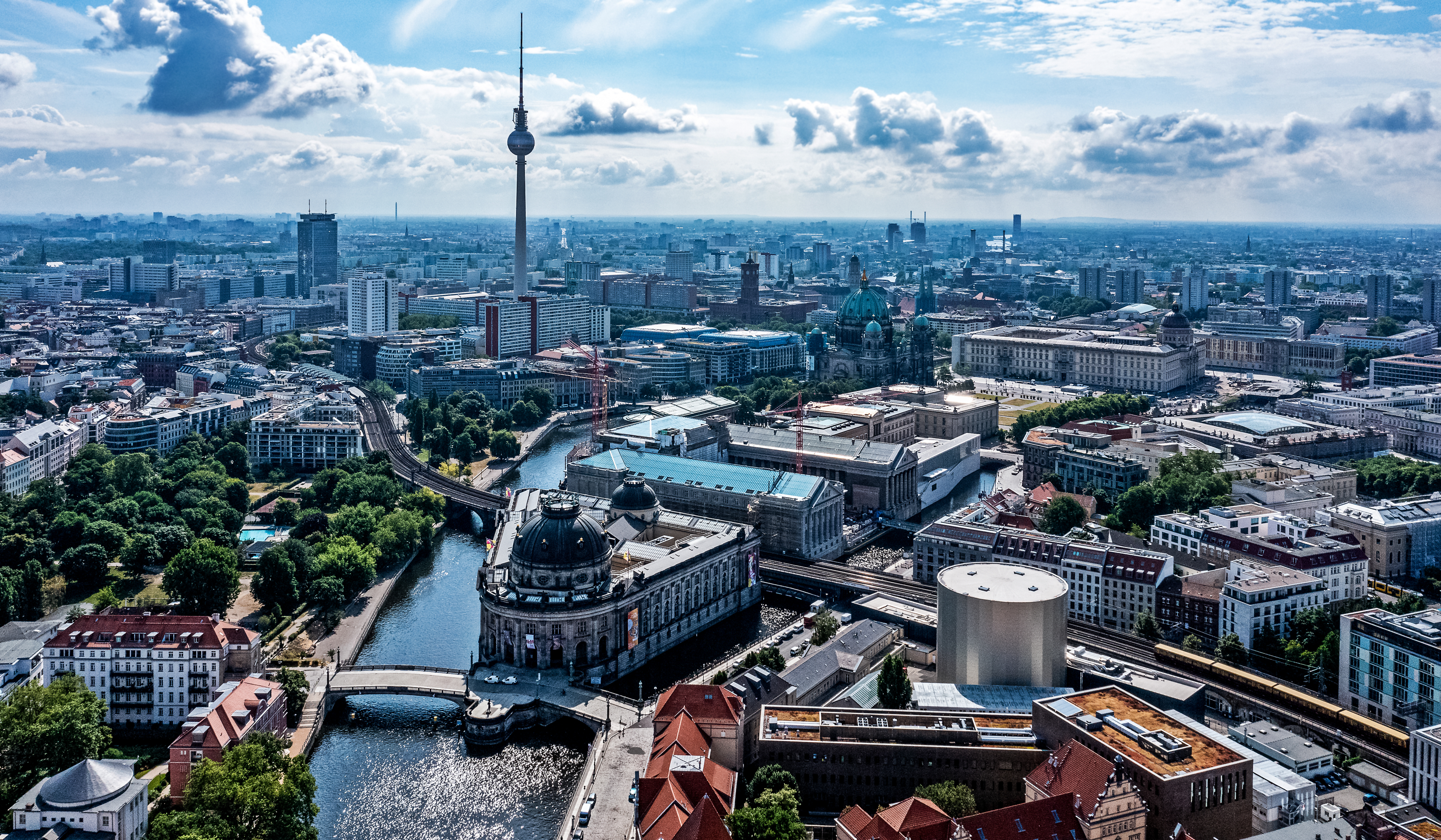
Berlin, the most populous city in the European Union

This is a list of the largest cities in the European Union according to the population within their city boundary. The cities listed all have populations over 300,000. The list deals exclusively with the areas within city administrative boundaries as opposed to urban areas or larger urban zones (metropolitan areas), which are generally larger in terms of population than the main city (although they can also be smaller).

As some cities have a very narrow boundary and others a very wide one, the list may not give an accurate view of the comparative magnitude of entire urban areas, and thus the figures in the list should be treated with caution. Common examples of confusion are Paris, where the Paris metropolitan area has different boundaries than the city proper, the City of Brussels that is confused with the Brussels-Capital Region, and Portuguese municipalities, where the population of the municipality's core may be significantly lower than the total population within its boundaries.

== Cities by population within the city boundary ==
Cities in bold are capital cities of their respective countries.

City	Member state	Official population	Date	Ref.
**Berlin**	Germany	3,913,644	31 Dec 2025	
**Madrid**	Spain	3,506,730	1 Jan 2025	
**Rome**	Italy	2,745,062	1 Jan 2026	
**Paris**	France	2,047,602	1 Jan 2026	
**Vienna**	Austria	2,044,366	1 Apr 2026	
Hamburg	Germany	1,869,786	31 Mar 2026	
**Warsaw**	Poland	1,866,729	31 Dec 2025	
Barcelona	Spain	1,731,649	1 Jan 2025	
**Bucharest**	Romania	1,709,458	1 Jan 2025	
**Budapest**	Hungary	1,675,777	1 Jan 2026	
Munich	Germany	1,505,036	31 Dec 2025	
**Prague**	Czech Republic	1,405,551	31 Mar 2026	
Milan	Italy	1,362,863	1 Jan 2026	
**Sofia**	Bulgaria	1,303,813	31 Dec 2025	
Cologne	Germany	1,025,523	31 Dec 2025	
**Stockholm**	Sweden	1,000,962	30 Jun 2026	
**Amsterdam**	Netherlands	945,870	30 Jun 2026	
Naples	Italy	905,050	1 Jan 2026	
Marseille	France	890,707	1 Jan 2024	
Turin	Italy	855,654	1 Jan 2026	
Valencia	Spain	840,792	1 Jan 2025	
Kraków	Poland	816,614	31 Dec 2025	
**Zagreb**	Croatia	777,359	31 Dec 2024	
Frankfurt	Germany	756,021	31 Dec 2024	
**Helsinki**	Finland	699,637	1 Jul 2026	
Zaragoza	Spain	693,091	1 Jan 2025	
Seville	Spain	689,423	1 Jan 2025	
Rotterdam	Netherlands	673,966	30 Jun 2026	
Wrocław	Poland	672,601	31 Dec 2025	
**Copenhagen**	Denmark	671,714	1 Jan 2026	
**Lisbon**	Portugal	658,236	31 Dec 2025	
**Athens**	Greece	643,450	1 Jan 2024	
Łódź	Poland	639,890	31 Dec 2025	
Palermo	Italy	626,273	1 Jan 2026	
Düsseldorf	Germany	619,444	31 Dec 2025	
**Vilnius**	Lithuania	619,405	1 Jul 2026	
Gothenburg	Sweden	614,165	30 Jun 2026	
Stuttgart	Germany	612,663	31 Dec 2024	
Leipzig	Germany	611,850	31 Dec 2024	
Dortmund	Germany	600,880	31 Dec 2025	
Málaga	Spain	599,063	1 Jan 2025	
**Dublin**	Ireland	592,713	3 Apr 2022	
**Riga**	Latvia	588,911	1 Jan 2026	
Bremen	Germany	586,271	31 Dec 2024	
Essen	Germany	573,618	31 Dec 2025	
Antwerp	Belgium	572,365	1 Jul 2026	
The Hague	Netherlands	569,293	30 Jun 2026	
Genoa	Italy	566,247	1 Jan 2026	
Dresden	Germany	564,904	31 Dec 2024	
Poznań	Poland	534,239	31 Dec 2025	
Nuremberg	Germany	531,159	31 Dec 2025	
Lyon	France	527,236	1 Jan 2024	
Toulouse	France	522,662	1 Jan 2024	
Hanover	Germany	522,131	31 Dec 2024	
Duisburg	Germany	500,810	31 Dec 2025	
Gdańsk	Poland	489,328	31 Dec 2025	
**Bratislava**	Slovakia	480,947	1 Jan 2026	
Murcia	Spain	479,405	1 Jan 2025	
**Tallinn**	Estonia	452,563	1 Jan 2026	
Sintra	Portugal	449,956	31 Dec 2025	
Palma de Mallorca	Spain	434,786	1 Jan 2025	
Brno	Czech Republic	404,296	1 Jan 2026	
Bologna	Italy	391,473	1 Jan 2026	
Szczecin	Poland	383,786	31 Dec 2025	
Las Palmas	Spain	381,868	1 Jan 2025	
Utrecht	Netherlands	378,444	30 Jun 2026	
Aarhus	Denmark	378,361	1 Jan 2026	
Malmö	Sweden	368,660	30 Jun 2026	
Alicante	Spain	366,221	1 Jan 2025	
Florence	Italy	361,625	1 Jan 2026	
Bochum	Germany	358,880	31 Dec 2025	
Nice	France	358,527	1 Jan 2024	
Wuppertal	Germany	357,243	31 Dec 2025	
Bilbao	Spain	351,124	1 Jan 2025	
Plovdiv	Bulgaria	333,994	31 Dec 2025	
Nantes	France	332,411	1 Jan 2024	
Bielefeld	Germany	331,419	31 Dec 2025	
Varna	Bulgaria	331,260	31 Dec 2025	
Espoo	Finland	328,502	1 Jul 2026	
Lublin	Poland	326,685	31 Dec 2025	
Bonn	Germany	323,587	31 Dec 2025	
Córdoba	Spain	323,262	1 Jan 2025	
Vila Nova de Gaia	Portugal	323,202	31 Dec 2025	
Bydgoszcz	Poland	321,100	31 Dec 2025	
Mannheim	Germany	318,035	31 Dec 2024	
Bari	Italy	316,248	1 Jan 2026	
Montpellier	France	312,537	1 Jan 2024	
Karlsruhe	Germany	309,050	31 Dec 2024	
Thessaloniki	Greece	307,920	1 Jan 2024	
Münster	Germany	306,368	31 Dec 2025	
Graz	Austria	305,314	1 Jan 2025	
**Ljubljana**	Slovenia	304,079	1 Jul 2026	
Kaunas	Lithuania	303,613	1 Jul 2026	
Valladolid	Spain	302,614	1 Jan 2025	
Augsburg	Germany	301,105	31 Dec 2024	

== See also ==
- List of European cities by population within city limits
- List of urban areas in Europe
- List of metropolitan areas in Europe
- List of larger urban zones (metropolitan area)
- List of urban areas by population
- Blue Banana
- Golden Banana
