= Urban areas in Europe =

This list ranks urban areas in Europe by their population according to two different sources. The list includes urban areas that have a population of over 1 million.

Figures in the first and second column come from the UN's World Urbanization Prospects and list only urban agglomerations. Figures in the third column come from the City Population website and list all continuous urban areas, including conurbations. Further information on how the areas are defined can be found in the source documents. be seen as an interpretation, not as conclusive fact.

== Urban areas ==
Within a European Union member state

Urban area	Country	Agglomerations (UN WUP)		Urban areas (City Population; 2011)
Urban area	Country	(2007)	(2015)	Urban areas (City Population; 2011)
Amsterdam	Netherlands	1,049,000		1,970,000
Antwerp	Belgium	965,000		1,017,197
Athens	Greece	3,257,000	3,051,899	3,575,000
Barcelona	Spain	5,083,000	5,258,319	4,500,000
Belgrade	Serbia	1,617,000		1,430,000
Berlin	Germany	3,450,000	3,563,194	4,325,000
Birmingham (West Midlands)	United Kingdom	2,302,000	2,514,596	2,594,803
Brussels-Capital Region	Belgium	1,904,000		1,910,000
Bucharest	Romania	1,934,000		2,075,000
Budapest	Hungary	1,706,000		2,525,000
Copenhagen	Denmark	1,186,000		1,420,000
Donetsk	Ukraine	966,000		1,450,000
Dnipro	Ukraine	1,004,000		1,360,000
Dublin	Ireland	1,346,000		1,100,000
Frankfurt Rhine-Main Region	Germany	Not listed	Not listed	1,940,000
Greater Glasgow	United Kingdom	1,170,000		1,026,880
The Hague	Netherlands	626,000		Not listed
Hamburg	Germany	1,786,000		2,625,000
Helsinki	Finland	1,115,000		1,120,000
Istanbul	Turkey	10,525,000	14,163,989	15,900,000
Katowice urban area	Poland	Not listed		2,450,000
Kazan	Russia	1,140,000		1,140,000
Kharkiv	Ukraine	1,453,000		1,590,000
Kyiv	Ukraine	2,805,000	2,941,884	3,225,000
Kraków	Poland	756,000		Not listed
West Yorkshire (Bradford–Leeds)	United Kingdom	1,547,000		1,877,125
Lille–Kortrijk–Tournai	France/ Belgium	1,033,000		1,240,000
Lisbon	Portugal	2,824,000	2,884,297	2,575,000
Greater London urban area	United Kingdom	8,631,000	10,313,307	10,552,913
Lyon	France	1,468,000		1,470,000
Madrid	Spain	5,851,000	6,199,254	5,400,000
Greater Manchester	United Kingdom	2,253,000	2,645,598	2,737,412
Marseille	France	1,469,000		1,470,000
Milan	Italy	3,115,392	3,098,974	4,875,000
Minsk	Belarus	1,852,000		1,860,000
Moscow	Russia	10,550,000	12,165,704	14,800,000
Munich	Germany	1,349,000		2,025,000
Naples	Italy	2,276,000	2,201,789	4,890,000
Nice	France	941,000		Not listed
Nizhny Novgorod	Russia	1,267,000		1,760,000
Nuremberg	Germany	Not listed		1,060,000
Odesa	Ukraine	1,009,000		1,070,000
Greater Oslo	Norway	888,000		1,130,000
Paris urban area	France	10,485,000	10,843,285	12,800,000
Perm	Russia	982,000		1,040,000
Porto	Portugal	1,355,000		1,240,000
Prague	Czech Republic	1,162,000		1,390,000
Rhein-Nord (Düsseldorf–Neuss)	Germany	Not listed	Not listed	1,220,000
Rhein-Süd (Cologne–Bonn Region)	Germany	1,001,000	Not listed	1,900,000
Rome	Italy	3,362,000	3,717,956	5,580,000
Rostov-on-Don	Russia	1,046,000		1,190,000
Rotterdam	Netherlands	1,010,000		Not listed
Rotterdam–The Hague	Netherlands	Not listed	Not listed	2,900,000
Ruhr area	Germany	Not listed	Not listed	4,650,000
Saint Petersburg	Russia	4,575,000	4,992,991	4,775,000
Samara	Russia	1,131,000		1,270,000
Saratov	Russia	822,000		1,070,000
Seville	Spain	Not listed		1,340,000
Sofia	Bulgaria	1,196,000		1,260,000
Stockholm urban area	Sweden	1,285,000		2,075,000
Stuttgart	Germany	Not listed		1,980,000
Thessaloniki urban area	Greece	837,000		Not listed
Turin	Italy	1,665,000		1,690,000
Ufa	Russia	1,023,000		1,040,000
Valencia	Spain	814,000		1,780,000
Vienna	Austria	1,706,000		2,025,000
Volgograd	Russia	977,000		1,360,000
Warsaw	Poland	1,712,000		2,225,000
Zürich	Switzerland	1,150,000		1,180,000

== See also ==
- List of cities in Europe by population within city limits
- List of metropolitan areas in Europe
- List of largest cities in the European Union by population within city limits
- List of urban areas in the European Union
- List of larger urban zones (metropolitan area)
- List of cities in Europe by country
- List of European cities proper by population density
- List of European city regions
- World's largest cities
