= Urban areas in the European Union =

This is a list of urban areas in the European Union with over 500,000 inhabitants as of 2022. The data comes from Demographia and the United Nations Department of Economic and Social Affairs. Demographia provides figures for urban areas (including conurbations), while the UN DESA figures are a mix agglomerations, cities proper and metropolitan areas. For comparison, Functional Urban Area (FUA) population figures by Eurostat are also provided, however, these measure the wider metropolitan areas.

== Important notes ==
- This is a list of urban areas, not a list of metropolitan areas. Urban and metropolian areas are different because Urban areas are contiguous built-up areas where houses are typically not more than 200 m (660 ft) apart, not including rivers, parks, roads, industrial fields, etc. A metropolitan area is an urban area plus any satellite cities around it and any agricultural land in between. For instance Paris is sometimes listed with 12 million inhabitants, Stuttgart is frequently listed with 2.2 million inhabitants, Munich with 2 million or more, etc., indicating the wider metropolitan area of those places. Metropolitan areas, which imply much more complicated definitions (such as the proportion of people in satellite cities working in the core of the metropolitan area), can be accurately computed only by statistical offices, after they have chosen a definition for metropolitan areas, whereas urban areas can be computed by any institution or person with the study of maps, satellite imagery and other geographical data in order to determine the outer limits of a continuous built-up area with one or more neighbouring cities. Furthermore, the list does not make a difference between cities that have multiple satellites and cities that do not. Therefore, two cities with the same demographics for their urban area will have an equal ranking on this list, even if one of the two cities may be much larger as it is the core of a number of satellites.
- This is a list of urban areas, not a list of administrative cities. For example, the list of conurbations contains the urban area of Lille-Kortrijk. Lille and Kortrijk remain two very distinct cities, each belonging to a different country, culture and language area. For a list of the largest cities of the European Union by population, see List of cities in the European Union by population within city limits.

== Urban areas over 500,000 inhabitants (2015–2022) ==
Rank	Urban area	Image	State	Population (2023) (urban areas; Demographia)	ESPON Population (Functional Urban Area)	Population (UN)	FUA population (metropolitan areas; Eurostat)	Density (per km^{2}; Demographia)	Annual growth rate (%)
1	Paris		France	11,108,000	12,998,583	10,901,000 (agglomeration)	13,125,142 (2020)	3,893	1.83
2	Madrid		Spain	6,798,000	5,263,000	6,497,000 (city proper)	6,982,656 (2022)	4,980	
3	Ruhr		Germany	6,769,000	5,376,000	N/A	N/A	2,523	
4	Milan		Italy	5,471,000	7,636,000	3,132,000 (metro)	4,934,205 (2022)	2,459	
5	Barcelona		Spain	5,317,000	4,082,000	5,494,000 (city proper)	5,093,585 (2022)	4,959	
6	Berlin		Germany	4,286,000	4,016,000	3,552,000 (city proper)	4,979,867 (2021)	3,134	
7	Naples		Italy	3,653,000	3,714,000	2,198,000 (metro)	3,303,711 (2022)	3,544	
8	Athens		Greece	3,309,000	3,761,000	3,156,000 (agglomeration)	3,828,434 (2011)	5,678	
9	Rome		Italy	3,239,000	5,190,000	4,210,956 (metro)	4,291,581 (2022)	2,829	
10	Rotterdam–The Hague		Netherlands	3,027,000	1,904,000	N/A	3,035,679 (2022)	2,981	
11	Lisbon		Portugal	2,832,000	2,591,000	2,927,000 (metro)	3,049,222 (2023)	2,979	
12	Budapest		Hungary	2,407,000	2,523,000	1,759,00 (city proper)	3,001,643 (2022)	2,414	
13	Brussels		Belgium	2,238,000	2,639,000	2,050,000 (metro)	3,350,969 (2022)	2,572	0.02
14	Cologne–Bonn		Germany	2,218,000	3,070,000	N/A	3,005,728 (2021)	2,845	
15	Stockholm		Sweden	2,200,000	2,171,000	1,583,000 (agglomeration)	2,308,143 (2018)	2,598	0.58
16	Hamburg		Germany	2,189,000	2,983,000	1,793,000 (city proper)	3,421,692 (2021)	2,753	
17	Munich		Germany	2,112,000	2,665,000	1,504,000 (city proper)	3,016,834 (2021)	4,384	0.72
18	Bucharest		Romania	2,097,000	2,064,000	1,821,000 (city proper)	2,412,530 (2015)	5,092	0.10
19	Frankfurt		Germany	2,055,000	2,764,000	n/a	2,678,557 (2021)	3,112	
20	Vienna		Austria	2,030,000	2,584,000	1,901,000 (city proper)	n/a	6,029	1.04
21	Warsaw		Poland	2,028,000	2,785,000	1,768,000 (city proper)	3,374,742 (2022)	3,711	
22	Katowice		Poland	1,903,000	3,029,000	N/A	2,417,386 (2022)	2,615	
23	Amsterdam		Netherlands	1,736,000	2,497,000	1,132,000 (agglomeration)	2,915,114 (2022)	3,565	
24	Copenhagen		Denmark	1,650,000	2,350,000	1,321,000 (metro)	n/a	2,922	
25	Valencia		Spain	1,547,000	1,398,000	N/A	1,775,845 (2022)	3,930	0.29
26	Turin		Italy	1,492,000	1,601,000	1,786,000 (metro)	1,712,372 (2022)	3,919	−0.16
27	Lyon		France	1,424,000	1,669,000	1,690,000 (agglomeration)	2,280,845 (2019)	3,089	0.50
28	Marseille		France	1,406,000	1,530,000	1,599,000 (agglomeration)	1,879,601 (2020)	2,041	0.46
29	Stuttgart		Germany	1,397,000	2,289,000	N/A	2,531,040 (2020)	2,931	
30	Dublin		Ireland	1,386,000	1,477,000	1,201,000 (agglomeration)	1,793,902 (2011)	3,006	1.14
31	Porto		Portugal	1,364,000	1,245,000	1,307,000 (agglomeration)	1,316,989 (2023)	1,715	
32	Lille		France, Belgium	1,315,000	1,379,000	1,054,000 (agglomeration)	1,515,061 (2020)	2,489	0.50
33	Prague		Czech Republic	1,240,000	1,669,000	1,292,000 (city proper)	2,216,746 (2022)	4,023	−0.07
34	Helsinki		Finland	1,146,000	1,285,000	1,279,000 (agglomeration)	1,551,959 (2022)	2,223	0.81
35	Seville		Spain	1,138,000	1,180,000	N/A	1,556,975 (2022)	4,185	
36	Sofia		Bulgaria	1,087,000	1,174,000	1,272,000 (agglomeration)	1,531,867 (2022)	5,246	0.78
37	Antwerp		Belgium	1,070,000	1,406,000	1,032,000 (metro)	1,157,068 (2022)	1,608	0.05
38	Toulouse		France	946,000	832,000	N/A	1,470,899 (2020)	1,864	0.72
39	Utrecht		Netherlands	907,000	692,000	N/A	895,000 (2022)	2,894	
40	Gdańsk		Poland	874,000	993,000	N/A	1,223,884 (2021)	2,909	
41	Nice		France	871,000	1,082,000	N/A	618,489 (2019)	1,868	0.52
42	Thessaloniki		Greece	844,000	1,052,000	N/A	973,997 (2011)	3,910	0.39
43	Bordeaux		France	827,000	918,000	N/A	1,376,375 (2020)	1,104	0.60
44	Łódź		Poland	798,000	1,165,000	N/A	893,083 (2021)	2,751	
45	Bilbao		Spain	782,000	947,000	N/A	1,041,059 (2022)	5,297	
46	Florence		Italy	764,000	645,000	N/A	784,279 (2022)	3,352	
47	Palermo		Italy	747,000	861,000	N/A	986,721 (2022)	4,241	0.12
48	Kraków		Poland	744,000	1,236,000	N/A	1,489,912 (2021)	3,503	
49	Hanover		Germany	742,000	997,000	N/A	1,289,320 (2021)	2,558	
50	Nuremberg		Germany	720,000	1,443,000	N/A	1,181,541 (2021)	3,055	
51	Zaragoza		Spain	707,000	639,000	N/A	770,370 (2022)	4,789	
52	Dresden		Germany	698,000	882,000	N/A	965,353 (2021)	2,567	
53	Málaga		Spain	692,000	944,000	N/A	887,146 (2022)	5,138	
54	Zagreb		Croatia	691,000	1,153,255	N/A	1,161,259 (2022)	3,706	
55	Catania		Italy	687,000	707,000	N/A	643,274 (2022)	2,550	
56	Gothenburg		Sweden	629,000	759,000	N/A	1,021,831 (2018)	2,198	
57	Poznań		Poland	680,000	919,000	N/A	1,051,414 (2021)	2,004	
58	Bergamo		Italy	660,000	662,000	N/A	310,020 (2022)	2,022	
59	Mannheim		Germany	658,000	683,000	N/A	n/a	2,920	
60	Leipzig		Germany	636,000	842,000	N/A	956,290 (2021)	2,506	
61	Wrocław		Poland	635,000	861,000	N/A	963,311 (2021)	2,636	
62	Las Palmas		Spain	619,000	640,000	N/A	630,900 (2022)	2,879	
63	Riga		Latvia	603,000	1,195,000	N/A	917,351 (2022)	2,217	
64	Bremen		Germany	599,000	1,077,000	N/A	1,046,897 (2021)	2,161	
65	Nantes		France	578,000	708,000	N/A	1,022,775 (2020)	2,277	
66	Aachen		Germany	571,000	672,000	N/A	594,324 (2020)	2,080	
67	Vilnius		Lithuania	550,000	680,000	N/A	716,856 (2021)	1,966	
68	Genoa		Italy	546,000	694,000	N/A	681,459 (2022)	7,027	
69	Palma		Spain	522,000	433,000	N/A	709,091 (2020)	3,359	
70	Santa Cruz		Spain	510,000		N/A	520,728 (2021)	4,688	

=== Other notable urban areas ===
Urban area	Image	State	ESPON Population (Functional Urban Area)	FUA population (metropolitan areas; Eurostat)
Aarhus		Denmark	845,971	
Oviedo–Gijón–Avilés		Spain	844,000	
Alicante–Elche–Elda		Spain	793,000	
Ostrava		Czech Republic	709,768	713,812 (2017)
Bologna		Italy	690,000	785,941 (2021)
Malmö		Sweden	658,050	669,741 (2018)
Grenoble		France	555,000	717,469 (2019)
Douai-Lens		France	550,000	
Toulon		France	518,000	573,230 (2019)
Charleroi		Belgium	489,264	
Odense		Denmark	485,672	
Granada		Spain	440,000	571,447 (2020)
Vigo		Spain	413,000	547,151 (2020)
Montpellier		France		801,595 (2019)
Eindhoven		Netherlands		771,263 (2021)
Rennes		France		755,668 (2019)
Brno		Czech Republic		727,759 (2017)
Bari		Italy		727,549 (2021)
Heidelberg		Germany		709,840 (2020)
Rouen		France		705,627 (2019)
Augsburg		Germany		684,705 (2020)
Bratislava		Slovakia		669,592 (2020)
Kiel		Germany		649,578 (2020)
Murcia		Spain		646,099 (2020)
Catania		Italy		640,088 (2021)
Tallinn		Estonia		609,515 (2021)
Ghent		Belgium		605,956 (2018)
Venice		Italy		552,414 (2021)
Groningen		Netherlands		543,707 (2021)
Plovdiv		Bulgaria		542,407 (2020)
Padua		Italy		535,922 (2021)
Münster		Germany		535,879 (2020)
Erfurt		Germany		524,565 (2020)
Tours		France		519,778 (2019)
Verona		Italy		517,271 (2021)
Nancy		France		510,306 (2019)
Clermont-Ferrand		France		507,479 (2019)

=== By country ===
Number of cities by country with urban areas over 500,000 inhabitants represented in the table
Country	No. of cities
Germany	19
France	17
Spain	15
Italy	14
Poland	7
Netherlands	5
Belgium	5
Czech Republic	3
Greece	2
Portugal	2
Sweden	2

== Top 30 urban areas by population ==
Location of the top 30 urban areas by population in the European Union

== See also ==
- List of cities in the European Union by population within city limits
- List of European cities by population within city limits
- List of urban areas in Europe
- List of metropolitan areas in Europe
- List of larger urban zones (metropolitan area)
- List of urban areas by population
- Blue Banana
- Golden Banana
