= Empty diagonal =

Band of low-density population in France

France's population density by department. The broken lines mark the approximate boundaries of the empty diagonal. The solid line is the Le Havre–Marseille line, to the east of which lives 60% of the French population.

The empty diagonal (French: diagonale du vide) is a band of low-density population that stretches from the French department of the Landes in the southwest to the Meuse in the northeast. The diagonal's population density is very low compared to the rest of France.

== Description ==
The low population density (less than 30/km^{2} or 78/sq mi) is caused largely by the rural exodus and urbanisation of the 19th and 20th centuries. Some commentators prefer to speak of a "low-density diagonal" (diagonale des faibles densités) and regard the term "empty diagonal" as both pejorative and exaggerated. Still, DATAR used the term and it remains the most common term.

The pattern is more readily apparent at the departmental level than at the regional level. It is part of a broader pattern of low population density that extends into Spain and Portugal and is known as the continental diagonal.

== History and evolution ==
Before the emergence of the empty diagonal, an earlier demographic feature was the Saint-Malo–Geneva line that ran from the northwest to the southeast and divided the industrial northeast from the agrarian southwest. Charles Dupin identified it in his 1837 treatise Forces productives et commerciales de la France.

In 1947, the geographer Jean-François Gravier wrote of a "French desert" that corresponds, more or less, to the modern notion of the empty diagonal.

Hervé Le Bras and Emmanuel Todd argue that the concept is no longer valid in the 21st century because of growth that is observed in some departments like Indre and Gers. According to their analysis, the zone of negligible or negative population growth extends only from the Massif Central to Lorraine. However, an analysis at the level of cantons and communes indicates that the zone of decline extends beyond the Massif–Lorraine axis and that the growth observed by Le Bras and Todd is fragile and driven by a temporary influx of retirees.

== Literature ==
La diagonale du vide is the title of a 2009 novel by Pierre Péju in which an urban businessman seeks solitude in a cottage in Ardèche.

From 2015 to 2016, the author and blogger Mathieu Mouillet spent 18 months exploring the empty diagonal and meeting its inhabitants. His "exotic voyage" is presented by notes and photographs on his blog.

== Gallery ==
Map of population density by department, showing the empty diagonal in blue

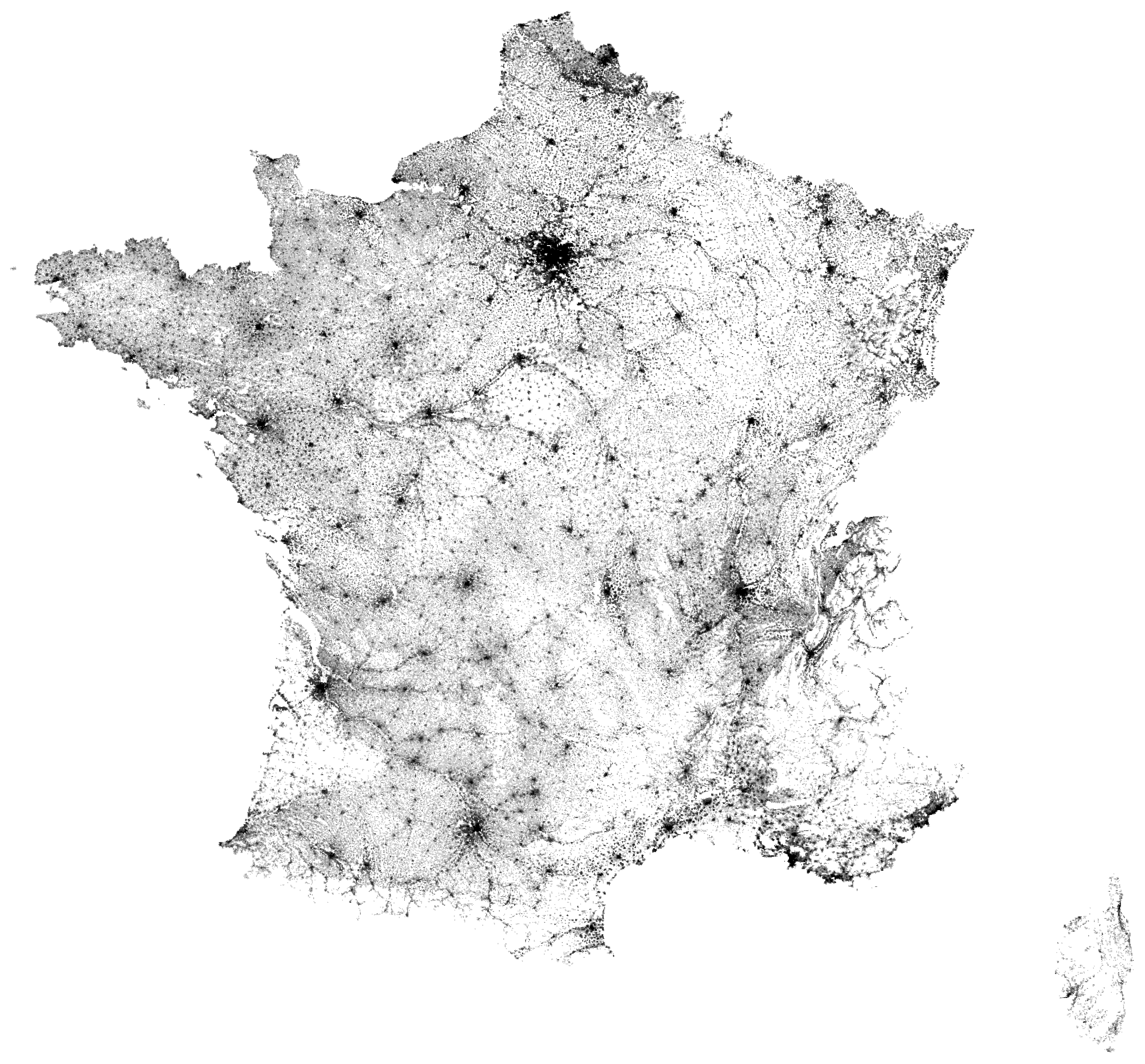
Detailed map of population density, with the least populated areas in white

== See also ==
- Arid Diagonal
- Rotten Banana
- Golden Banana
- Blue Banana
