= List of European cities by population within city limits =

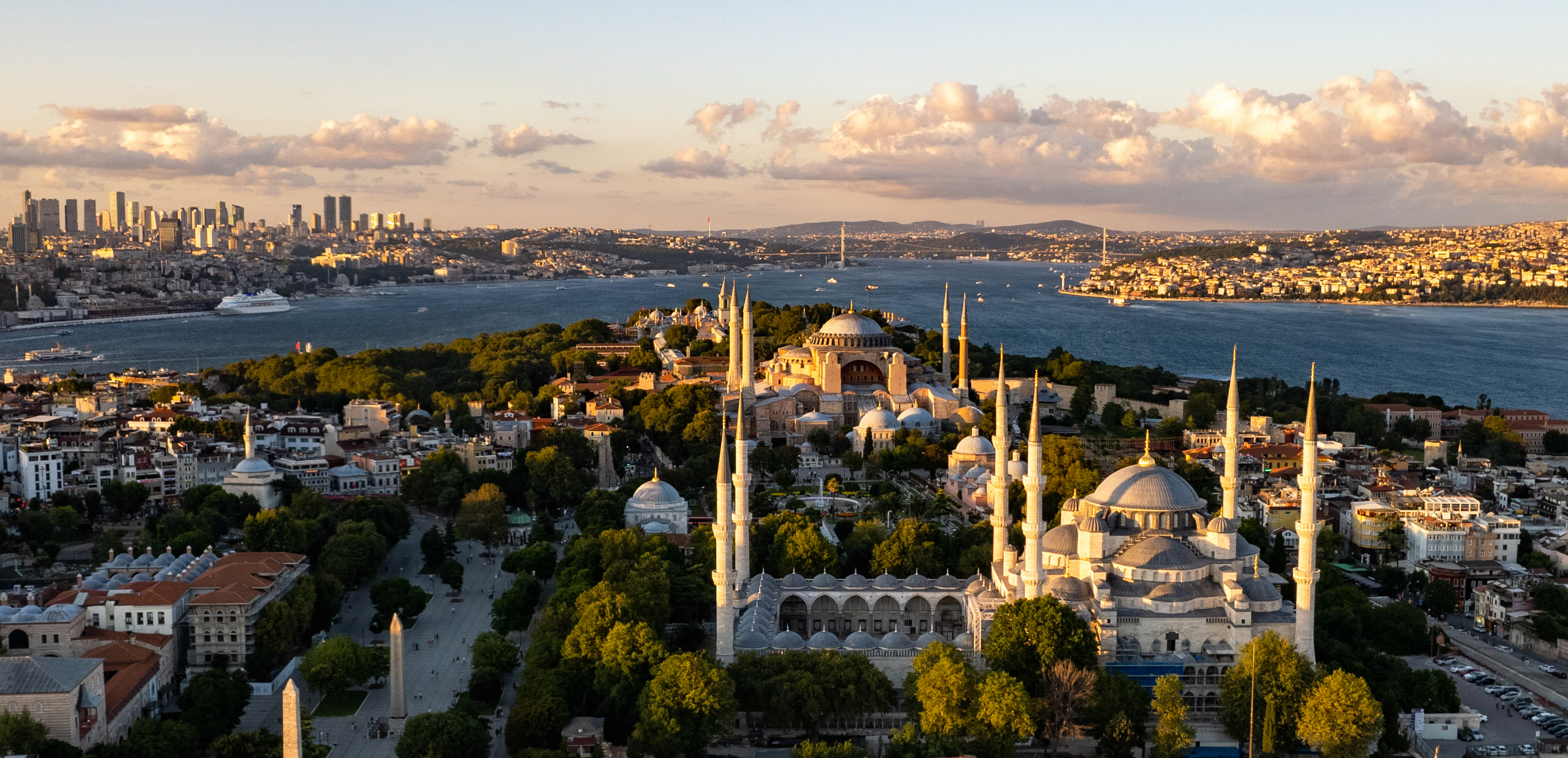
Istanbul skyline

This list ranks European cities by population within city limits. The largest cities in Europe have official populations of over one million inhabitants within their city boundaries. These rankings are based on populations contained within city administrative boundaries, as opposed to urban areas or metropolitan areas, which necessarily have larger populations than the cities at their core.

The limits of a city proper can differ greatly from the size of the city's urban area, so the figures in this list may not give an accurate view of the comparative population of different urban areas and should be treated with caution. For example, the Paris metropolitan area is the fourth most populous in Europe, but the strict definition of the administrative limits of the City of Paris results in a far lower population.

== Largest cities ==
Capital cities

City	Country	Official population	Date	Ref.
Istanbul (Note: Istanbul is a transcontinental city, with its commercial and historical centre and two-thirds of the population in Europe, the rest in Asia (see Districts of Istanbul for details).)	Turkey	15,754,053 (Note: Istanbul total (2025) = 15,754,053 Europe (25 districts) = 10,056,797 Asia (14 districts) = 5,697,256)	31 Dec 2025	
Moscow (Note: Moscow is the most populous city entirely within Europe.)	Russia	13,274,285	1 Jan 2025	
London (Note: Greater London, not the City of London)	United Kingdom	9,122,909	30 Jun 2025	
Saint Petersburg	Russia	5,652,922	1 Jan 2025	
Berlin	Germany	3,913,644	31 Dec 2025	
Madrid	Spain	3,506,730	1 Jan 2025	
Kyiv	Ukraine	2,952,301	1 Jan 2022	
Rome	Italy	2,745,062	1 Jan 2026	
Baku (Note: Continental placement may vary depending on geographic convention being followed.)	Azerbaijan	2,351,300	1 Jan 2025	
Paris	France	2,048,472	1 Jan 2025	
Vienna	Austria	2,041,286	1 Jul 2026	
Minsk	Belarus	1,995,091	1 Jan 2026	
Hamburg	Germany	1,869,786	31 Mar 2026	
Warsaw	Poland	1,866,729	31 Dec 2025	
Barcelona	Spain	1,731,649	1 Jan 2025	
Bucharest	Romania	1,709,458	1 Jan 2025	
Belgrade	Serbia	1,681,470	1 Jan 2025	
Budapest	Hungary	1,675,777	1 Jan 2026	
Munich	Germany	1,505,036	31 Dec 2025	
Kharkiv	Ukraine	1,421,225	1 Jan 2022	
Prague	Czech Republic	1,405,551	31 Mar 2026	
Tbilisi	Georgia	1,369,356	1 Jan 2026	
Milan	Italy	1,362,863	1 Jan 2026	
Kazan	Russia	1,329,825	1 Jan 2025	
Sofia	Bulgaria	1,303,813	31 Dec 2025	
Nizhny Novgorod	Russia	1,198,245	1 Jan 2025	
Ufa	Russia	1,166,098	1 Jan 2025	
Birmingham	United Kingdom	1,176,960	30 Jun 2025	
Krasnodar	Russia	1,154,885	1 Jan 2025	
Samara	Russia	1,154,223	1 Jan 2025	
Yerevan	Armenia	1,149,500	1 Jul 2026	
Rostov-on-Don	Russia	1,143,123	1 Jan 2025	
Voronezh	Russia	1,041,722	1 Jan 2025	
Perm	Russia	1,027,518	1 Jan 2025	
Cologne	Germany	1,025,523	31 Dec 2025	
Volgograd	Russia	1,012,219	1 Jan 2025	
Odesa	Ukraine	1,010,537	1 Jan 2022	
Stockholm	Sweden	1,000,962	30 Jun 2026	

== Map ==
Locations of cities in Europe with more than 1 million inhabitants

== See also ==
- List of urban areas in Europe
- List of metropolitan areas in Europe
- List of urban areas in the European Union
