= Rhine–Alpine Corridor =

Transport network in Europe

Route information
- Length: 1,300 km (810 mi)

Major junctions
- Start end: (Italy) Genoa
- End end: (Netherlands) Amsterdam

Location
- Countries: Italy; Switzerland; France; Germany; Belgium; Netherlands

Highway system
- International E-road network; A Class; B Class

The Rhine-Alpine Corridor is one of the ten priority corridors of the Trans-European Transport Network. It is a rail and roadway network.

It connects a total of five countries over 1,300 kilometers and connects Genoa in Italy with Rotterdam in the Netherlands. It mainly runs in the Blue Banana, a discontinuous corridor of urbanization in Western and Central Europe, with a population of around 100 million.

== Description ==
The corridor is divided into six sections:

- Genoa – Milan – Zurich – Basel
- Milan - Novara - Bern - Basel
- Basel - Strasbourg - Mannheim - Frankfurt - Cologne
- Cologne – Düsseldorf – Utrecht – Amsterdam
- Cologne - Liège - Brussels - Ghent - Bruges
- Liège - Antwerp - Rotterdam
