= Jean-François Gravier =

French geographer

Jean-François Gravier (French pronunciation: [ʒɑ̃ fʁɑ̃swa ɡʁavje]; 14 April 1915 – 11 November 2005) was a French geographer famous for his work Paris and the French Desert, first published in 1947, and republished in 1953 and 1972. He was the son of another geographer, Gaston Gravier. He denounces the extreme concentration of France in Paris, and the monopoly of that city over French resources. He was described as "a leading pioneer of planning in France" in a 2007 study.

== Quotation ==
"The Paris and its suburbs behaved, not like a metropolis vivifying its back-country, but like a monopolist group devouring his national substance." (Paris and the French desert, Paris, Portulan, 1947)

== Publications ==
- Régions et nation (1942)
- Paris and the French desert (1947, 1953, 1972)
- "Le Plan Monnet et le relèvement économique de la France" (1950)
- Décentralisation et progrès technique (1954)
- L'aménagement du territoire et l'avenir des régions françaises (1964)
- La question régionale (1970)
- L'espace vital: du paradis terrestre à l'aménagement du territoire (1983)

== See also ==
- Empty diagonal
- Regional planning
- Decentralization
