= Rotten Banana =

Economically depressed area of rural Denmark

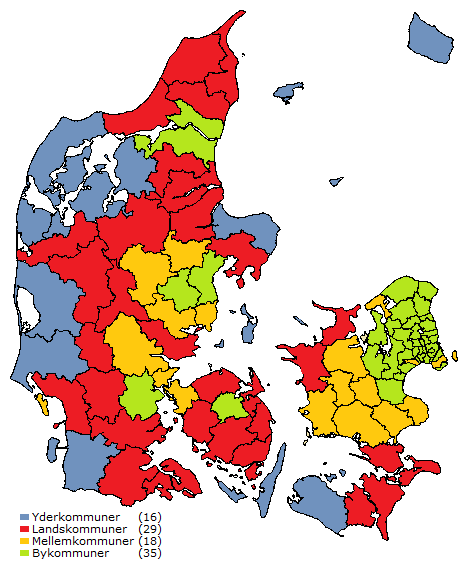
The outer municipalities in blue and red make up much of the area traditionally considered part of the Rotten Banana.

The Rotten Banana (Danish: Den rådne banan) is an informal area of rural Denmark facing significant economic disparities. The term Rotten Banana traditionally includes an area of Danish municipalities from the west coast of Jutland to Lolland-Falster islands in the southeast, forming a crescent shape reminiscent of a banana. This phenomenon has garnered media attention due to the stark economic disparities between these regions and more prosperous urban centers, like Copenhagen, Aarhus, and Odense.

The term was coined by Hanne W. Tanvig in the 1990s to draw attention to a contrasting phenomenon to the Blue Banana. The term, which holds a negative connotation, has been falling out of fashion, and media use of the term has declined. Tanvig regrets creating the term. In the time since the term was coined, studies have found that the area with highest unemployment has shrunken to primary west Zealand, Lolland, and Falster.

== See also ==
- Rust Belt – a term for a region in the United States marked by economic decline
- Empty Diagonal – a low-density population region in France
- Golden Banana
- Blue Banana
