= IATEUR =

Unit of the University of Reims

IATEUR (Institut d'aménagement des territoires, d'environnement et d'urbanisme de l'université de Reims) (Regional Planning, Environment and Urban Development Institute of the University of Reims) is a teaching and research unit of the University of Reims. It was founded in 1971 by Roger Brunet, then a professor of geography. IATEUR combines three major foci: planning, development and environment in order to provide a framework for sustainable urbanisation and heritage preservation.
