= RECLUS =

Public interest group (1984)

RECLUS (Réseau d'étude des changements dans les localisations et les unités spatiales) is a public interest group founded in 1984, associated to the Maison de la géographie de Montpellier (Geography House of Montpellier). The acronym translates to "Network for the study of changes in the locations and the spatial units" and was coined as a tribute to Élisée Reclus, the 19th-century French geographer, author of the New Universal Geography, a treatise in 19 volumes, published by Hachette, between 1876 and 1894 . One of the most important ideas of Reclus is indeed the trans-boundary region, which is retaken by Roger Brunet, the founder of the RECLUS group and its director until 1991, in order to formulate the concept of the European Megalopolis. Hérvé Théry was a Director of the institute
