= Roger Brunet =

French geographer

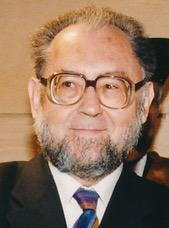
French geographer Roger Brunet in 1996

Roger Brunet (born March 30, 1931) is a French geographer.

== Life ==
Born in Toulouse, Brunet attended the University of Toulouse, where he earned his PhD in 1965. He was subsequently professor at the University of Reims from 1966 to 1976, where he founded IATEUR. He was a director of research at CNRS from 1976 to 1981, and from 1981 to 1984 served advisory and research roles in various French government ministries. In 1984, he founded the public interest group RECLUS, which he headed until 1991.

== Work ==
In the early 1970s, Brunet emerged as a leader in a movement to give academic geography a bigger role in practical issues, such as urban planning policies and secondary-school geography curricula, and founded the journal L'Espace géographique in 1972.

He was particularly associated with the development of the chorem, a cartographic approach to representing complex geographic information (including human geography) using a simplified set of spatial primitives. Chorems gained significant adoption in geography education, but also drew critics for allegedly oversimplifying and focusing too strongly on spatial representation. This cartographic approach to geography was, from the early 1980s, a rival to Yves Lacoste's geopolitical approach. Brunet founded the cartographic geography journal Mappemonde in 1986, which in turn was a rival to Lacoste's Hérodote.

In the popular press, the "blue banana" is one of his best-known productions. Developed in 1989 as part of a study overseen by Brunet that aimed to study French territory in its contemporary European context, the concept proposed that the backbone of Europe was formed by a curved axis of highly urbanized regions that bypassed France.
