= Minsk metropolitan area =

- Urban area
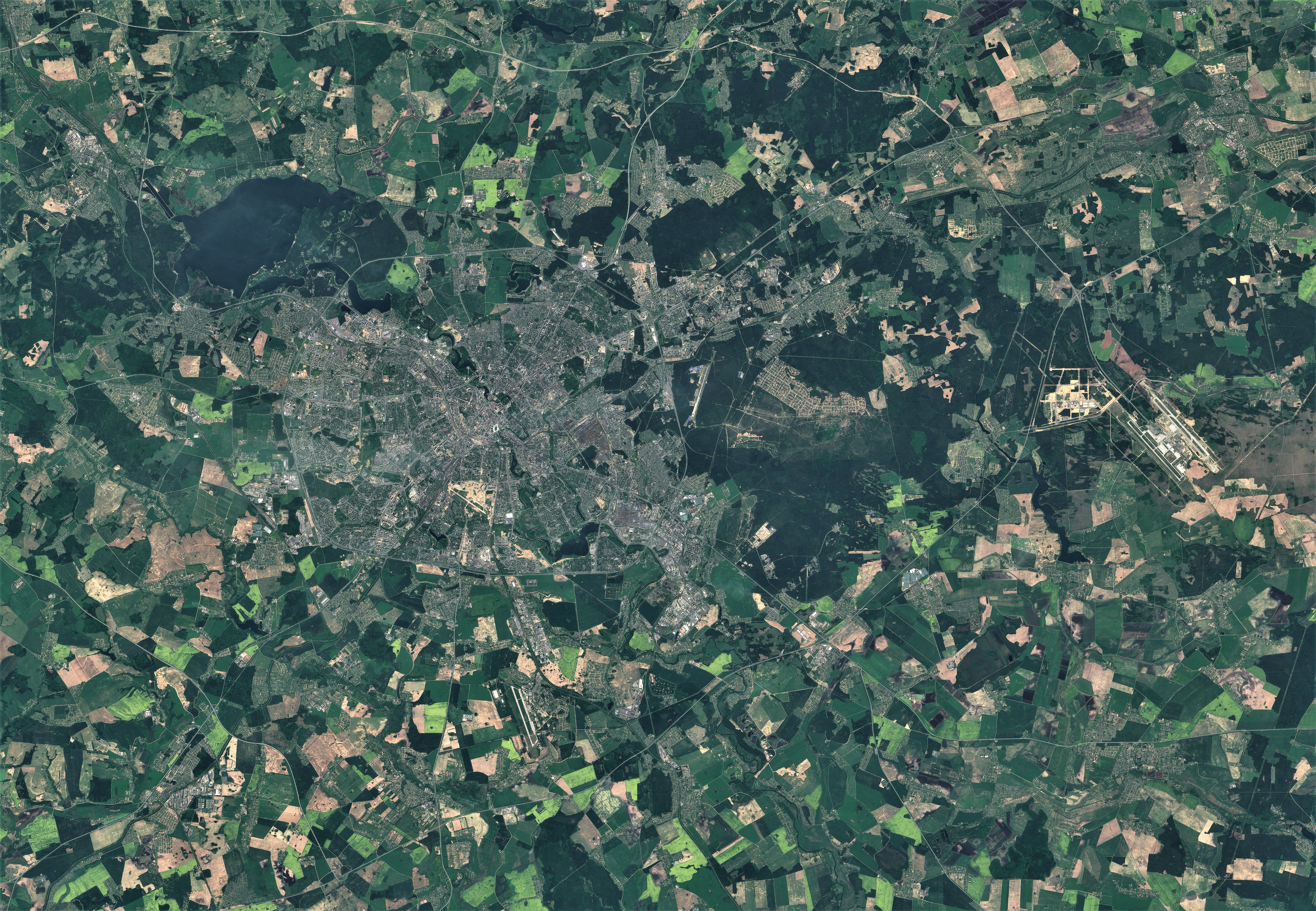
- Minsk metropolitan area from space

- Minsk metropolitan area (red) within Minsk Region
- Country: Belarus
- Largest city: Minsk

Area
  - Metro: 2,353 km^{2} (908 sq mi)

Population
  - Metro: 2,256,263
  - Metro density: 959/km^{2} (2,480/sq mi)

GDP
  - Total: Br 76.9 billion (€21.8 billion)
  - Per capita: Br 38,600 (€11,000)

The Minsk metropolitan area (known in Belarusian as: Мінская агламерацыя) is the metropolitan area of Minsk. The metropolitan area covers two districts: Minsk city and Minsk District.

The largest cities or towns within the metropolitan area are Minsk, Kolodishchi, Zaslawye, and Hatava.

== Economy ==
In 2024 Minsk's gross metropolitan product was around 77 billion BYN or around €22 billion.

== See also ==
- Economy of Belarus
