= Bucharest metropolitan area =

Bucharest Metropolitan Area
- Metropolitan area
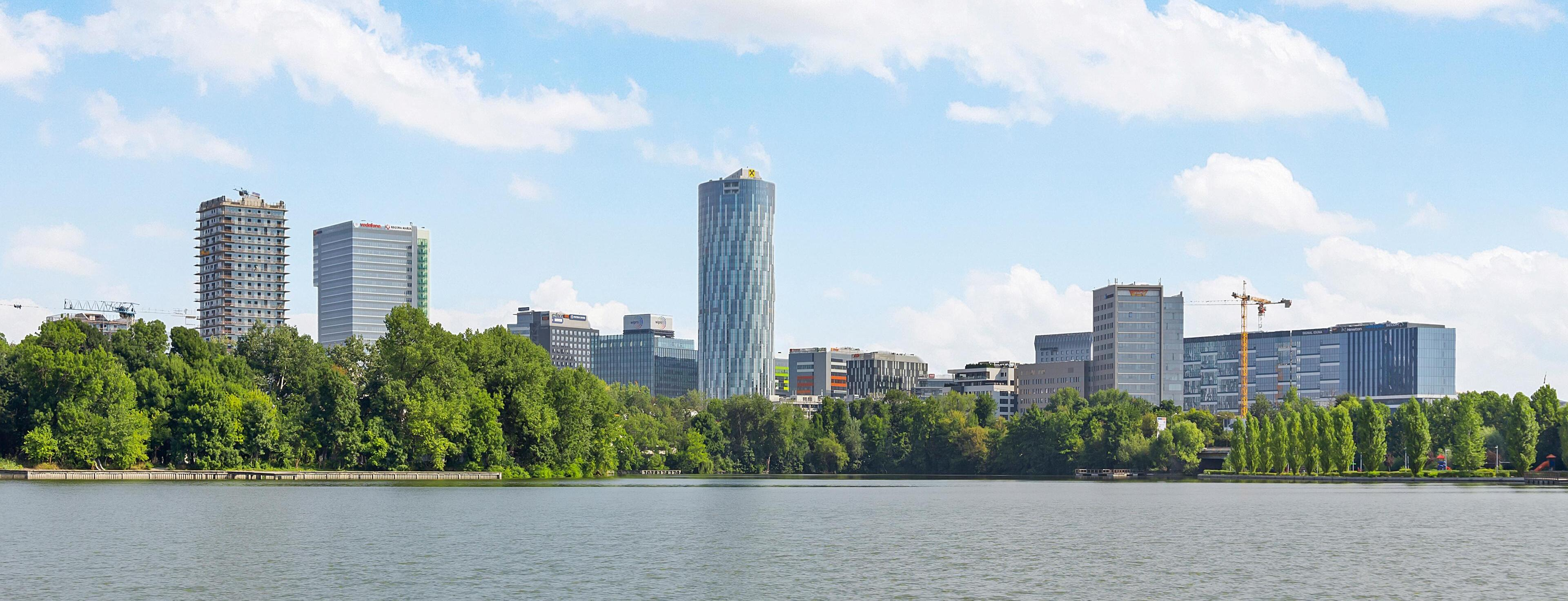
- Bucharest skyline
- Interactive map of Bucharest metropolitan area
- Country: Romania
- County: Ilfov, Călărași, Ialomița, Dâmbovița, Giurgiu
- Largest city: Bucharest
- Component localities: 40 (first stage); 62 (intermediate stage)
- Functional: 2016-2017

Area (first stage)
  - Total: 2,011 km^{2} (776 sq mi)

Population (2011 census)
  - Total: 2,402,163 (first stage)
  - Density: 1,200/km^{2} (3,100/sq mi)

GDP
  - Total: €104.409 billion (2024)
  - Per capita: €45,140 (2024)
- Time zone: UTC+2 (EET)
  - Summer (DST): UTC+3 (EEST)
- Postal Code: 0 S NNNN^{1}
- Area code: +40 x1^{2}
- Website: BMA official site
- ^{1}S is the number of the Sector, and NNNN is used to differentiate between streets and/or subzones.^{2}x is a digit indicating the operator: 2 for the former national operator, Romtelecom, and 3 for the other ground telephone networks.

The Bucharest Metropolitan Area (Romanian: Zona Metropolitană București) is a metropolitan area project formally established in 2017 that includes Bucharest, the capital city of Romania, and surrounding communes. If completed, it would have a population of about 2.4 million, only slightly larger than that of the city proper (2,0 million). It would also be a member of the METREX network.

According to Eurostat, Bucharest has a functional urban area of 2,412,540 residents (as of 2015).

== History ==
The "Metropolitan Area" project was initiated in 2003. A survey in 2008 showed that about 70% of the population of the area favours the project. The city proper has now 228 km^{2}, but the metropolitan zone would reach 1,800 km^{2} in a first phase. A possible name for it will probably be "Greater Bucharest".

In an initial stage, the zone would include Bucharest and Ilfov County. Then, there are several plans to further increase the "Metropolitan Area of Bucharest" to about 20 times the area of the city proper (from 228 km^{2} to 5,046 km^{2}). It would include 6 cities and 87 communes from the Ilfov, Giurgiu and Călărași counties, and would extend all the way towards the border with Bulgaria in the south, and towards the Prahova County in the north. In an intermediate stage, the extension of the zone would include 62 out of the proposed 93 candidate localities. The "Bucharest Metropolitan Area" may become the biggest port on the Danube upon completion of the Danube–Bucharest Canal.

The enlarged "Metropolitan Area" Council will have 105 councilors, twice as many are now, and the Government will appoint a governor, a position which would be homologized to the prefect of Bucharest.

== Subdivisions ==
Hierarchy of planning bodies	Major localities	Area (first stage)	Population (first stage)	Area (intermediate stage)	Population (intermediate stage)
Bucharest		228 km^{2}	1,883,425	228 km^{2}	1,883,425
Ilfov County (all localities)		1,285 km^{2}	388,738	1,285 km^{2}	388,738
↓	Voluntari	37 km^{2}	42,944	37 km^{2}	42,944
	Pantelimon	69 km^{2}	25,596	69 km^{2}	25,596
	Buftea	55 km^{2}	22,178	55 km^{2}	22,178
	Popești-Leordeni	56 km^{2}	21,895	56 km^{2}	21,895
	Bragadiru	22 km^{2}	15,329	22 km^{2}	15,329
	Chitila	13 km^{2}	14,184	13 km^{2}	14,184
	Otopeni	32 km^{2}	13,861	32 km^{2}	13,861
	Măgurele	45 km^{2}	11,041	45 km^{2}	11,041
Giurgiu County (11 localities)				656 km^{2}	65,825
↓	Bolintin-Vale			41 km^{2}	12,929
	Mihăilești			69 km^{2}	7,923
Călărași County (5 localities)				295 km^{2}	23,492
↓	Fundulea			23 km^{2}	6,851
Dâmbovița County (3 localities)				206 km^{2}	16,059
Ialomița County (2 localities)				56 km^{2}	4,054
BMA		1,811 km^{2}	2,272,163	2,726 km^{2}	2,381,593

== Economy ==
In 2020 Bucharest's gross metropolitan product was €61 billion. This puts Bucharest in 37th place among cities in European Union.
