= Functional urban area =

Measure of metropolitan and surrounding areas

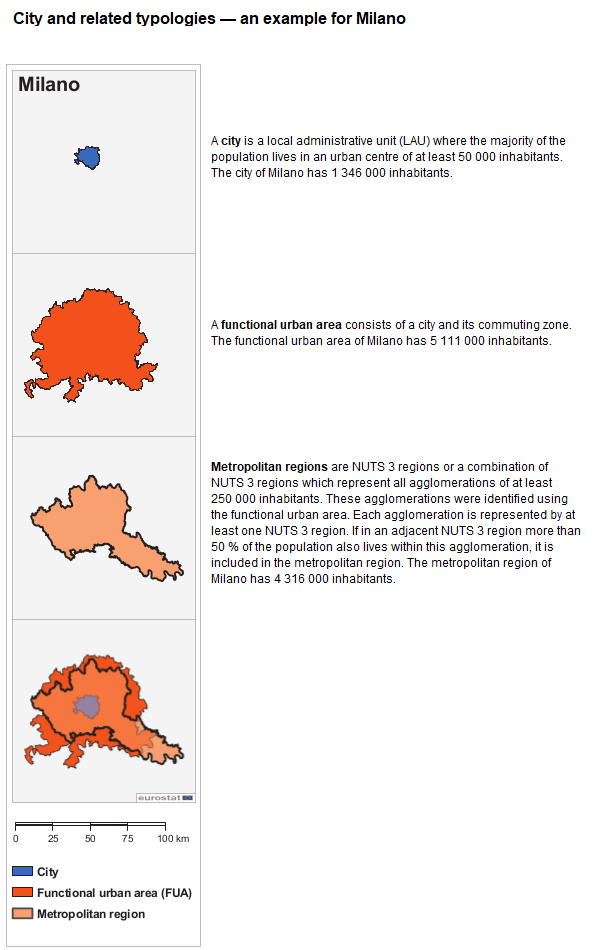
Illustration of the difference between the city, the functional urban area (Milan metropolitan area), and the metropolitan region of Milan

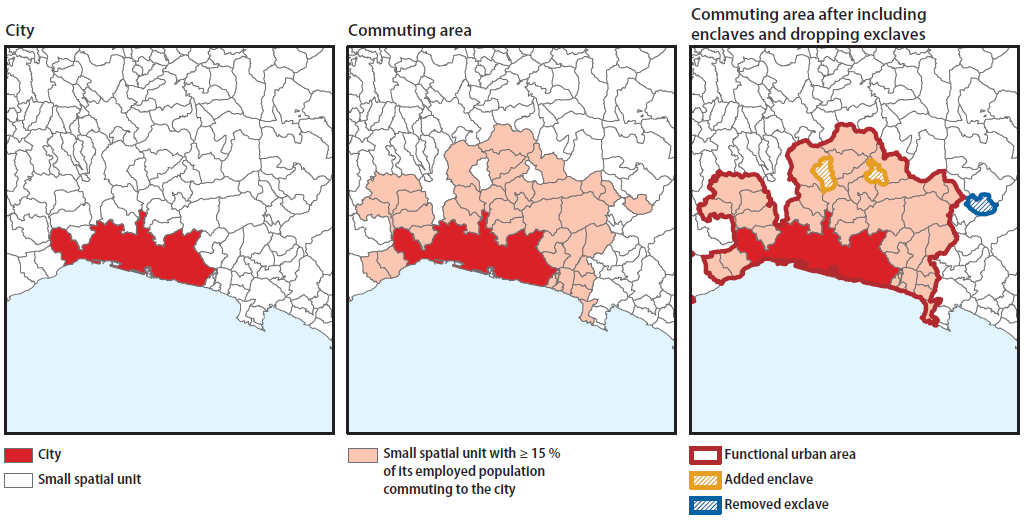
Illustration of the delimitation process for the functional urban area (red outline) of Genoa (red fill) and its commuting zone (pink fill)

The functional urban area (FUA), previously known as larger urban zone (LUZ), is a measure of the population and expanse of metropolitan and surrounding areas, which may or may not be exclusively urban. It consists of a city and its commuting zone, which is a contiguous area of spatial units that have at least 15% of their employed residents working in the city.

The FUA represents an attempt at a harmonised definition of the metropolitan area. Eurostat's objective was to have an area from which a significant share of the residents commute into the city, a concept known as the "functional urban region". To ensure a good data availability, Eurostat adjusts the FUA boundaries to administrative boundaries that approximate the functional urban area.

== History ==
The definition was introduced under the name Larger urban zone (LUZ) in 2004 by Eurostat, the statistical agency of the European Union (EU), in agreement with the national statistics offices in the member states. Eurostat data is provided only for zones in the EU countries, candidate countries and EFTA countries. Several cities were excluded by definition from the 2004 list of LUZs on technical, definitional grounds, such as the coincidence of the metropolitan area with the urban zone.

In 2006 LUZ definitions were changed significantly, improving the comparability of LUZ definitions across different countries, and allowing for almost all cities to be included.

In 2011, the European Commission has developed a new definition of LUZ in cooperation with the OECD. The term Larger urban zone (LUZ) was later renamed as the Functional urban area (FUA).

In 2020, the Food and Agriculture Organization, the United Nations Human Settlements Programme, the International Labour Organization, and the World Bank have also adopted the Functional urban area as their definition for delimitation of metropolitan areas.

== List of functional urban areas in Europe ==
This is a list of functional urban areas. The Urban Audit also includes cities from EFTA countries (Iceland, Liechtenstein, Norway and Switzerland) and EU candidate countries. The Organisation for Economic Co-operation and Development (OECD) uses a similar definition of Functional Urban Area to represent population sizes of cities in OECD countries. This data is also included.

The figures in the Eurostat database are an attempt at a compromise between harmonised data for all of the European Union, and with availability of statistical data, making comparisons more accurate.

Areas outside of the European Union

Functional urban area	Country	OECD Population (2014)	Eurostat Population (2006)	Eurostat Population (2016)
Amsterdam metropolitan area	Netherlands	2,452,659	2,497,000 (Note: Part of the Randstad polycentric urban region consisting of the metropolitan areas of Amsterdam, Rotterdam, The Hague, and Utrecht (982,000). The total population of the region is 7,100,000.)	2,771,661
Antwerp	Belgium	1,081,904	1,406,000 (Note: The Flemish Diamond metropolitan region, which consists of the metropolitan areas of Brussels, Antwerp, Gent, and Leuven, has a total population of 5,103,000.)	1,100,139
Athens	Greece	3,535,055	3,761,000	3,863,763
Barcelona metropolitan area	Spain	3,846,697	4,082,000 (Note: Total population is 4,251,000 if the metropolitan area of Mataro (169,000) is included.)	5,445,616
Berlin	Germany	4,399,542	4,016,000	5,005,216
Bilbao	Spain	1,013,805	947,000	1,025,109
Birmingham (West Midlands)	United Kingdom	1,957,078	3,701,107	2,332,629
Bordeaux	France	1,175,699	No data	1,244,264
Bremen	Germany	1,027,192	1,077,000	1,244,363
Bristol	United Kingdom	836,621	1,041,000	1,090,080
Brussels-Capital Region	Belgium	2,588,102	2,639,000	2,625,525
Bucharest metropolitan area	Romania	2,402,530	2,158,558	2,403,107
Budapest metropolitan area	Hungary	2,879,601	2,523,000	2,993,948
Cardiff	United Kingdom	664,861	1,097,000	1,085,526
Copenhagen	Denmark	2,025,171	1,881,000 (Note: Part of the wider Öresund region, which includes the Swedish metropolitan area of Malmö (961,000). The total regional population is 2,842,000.)	1,893,010
Dublin Metropolitan Area	Ireland	1,836,119	1,261,332	1,263,035
Frankfurt/Rhine-Main Region	Germany	2,533,311	2,764,000 (Note: Part of the Rhein-Main metropolitan region with a total population of 4,149,000, which additionally includes the metropolitan areas of Darmstadt (501,000), Wiesbaden (453,000), and Mainz (431,000).)	2,573,745
Gdańsk	Poland	1,105,467	No data	1,141,954 (Note: 2014 data)
Greater Glasgow	United Kingdom	967,101	1,395,000	1,789,003
Metropolitan Gothenburg	Sweden	1,015,974	No data	1,006,548 (Note: 2017 data)
The Hague	Netherlands	906,897	1,404,000	1,070,027
Hamburg Metropolitan Region	Germany	3,008,841	2,983,000	3,173,871
Hanover	Germany	1,217,511	No data	1,300,687
Helsinki Metropolitan Area	Finland	1,498,050	1,285,000	1,532,309
Katowice metropolitan area	Poland	2,589,349	3,029,000 (Note: Part of the polycentric Upper Silesian urban region with a total population of 5,294,000. The region additionally includes the metropolitan areas of Ostrava (1,046,000), Bielsko-Biała (584,000) and Rybnik (526,000).)	2,743,929
Kraków metropolitan area	Poland	1,362,740	1,236,000	1,276,438
West Yorkshire (Leeds – Bradford)	United Kingdom	1,774,552 (Note: Leeds and Bradford counted separately.)	2,302,000	2,238,127
Lille–Kortrijk–Tournai	France/ Belgium	1,363,465 (Note: Kortrijk not included.)	1,379,000 (Note: Part of the wider Lille-Bassin Minier region with a total population of 3,115,000.)	2,572,374
Lisbon metropolitan area	Portugal	3,039,662	2,791,000	2,839,908
Liverpool/Birkenhead	United Kingdom	954,181	2,241,000	1,352,000
Łódź	Poland	939,568	1,165,000	1,116,660
London metropolitan area	United Kingdom	11,701,236	13,109,000	12,250,000
Lyon	France	1,960,847	1,669,000	2,188,759
Madrid metropolitan area	Spain	7,079,173	5,263,000	6,378,297
Greater Manchester	United Kingdom	1,935,559	2,556,000	2,615,144
Mannheim	Germany	1,230,276	No data	1,172,821
Marseille	France	1,773,503	1,530,000	1,750,885 (Note: 2014 data)
Milan metropolitan area	Italy	4,159,854	4,136,000 (Note: Part of a wider polycentric urban region with a population of 6,011,000.)	4,267,946
Munich	Germany	2,965,871	2,665,000 (Note: When combined with the Augsburg metropolitan area (606,000), the region has a total population of 3,271,000.)	2,808,581
Naples metropolitan area	Italy	4,475,682	4,654,259 (Note: Part of a wider polycentric urban region with a population of 3,714,000.)	4,127,390
Nice	France	865,195	1,082,000	1,017,307
Nottingham-Derby	United Kingdom	863,918	1,614,000	1,927,550
Nuremberg	Germany	1,169,367	1,443,000	1,301,504
Greater Oslo	Norway	1,299,955	1,037,000	1,144,883
Ostrava	Czech Republic	no data	no data	1,119,593 (Note: 2015)
Paris metropolitan area	France	12,037,889	13,975,000	12,824,000
Porto Metropolitan Area	Portugal	1,737,829	1,245,000 (Note: Part of a wider polycentric urban region with a population of 1,778,000.)	1,286,111
Portsmouth-Southampton	United Kingdom	594,455	1,547,000	1,498,402 (Note: Excludes Southampton)
Prague	Czech Republic	1,910,396	1,669,000	2,224,080 (Note: 2015)
Rhein-Nord (Note: Polycentric metropolitan area) (Düsseldorf – Neuss)	Germany	1,427,823 (Note: Excludes Neuss.)	3,073,000 (Note: Part of the polycentric urban region of Rhein-Ruhr, which has a total population of 12,190,000.)	1,527,176
Rhein-Süd (Cologne – Bonn)	Germany	1,926,073 (Note: Excludes Bonn which has a population of 750,370)	3,070,000	3,023,545 (Note: Excludes Bonn)
Riga	Latvia	No data	1,195,000	1,089,767
Rome metropolitan area	Italy	4,149,364	4,353,738	3,700,000
Rotterdam	Netherlands	1,509,373	1,904,000	1,818,563
Ruhr area	Germany	No data (Note: Essen, Bochum, and Dortmund counted separately.)	5,376,000	5,045,784
Saarbrücken – Forbach	Germany/ France	570,479 (Note: Saarbrücken only)	1,102,000	822,128
Seville	Spain	1,500,644	1,180,000 (Note: Total population is 1,262,000 if the metropolitan area of Utrera (82,000) is included.)	1,877,060
Sofia	Bulgaria	No data	1,260,120	1,543,377
Metropolitan Stockholm	Sweden	2,018,208	2,171,000	2,034,354
South Yorkshire (Sheffield)	United Kingdom	920,128	1,569,000	1,596,298
Stuttgart Metropolitan Region	Germany	1,965,942	2,289,000	2,678,795
Thessaloniki metropolitan area	Greece	975,439	1,052,000	1,166,914
Toulouse	France	1,309,149	No data	1,388,978
Turin metropolitan area	Italy	1,774,507	1,601,000 (Note: Total population is 1,716,000 if the metropolitan of Pinerolo is included.)	2,302,353
Newcastle-Sunderland	United Kingdom	1,082,729 (Note: Excludes Sunderland)	1,599,000	1,141,879
Valencia	Spain	1,668,153	1,398,000 (Note: Total population is 1,499,000 if the metropolitan area of Sagunto is included.)	2,516,818
Vienna	Austria	2,793,631	2,584,000	2,339,807
Warsaw metropolitan area	Poland	3,037,890	2,785,000	3,304,641
Zagreb	Croatia	No data	1,107,115	1,123,374
Zürich metropolitan area	Switzerland	1,246,968	1,615,000	1,984,534

=== List of functional urban areas in Europe by population ===
This is a list of functional urban areas by population as of 2017. The 2004 Urban Audit also includes cities from EFTA countries (Iceland, Liechtenstein, Norway and Switzerland) and EU candidate countries, although the only candidate country for which there is available data is Turkey. Some cities, including Marseille, Lille, Nice, Cordoba, Badajoz, Toulon and Montpellier were excluded from the 2004 list on technical, definitional grounds, such as the coincidence of the metropolitan area with the urban zone.

Areas outside of the European Union

Rank	Functional urban area	Country	Population	Area (km^{2})
1	Paris	France	13,998,000	12,079.87
2	Istanbul	Turkey	11,154,928	
3	London	United Kingdom	10,345,124	8,900
4	Madrid	Spain	5,804,829	8,022
5	Ruhr Area	Germany	5,302,179	4,435
6	Berlin	Germany	4,971,331	17,385
7	Naples	Italy	4,475,682	564.95
8	Barcelona	Spain	4,233,638	1,796.64
9	Athens	Greece	4,013,368	3,806.92
10	Ankara	Turkey	3,736,359	
11	Rome	Italy	3,457,690	3,666.66
12	Hamburg	Germany	3,134,620	7,304
12	Milan	Italy	3,076,643	1,348.32
13	Manchester	United Kingdom	2,948,633	1,280
14	Katowice metropolitan area	Poland	2,710,397	2,650.65
15	Stuttgart	Germany	2,663,660	3,654
16	Warsaw	Poland	2,631,710	5,201.72
17	Munich	Germany	2,531,706	5,504
18	Frankfurt	Germany	2,517,561	4,305
19	İzmir	Turkey	2,459,474	
20	Lisbon	Portugal	2,435,837	1,432.49
21	Budapest	Hungary	2,393,846	2,538
22	Leeds	United Kingdom	2,393,300	5,114
23	Birmingham	United Kingdom	2,357,100	1,598
24	Vienna	Austria	2,179,769	4,610.93
25	Bucharest	Romania	2,140,194	662
26	Prague	Czech Republic	1,964,750	6,977
27	Cologne	Germany	1,873,580	1,626
28	Stockholm	Sweden	1,860,872	6,519
29	Copenhagen	Denmark	1,806,667	2,759
30	Brussels	Belgium	1,800,663	1,613.91
31	Glasgow	United Kingdom	1,747,100	3,346
32	Turin	Italy	1,745,221	1,878.97
33	Lyon	France	1,717,300	5,997.68
34	Belgrade	Serbia	1,683,962	3,223
35	Valencia	Spain	1,564,145	1,440.58
36	Dublin	Republic of Ireland	1,535,446	
37	Düsseldorf	Germany	1,525,029	1,201
38	Bursa	Turkey	1,474,482	
39	Amsterdam	Netherlands	1,443,258	859.28
40	Adana	Turkey	1,394,130	
41	Liverpool	United Kingdom	1,365,900	821
42	Bielefeld	Germany	1,297,876	2,921
43	Hanover	Germany	1,294,447	2,966
44	Nuremberg	Germany	1,288,797	2,934
45	Sheffield	United Kingdom	1,277,100	1,846
46	Kraków	Poland	1,264,322	2,988.65
47	Sofia	Bulgaria	1,263,807	3,424.2
48	Seville	Spain	1,249,346	3,081.9
49	Bremen	Germany	1,249,291	5,885
50	Helsinki	Finland	1,224,107	2,969.94
51	Rotterdam	Netherlands	1,186,818	611.75
52	Łódź	Poland	1,163,516	2,857.51
53	Ostrava	Czech Republic	1,153,876	3,889.6
54	Zürich	Switzerland	1,110,478	1,086.14
55	Tricity	Poland	1,105,203	3,457.32
56	Porto	Portugal	1,099,040	562.32
57	Oslo	Norway	1,090,513	6,920
58	Newcastle upon Tyne	United Kingdom	1,055,600	3,385
59	Gaziantep	Turkey	1,052,795	
60	Toulouse	France	1,052,497	4,706.93
61	Wrocław	Poland	1,031,439	4,582.2
62	Poznań	Poland	1,018,511	3,719.2
63	Gothenburg	Sweden	1,015,974	3,694.86
64	Bristol	United Kingdom	1,006,600	1,635
65	Riga	Latvia	1,003,949	5,382.5

== See also ==
- List of cities in the European Union by population within city limits
- List of urban areas in the European Union
- List of metropolitan areas in Europe
- Largest metropolitan areas in the Nordic countries
- World's largest cities
- List of functional urban areas in New Zealand
