= Cologne Bonn Region =

Metropolitan area in North Rhine-Westphalia, Germany

Coordinates: 50°50′N 7°00′E

Cologne Bonn region Region Köln-Bonn
- Flag

- Location of the Cologne Bonn region in Germany
- Country: Germany
- State: North Rhine-Westphalia
- Largest cities: Cologne; Bonn

Area
  - Metro: 3,839 km^{2} (1,482 sq mi)

Population (2007)
  - Metro: 3,130,000
  - Metro density: 815/km^{2} (2,110/sq mi)

GDP
  - Metro: €95.3 billion
- Time zone: UTC+1 (CET)
- Website: www.region-koeln-bonn.de

The Cologne Bonn Region (German: Region Köln/Bonn) is a metropolitan area in North Rhine-Westphalia (NRW), Germany, covering the cities of Cologne, Bonn and Leverkusen, as well as the districts of Rheinisch-Bergischer Kreis, Oberbergischer Kreis, Rhein-Erft-Kreis and Rhein-Sieg-Kreis. The region covers an area of 3,839 km^{2} with 3.13 million inhabitants (population density 815/km^{2}). The city centres of Cologne and Bonn are 24 kilometres apart. At the outer city limits, there are only eight kilometres between Cologne-Libur and Bonn-Geislar.

The Cologne/Bonn Region was established by local governments within the Cologne Government Region in 1992, to promote common policies in regional and urban planning, traffic management, environment and investment. Among the most prominent co-operative projects are the Cologne/Bonn Airport, the Verkehrsverbund Rhein-Sieg and the former Bonn–Cologne Railway Company. Also the Stadtbahn of both cities are connected, so there are light rail trains from Cologne Stadtbahn in Bonn and the Bonn Stadtbahn in Cologne. The largest local banks, Sparkasse KölnBonn and Volksbank Köln Bonn, operate in both cities. Both cities are directly connected by the autobahn A555.

The Cologne/Bonn region lies within the larger Rhine-Ruhr region, and forms a counterbalance to the more integrated Ruhr area, which also lies within the Rhine-Ruhr. Since 2008, studies have been undertaken to incorporate cities of the Lower Rhine region (most notably the city of Düsseldorf) into the alliance, in order to form a Rhineland metropolitan region (Metropolregion Rheinland).

== Larger Urban Zones ==
Eurostat's Urban Audit splits the Cologne/Bonn region into two Larger Urban Zones (LUZ). These two Urban Zones do not cover the district of Oberbergischer Kreis.

Larger Urban Zone	major cities	area	population
Cologne Larger Urban Zone		1,627 km^{2}	1,994,524
	Cologne	405 km^{2}	1,085,664
	Bergisch Gladbach	83 km^{2}	111,966
	Leverkusen	79 km^{2}	163,838
Bonn Larger Urban Zone		1,295 km^{2}	924,546
	Bonn	141 km^{2}	327,258
Cologne/Bonn Region		2,922 km^{2}	2,919,070

Population figures for 2012

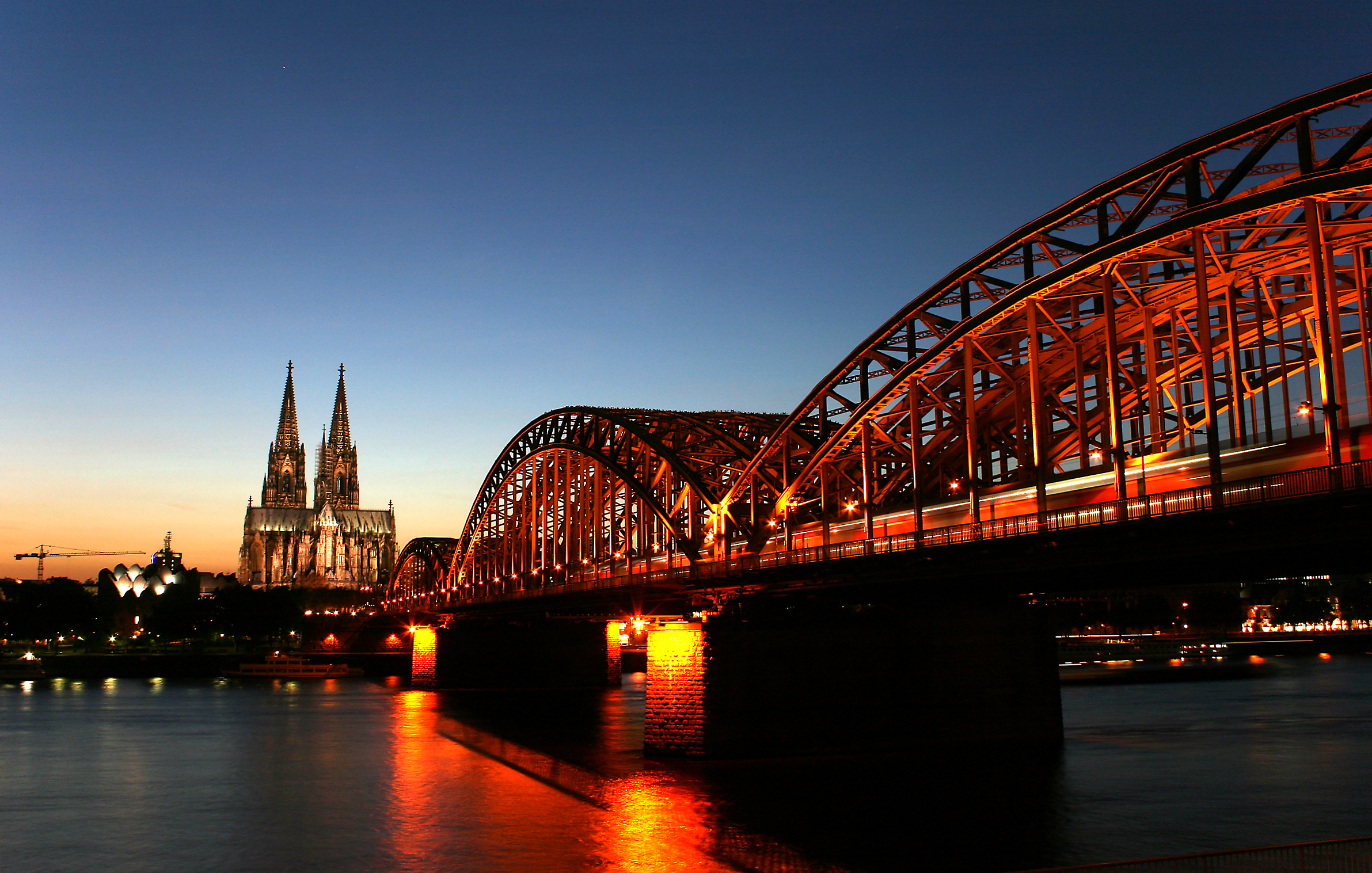
Cologne

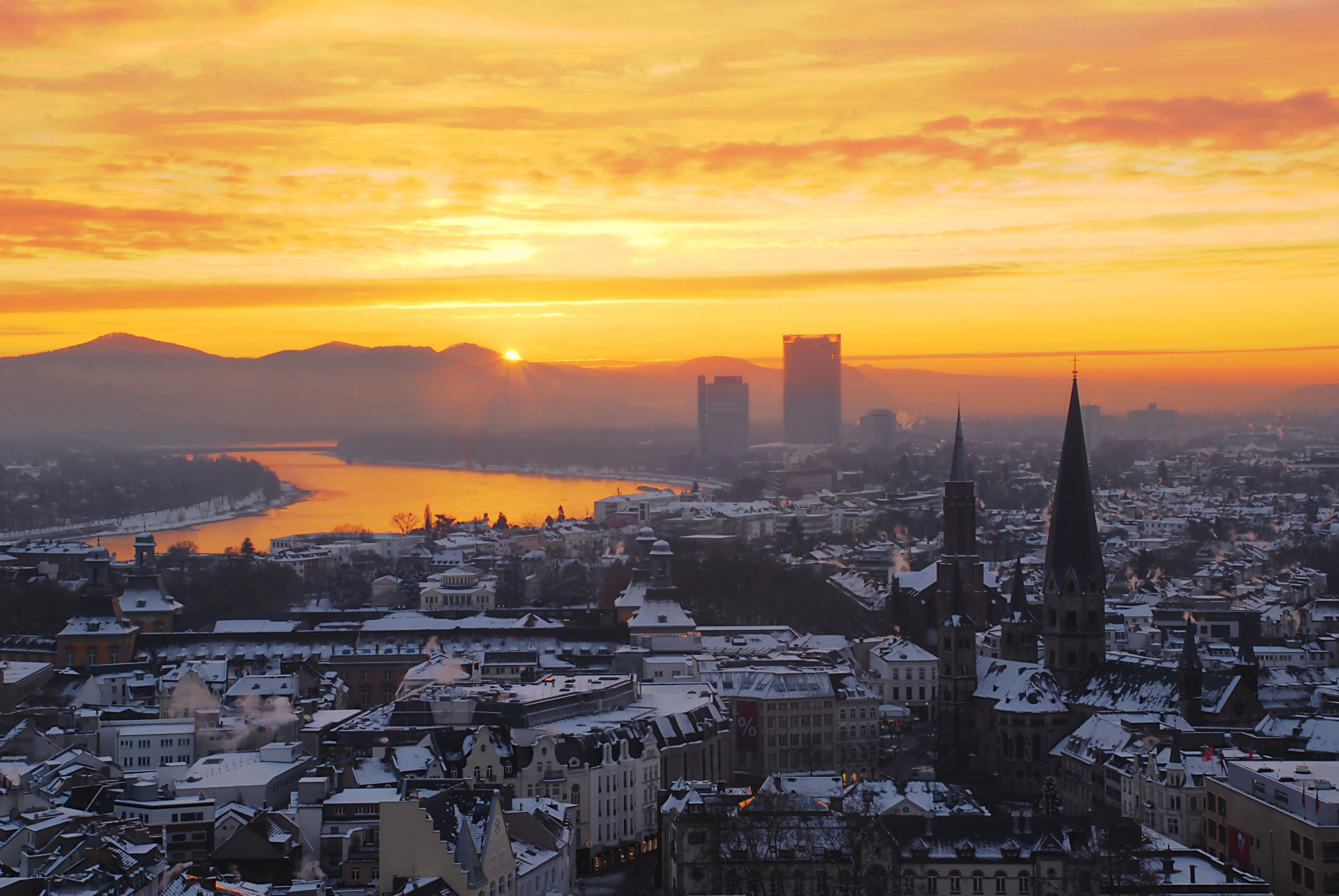
Bonn

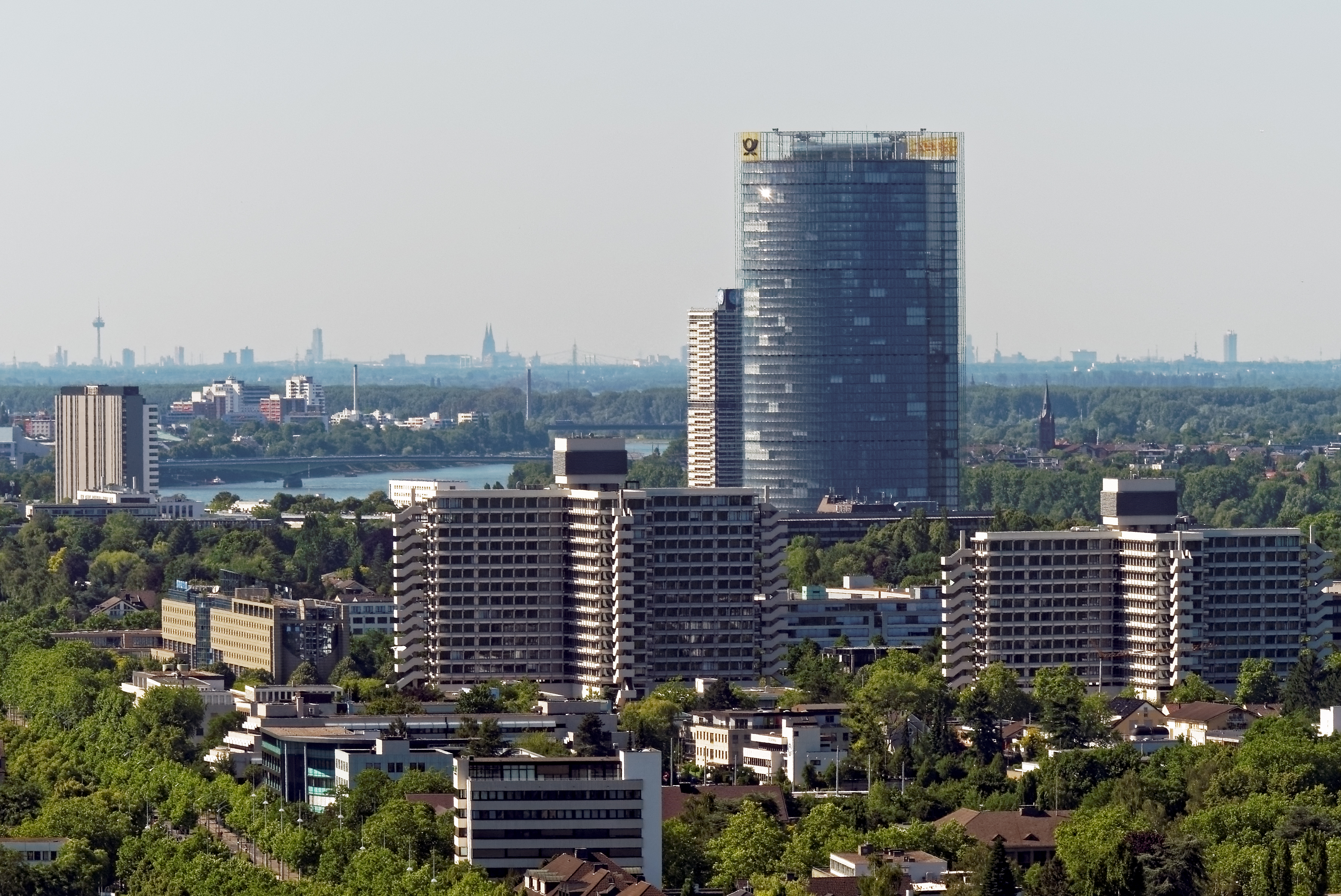
Bonn with Cologne's skyline

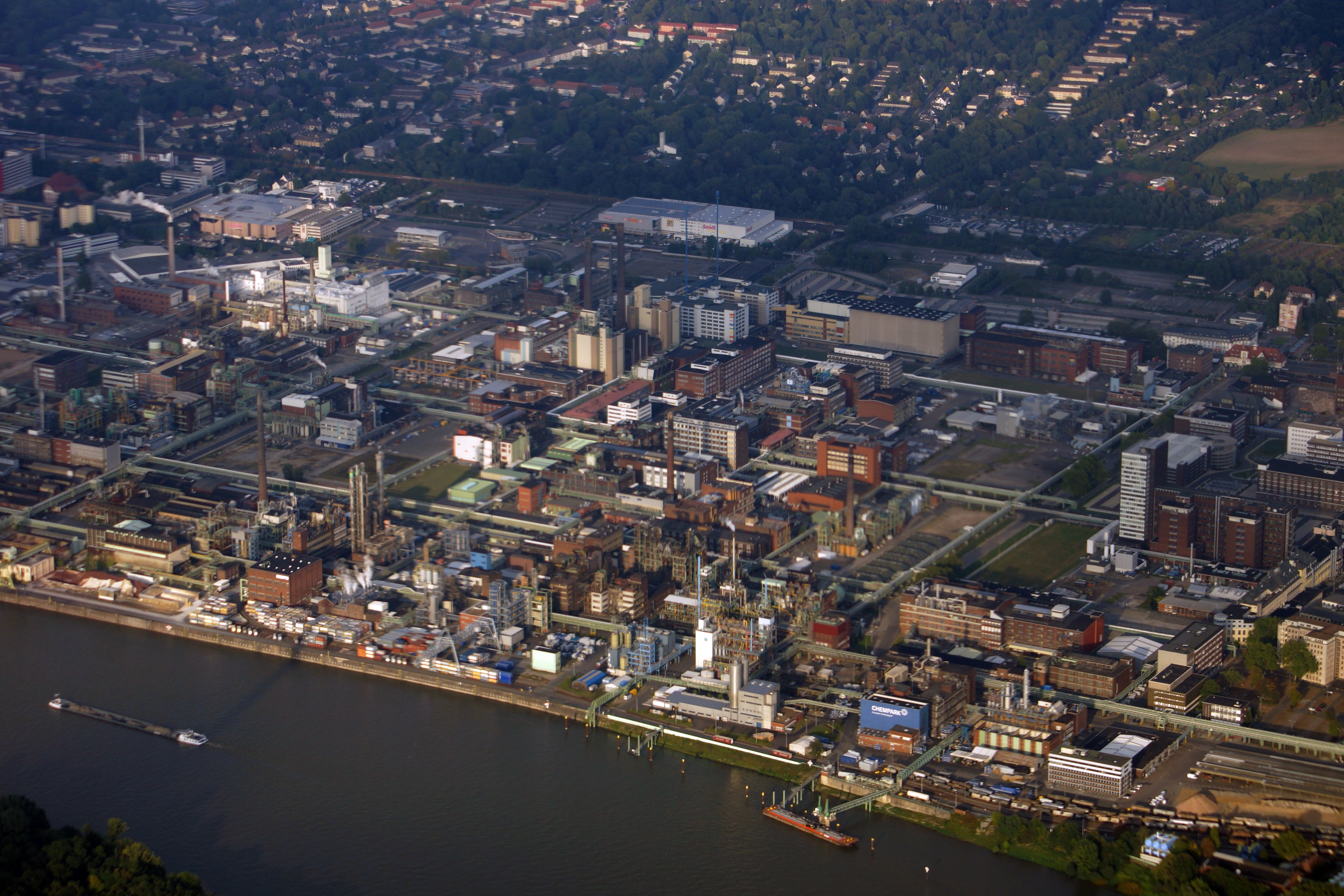
Leverkusen

== See also ==
- Rhine-Ruhr Metropolitan Region
- Ruhr Metropolitan Region
- Metropolitan regions in Germany
