= Four Motors for Europe =

Cooperative network of regions in France, Germany, Spain, and Italy

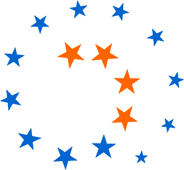
Logo

The Four Motors for Europe is a transnational, interregional network of four highly industrialized and research-oriented regions in Europe. Rhône-Alpes of France, Baden-Württemberg of Germany, Catalonia of Spain and Lombardy of Italy signed an agreement of cooperation on September 9, 1988, in Stuttgart, Germany. The so-called Memorandum sets out to increase economic and social cooperation between the regions, which do not possess a common border. The agreement was to have the four regions cooperate in a long term relationship in the fields of science, research, education, environment, culture, and other sectors. The purpose of this relationship was to foster the regional dimension within the European Union as well as increasing the potential for economic growth within the four regions. These regions focus on the exchange of information with each other to expand their technology and R&D. The group works selectively with associated partners.

Map of the Four Motors for Europe (in light blue), on a map of EU27 (2007–2013)

The Four Motors have since expanded to include Wales of the United Kingdom, Flanders of Belgium, Lesser Poland of Poland and Quebec of Canada as associate members, while Rhône-Alpes merged with Auvergne in 2016, to create Auvergne-Rhône-Alpes.
