= Blue Banana =

High population and GDP corridor in Europe

The Blue Banana

The Blue Banana (Dutch: blauwe banaan; French: banane bleue; German: Blaue Banane; Italian: banana blu), also known as the European Megalopolis or the Liverpool–Milan Axis, is a discontinuous corridor of urbanization in Western and Central Europe, with a population of around 100 million. Over time, the region has been referred to by several names, each reflecting its development and significance. Initially, French geographer Roger Brunet, as the leader of RECLUS (Network for the study of changes in locations and spatial units), described the area as 'the European Backbone', which depicted an urban corridor extending from Liverpool to Milan.

Characterized by significant industrialization and urbanization, this area has attracted numerous public and private enterprises since the early post-war period, prompting researchers and academics to investigate the factors behind its remarkable development within Europe. It stretches approximately from North West England through the English Midlands across Greater London to the European Metropolis of Lille, the Benelux states with the Dutch Randstad and the Flemish Diamond and along the German Ruhrgebiet, Rhineland, Southern Germany, Alsace-Moselle in France in the west and Switzerland (Basel and Zürich), Austria (Vorarlberg and Tyrol) to Northern Italy (Milan, Turin, and Genoa) in the south. It is supported by Rhine–Alpine Corridor and (partially by) Scandinavian–Mediterranean Corridor of the Trans-European Transport Network.

== History ==
Population density in Europe in 2017, showing the highest density along the Blue Banana

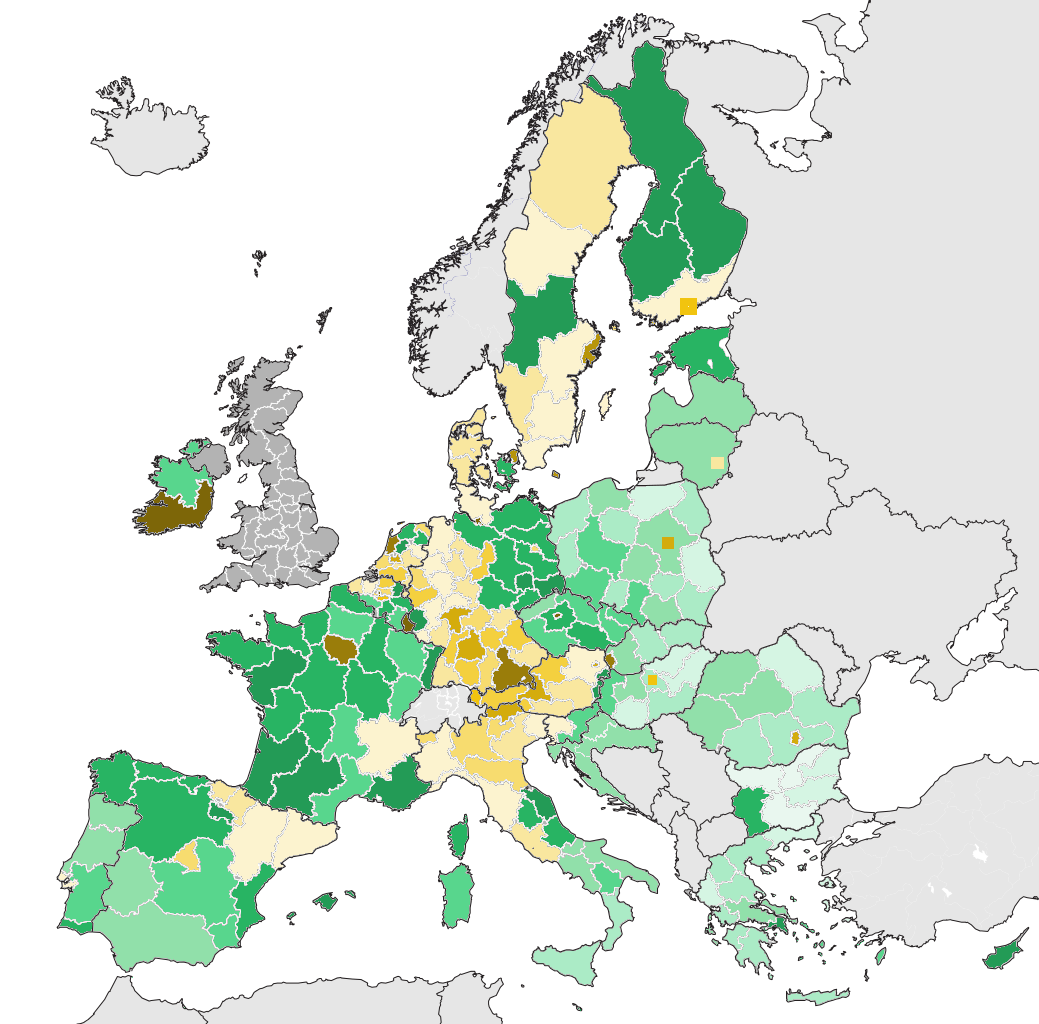
European Union regions by GDP in percentage of the EU average, showing the wealthiest regions are concentrated in the Blue Banana.Light green - 30%; dark green - 99 %; light yellow - 100%; dark yellow - 180% and above.

The French geographer Roger Brunet, who observed a division between "active" and "passive" spaces, developed the concept of a West European "backbone" in 1989. He made reference to an urban corridor of industry and services stretching from northern England to northern Italy. The name "Blue Banana" was dually coined by Jacques Chérèque, and an artist adding a graphic to an article by Josette Alia in Le Nouvel Observateur. The colour blue referred to either the flag of the European Community, or the blue collars of factory workers in the region.

Brunet saw the "European Backbone" as the development of historical precedents, e.g. trade routes, or as the consequence of an accumulation of industrial capital. In his analysis, Brunet excluded the Paris urban area and other French conurbations because of French economic insularity. His aim was a greater economic integration in Europe, but he felt that France had lost this connection by the 17th century as a result of its persecution of Huguenots and centralisation in Paris. Later versions do, however, include Paris.

In 1991, in the context of a study on behalf of the European Commission in support of its Regional Policy, researchers criticized the idea of the Blue Banana as a desirable formation, but not an empirical reality, identifying it as the result of regional competition in Europe. Furthermore, their diagram of the Blue Banana had more of a curve, still including Northern Italy, but ending at Barcelona. It also included Paris, and had the Anglo-Scottish border as its northern stem. A study of the history of the Blue Banana as a concept refers to the commission's study as a mistaken rejection of the Blue Banana from Brunet's original conception. From the research on the commission's behalf, the Blue Banana represented a developed core at the expense of the periphery, whereas Brunet empirically viewed the Blue Banana as a region of development at Paris's periphery, beyond the French borders. There are also considerations for an economically strong European pentagon with its borders Paris, London, Hamburg, Munich and Milan, with development axes towards the east (Berlin, Prague, Trieste).

== Shift of the Blue Banana ==
Blue, Golden, Green Bananas

In recent years, the Blue Banana has been shifting north towards Germany, as industrialization draws in new populations towards the Northern European countries. Rapid urbanization led to an increase in slums and poverty stricken areas, which pushed European countries to implement new policies regarding urban renewal. Since the United Kingdom's Action for Cities, France's Reconquête Urbaine and Germany's Städtebauförderung have been put in place, these urbanization policies have built a stronger foundation and better utilized urban spaces. These policies allow countries to expand further, economically, just as Germany has done. Other research by Capoani et al. (2023) examines the role of the UK and Northern Italy as peripheral regions within the Blue Banana, traditionally considered the economic core of Europe. The study compares these regions to central areas of the Blue Banana using indicators such as urbanisation, infrastructure, productivity, and competitiveness. While urbanisation and infrastructure metrics indicate continued integration into Europe's core, weaker economic performance in Northern Italy and the impacts of Brexit on the UK present significant challenges to the cohesion of the Blue Banana.

If current trends of urbanization continue, 72% of the world's population will live in cities by 2050. This creates a situation where European countries need to take steps to improve their ability to deal with the number of people that will move into the area. As a consequence of the rapid increase of urbanization and an influx of people to cities, the banana is growing instead of shifting.

Due to urbanization, the Blue Banana has become larger in size, branching outwards in a star shape. Despite this, the Blue Banana still remains the core of the conurbation. Although the Blue Banana may not have the same shape it had decades ago, Europe's largest concentration of people, industry, money, and economic power still lie within it.

== See also ==
- Belt and Road Initiative
- Demographics of Europe
- Four Motors for Europe
- Golden Banana
- French Empty diagonal
- List of metropolitan areas in the European Union by GDP
- Northeast megalopolis – a similar region in the United States
- Middle Francia
- History of Burgundy
- Kingdom of Burgundy
- Burgundian Circle
- Spanish Road
- Rotten Banana – an economically depressed region of Denmark
- Rhine–Alpine Corridor
- Scandinavian–Mediterranean Corridor
- Hajnal line

== Sources ==
- Geza, Tóth; Nagy, Zoltán; Kincses, Áron (2014). European Spatial Structure. Saarbrücken: Lambert Academic Publishing. doi:10.13140/2.1.1560.2247. ISBN 978-3-659-64559-4.
- Brunet, Roger (April 2002). "Lignes de force de l'espace Européen" (PDF). Mappemonde (in French). 66 (2): 14–19. doi:10.3406/mappe.2002.1759. S2CID 250514671.
- Capoani, L.; Lakócai, C.; Imbesi, C.; Van Veen, V. (2024). "Blue Banana dynamics and the perspective of its edges". European Spatial Research and Policy. 31 (2). doi:10.18778/1231-1952.31.2.02. hdl:11089/55062.
