= Golden Banana =

Higher population density area

The Golden Banana

The Golden Banana (Spanish: Plátano dorado, French: Banane dorée), also known as the Sun Belt, is an area of higher population density lying between Cartagena in the west and Genoa in the east along the coast of the Mediterranean Sea.

The area runs along the Mediterranean coast, including the French cities of Nice, Marseille, Montpellier, and Perpignan, and the Spanish cities of Figueres, Barcelona and Valencia. It was defined by the "Europe 2000" report from the European Commission in 1995 similarly to the Blue Banana.

== Description ==
Blue, Golden, Green Bananas

The region is characterized by its importance in activities related to information and communication technologies, in terms of quality of life and as a top travel destination. At any rate, the Golden Banana can also be understood as an extension of the Blue Banana over the Mediterranean arc.

The golden banana has development axes extending into the area of the upper Adriatic around Trieste. This also relates to the trade flows of the maritime Silk Road or the Chinese Belt and Road Initiative and its developments to Central Europe.

The golden banana overlaps the Mediterranean Corridor of Trans-European Transport Network (TEN-T).

== See also ==
- Blue Banana
- Rotten Banana
- Four Motors for Europe
- List of metropolitan areas in the European Union by GDP
