= List of German cities by GDP =

The following article sorts the 107 urban districts (Kreisfreie Städte – cities that constitute districts in their own right) and the metropolitan districts of Hanover, Aachen and Saarbrücken by their gross domestic product (GDP) in the year 2021. Most figures are from the Federal Statistical Office of Germany; figures from other sources are otherwise referenced. The GDP of German cities are shown in EUR€.

== List of cities ==
City	State	GDP (bil. €)	GDP per capita	GDP per worker
Berlin	Berlin	165.457	45,074	79,182
Hamburg	Hamburg	130.873	70,620	101,308
Munich	Bavaria	128.752	86,529	112,284
Frankfurt am Main	Hesse	74.087	97,270	100,966
Köln	North Rhine-Westphalia	66.687	61,845	84,983
Hannover region	Lower Saxony	55.374	47,884	80,313
Stuttgart	Baden-Württemberg	54.983	87,513	103,237
Düsseldorf	North Rhine-Westphalia	54.150	87,338	97,282
Nürnberg	Bavaria	32.323	62,997	81,571
Bremen	Bremen	30.973	54,826	83,433
Bonn	North Rhine-Westphalia	27.160	81,997	105,909
Essen	North Rhine-Westphalia	27.114	46,673	79,954
Dortmund	North Rhine-Westphalia	24.595	41,880	73,897
Dresden	Saxony	24.067	43,302	70,771
Leipzig	Saxony	23.804	39,695	67,660
Mainz	Rhineland-Palatinate	22.699	104,441	141,590
Aachen region	North Rhine-Westphalia	22.626	40,647	75,096
Karlsruhe	Baden-Württemberg	22.143	72,016	92,842
Mannheim	Baden-Württemberg	21.491	69,151	89,058
Braunschweig	Lower Saxony	20.504	82,448	122,031
Wolfsburg	Lower Saxony	19.668	158,749	153,485
Wiesbaden	Hesse	19.112	68,556	98,535
Münster	North Rhine-Westphalia	18.800	59,294	78,582
Duisburg	North Rhine-Westphalia	18.360	37,053	78,918
Ingolstadt	Bavaria	17.943	130,509	144,308
Saarbrücken region	Saarland	14.987	45,776	72,215
Bielefeld	North Rhine-Westphalia	14.773	44,263	67,893
Augsburg	Bavaria	14.740	49,771	75,289
Darmstadt	Hesse	14.107	88,497	101,492
Regensburg	Bavaria	13.842	90,529	86,595
Freiburg im Breisgau	Baden-Württemberg	13.712	59,259	75,884
Bochum	North Rhine-Westphalia	13.703	37,650	70,537
Wuppertal	North Rhine-Westphalia	13.502	38,056	77,414
Ludwigshafen am Rhein	Rhineland-Palatinate	13.130	76,182	104,488
Kiel	Schleswig-Holstein	12.452	50,531	70,750
Erlangen	Bavaria	11.814	104,698	104,473
Kassel	Hesse	11.017	54,884	72,133
Ulm	Baden-Württemberg	10.382	81,955	81,228
Lübeck	Schleswig-Holstein	10.231	47,354	76,904
Krefeld	North Rhine-Westphalia	9.803	43,194	78,982
Erfurt	Thuringia	9.483	44,425	66,005
Heidelberg	Baden-Württemberg	9.352	58,819	75,584
Mönchengladbach	North Rhine-Westphalia	9.312	35,770	67,151
Chemnitz	Saxony	9.311	38,199	63,840
Magdeburg	Saxony-Anhalt	8.985	38,074	64,845
Osnabrück	Lower Saxony	8.769	53,267	66,783
Gelsenkirchen	North Rhine-Westphalia	8.763	33,754	76,217
Koblenz	Rhineland-Palatinate	8.729	76,899	80,234
Würzburg	Bavaria	8.653	68,164	67,261
Oldenburg	Lower Saxony	8.558	50,342	71,497
Rostock	Mecklenburg-Vorpommern	8.486	40,656	70,381
Leverkusen	North Rhine-Westphalia	8.419	51,375	103,659
Potsdam	Brandenburg	8.288	45,378	70,536
Halle an der Saale	Saxony-Anhalt	8.149	34,244	64,737
Heilbronn	Baden-Württemberg	7.599	60,292	77,320
Hagen	North Rhine-Westphalia	6.730	35,665	69,761
Mülheim an der Ruhr	North Rhine-Westphalia	6.324	37,019	80,368
Oberhausen	North Rhine-Westphalia	5.908	28,246	64,243
Pforzheim	Baden-Württemberg	5.670	45,080	73,238
Aschaffenburg	Bavaria	5.594	78,658	91,547
Hamm	North Rhine-Westphalia	5.528	30,863	65,705
Solingen	North Rhine-Westphalia	5.448	34,246	74,469
Salzgitter	Lower Saxony	5.369	51,738	94,485
Jena	Thuringia	5.348	48,349	73,015
Schweinfurt	Bavaria	5.299	99,130	82,677
Bamberg	Bavaria	5.138	66,543	67,616
Offenbach am Main	Hesse	5.025	38,328	74,327
Fürth	Bavaria	5.012	38,951	78,836
Kaiserslautern	Rhineland-Palatinate	4.990	50,158	70,040
Trier	Rhineland-Palatinate	4.942	44,678	64,755
Bayreuth	Bavaria	4.795	64,820	72,295
Landshut	Bavaria	4.456	60,954	79,546
Herne	North Rhine-Westphalia	4.350	27,745	66,703
Remscheid	North Rhine-Westphalia	4.319	38,689	71,498
Schwerin	Mecklenburg-Vorpommern	4.224	44,150	64,208
Bremerhaven	Bremen	4.178	36,855	65,679
Coburg	Bavaria	4.031	98,551	98,188
Flensburg	Schleswig-Holstein	3.941	43,541	65,270
Neumünster	Schleswig-Holstein	3.856	48,380	70,620
Cottbus	Brandenburg	3.772	38,284	61,287
Passau	Bavaria	3.717	70,466	68,537
Kempten (Allgäu)	Bavaria	3.711	53,778	72,692
Rosenheim	Bavaria	3.486	54,850	69,983
Worms	Rhineland-Palatinate	3.465	41,419	77,303
Wilhelmshaven	Lower Saxony	3.419	45,522	74,376
Emden	Lower Saxony	3.323	66,872	83,174
Baden-Baden	Baden-Württemberg	3.061	55,158	73,826
Gera	Thuringia	2.946	32,115	60,822
Memmingen	Bavaria	2.883	64,737	74,945
Bottrop	North Rhine-Westphalia	2.882	24,562	62,506
Speyer	Rhineland-Palatinate	2.812	55,513	69,414
Amberg	Bavaria	2.695	64,142	73,043
Straubing	Bavaria	2.690	56,345	65,460
Ansbach	Bavaria	2.630	63,112	70,328
Dessau-Roßlau	Saxony-Anhalt	2.621	33,156	63,961
Weiden in der Oberpfalz	Bavaria	2.521	59,307	62,660
Brandenburg an der Havel	Brandenburg	2.507	34,695	64,392
Frankfurt an der Oder	Brandenburg	2.314	40,710	61,541
Weimar	Thuringia	2.203	33,837	63,978
Landau in der Pfalz	Rhineland-Palatinate	2.166	46,270	63,318
Hof (Saale)	Bavaria	2.087	46,228	61,214
Delmenhorst	Lower Saxony	1.963	25,320	61,135
Frankenthal (Pfalz)	Rhineland-Palatinate	1.885	38,661	74,954
Zweibrücken	Rhineland-Palatinate	1.791	52,606	79,991
Neustadt an der Weinstraße	Rhineland-Palatinate	1.754	32,851	63,965
Kaufbeuren	Bavaria	1.747	38,914	65,558
Eisenach	Thuringia	1.635	39,041	62,559
Pirmasens	Rhineland-Palatinate	1.582	39,428	60,570
Schwabach	Bavaria	1.580	38,430	70,398
Suhl	Thuringia	1.200	35,137	60,076

== List of metropolitan regions ==
Metropolitan regions in Germany

The 11 largest metropolitan regions in Germany by their gross domestic product in 2021.

Rank	Metropolitan Area	GDP (€ mio.) (2021)	Population (2022)	GDP per capita (€)
1	Rhine-Ruhr Metropolitan Region	536,431	13,000,000	41,264
2	Munich Metropolitan Region	361,310	6,300,000	57,349
3	Rhine-Main Metropolitan Region	300,868	5,900,000	50,144
4	Stuttgart Metropolitan Region	275,060	5,300,000	51,896
5	Hamburg Metropolitan Region	249,406	5,100,000	48,902
6	Berlin/Brandenburg Metropolitan Region	246,020	6,300,000	39,048
7	Hannover–Braunschweig–Göttingen–Wolfsburg Metropolitan Region	169,198	3,900,000	43,384
8	Nuremberg Metropolitan Region	156,517	3,500,000	44,719
9	Northwest Metropolitan Region	108,006	2,700,000	40,002
10	Rhine-Neckar Metropolitan Region	105,201	2,400,000	43,834
11	Central German Metropolitan Region	102,532	2,800,000	36,619

== See also ==
- Economy of Germany
- List of German states by GRDP
- List of German states by GRDP per capita
