= List of EU metropolitan regions by GDP =

Economic classification of the EU

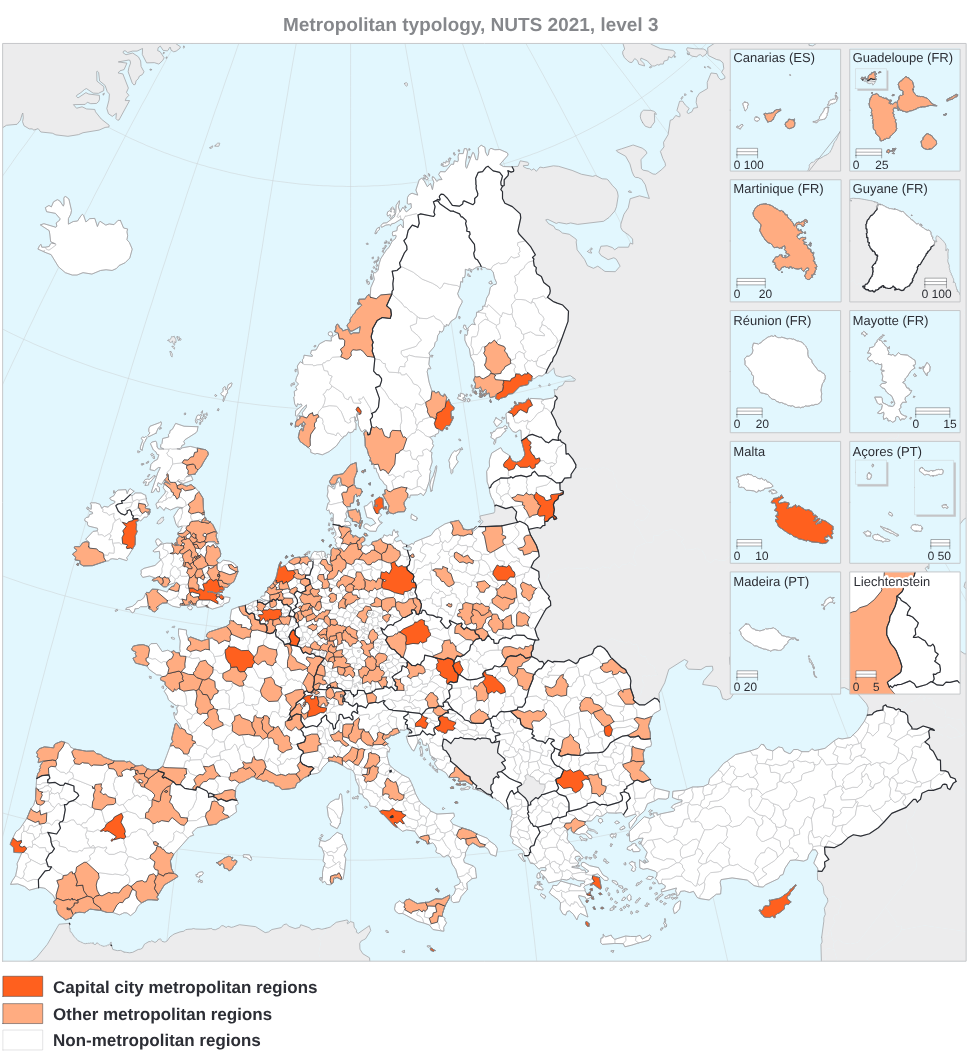
Map of metropolitan regions by Eurostat in 2021

A metropolitan region's gross domestic product, or GDP, is one of several measures of the size of its economy. Similar to GDP, GMP is defined as the market value of all final goods and services produced within a metropolitan region in a given period of time.

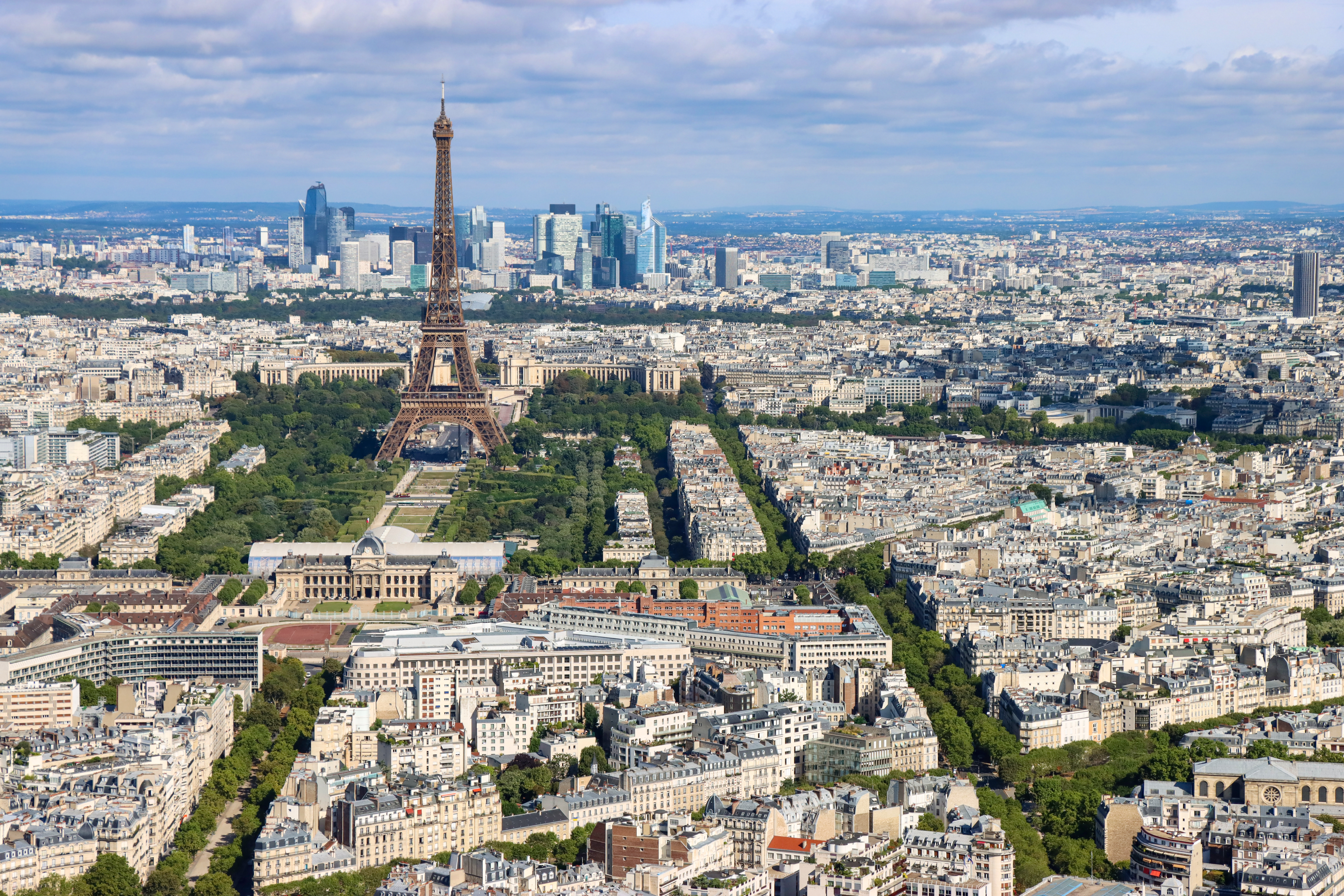
Paris metropolitan region has the largest GDP in the European Union (€758 billion).

== 2021 ranking of metropolitan regions in the European Union ==
This list shows metropolitan regions in the European Union by 2021 GDP according to Eurostat.

A NUTS 3 region (or a group thereof) is considered to be a metropolitan region, if at least 50% of its residents live inside a functional urban area with a population of 250,000 or more. NUTS 3 regions not meeting this criterion are considered to be non-metropolitan regions.

In some of the EU member states, there can exist differently defined areas of various sizes, which may also be called metropolitan regions. For example, the four distinct metropolitan regions of Munich, Augsburg, Ingolstadt, and Rosenheim, as defined by Eurostat, all lie within the area of the Munich Metropolitan Region.

| Rank | Metropolitan region | GDP (mil. €) | Country |
|---|---|---|---|
| 1 | Paris | 757,630 | France |
| 2 | Madrid | 295,939 | Spain |
| 3 | Dublin | 230,366 | Ireland |
| 4 | Milan | 228,436 | Italy |
| 5 | Berlin | 217,928 | Germany |
| 6 | Munich | 213,352 | Germany |
| 7 | Barcelona | 209,564 | Spain |
| 8 | Amsterdam | 201,100 | Netherlands |
| 9 | Brussels | 181,549 | Belgium |
| 10 | Ruhr | 180,467 | Germany |
| 11 | Hamburg | 179,525 | Germany |
| 12 | Stockholm | 171,269 | Sweden |
| 13 | Rome | 163,462 | Italy |
| 14 | Frankfurt | 160,841 | Germany |
| 15 | Stuttgart | 155,726 | Germany |
| 16 | Copenhagen | 155,575 | Denmark |
| 17 | Vienna | 140,330 | Austria |
| 18 | Marseille | 125,382 | France |
| 19 | Lisbon | 123,603 | Portugal |
| 20 | Cork | 115,681 | Ireland |
| 21 | Cologne | 102,257 | Germany |
| 22 | Warsaw | 99,748 | Poland |
| 23 | Helsinki | 98,663 | Finland |
| 24 | Lyon | 97,306 | France |
| 25 | Düsseldorf | 95,646 | Germany |
| 26 | Rotterdam | 95,187 | Netherlands |
| 27 | Prague | 93,517 | Czech Republic |
| 28 | Gothenburg | 88,582 | Sweden |
| 29 | Lille-Dunkerque-Valenciennes | 85,949 | France |
| 30 | Utrecht | 83,278 | Netherlands |
| 31 | Athens | 82,615 | Greece |
| 32 | Turin | 75,854 | Italy |
| 33 | Valencia | 75,522 | Spain |
| 34 | Budapest | 73,690 | Hungary |
| 35 | Luxembourg | 72,361 | Luxembourg |
| 36 | Nuremberg | 69,562 | Germany |
| 37 | Bucharest | 67,623 | Romania |
| 38 | Malmö | 62,349 | Sweden |
| 39 | Bordeaux | 61,279 | France |
| 40 | Naples | 61,059 | Italy |
| 41 | Hannover | 60,296 | Germany |
| 42 | Toulouse | 59,033 | France |
| 43 | Braunschweig-Salzgitter-Wolfsburg | 57,542 | Germany |
| 44 | Antwerpen | 56,876 | Belgium |
| 45 | Mannheim-Ludwigshafen | 56,100 | Germany |
| 46 | The Hague | 56,038 | Netherlands |
| 47 | Nantes | 54,834 | France |
| 48 | Bremen | 53,268 | Germany |
| 49 | Sevilla | 48,847 | Spain |
| 50 | Aarhus | 47,206 | Denmark |
| 51 | Alicante/Alacant-Elche/Elx | 46,473 | Spain |
| 52 | Eindhoven | 46,445 | Netherlands |
| 53 | Dresden | 46,369 | Germany |
| 54 | Brescia | 45,428 | Italy |
| 55 | Bonn | 45,317 | Germany |
| 56 | Zagreb | 45,096 | Croatia |
| 57 | Grenoble | 44,826 | France |
| 58 | Katowice | 44,570 | Poland |
| 59 | Bilbao | 44,230 | Spain |
| 60 | Bologna | 43,129 | Italy |
| 61 | Rouen | 43,070 | France |
| 62 | Strasbourg | 41,422 | France |
| 63 | Linz | 41,413 | Austria |
| 64 | Málaga-Marbella | 41,235 | Spain |
| 65 | Karlsruhe | 39,945 | Germany |
| 66 | Rennes | 39,899 | France |
| 67 | Murcia-Cartagena | 39,839 | Spain |
| 68 | Nice | 39,592 | France |
| 69 | Bergamo | 39,562 | Italy |
| 70 | Florence | 38,838 | Italy |
| 71 | Montpellier | 38,387 | France |
| 72 | Leipzig | 38,033 | Germany |
| 73 | Porto | 34,898 | Portugal |
| 74 | Zaragoza | 34,286 | Spain |
| 75 | Gent | 33,554 | Belgium |
| 76 | A Coruña | 33,478 | Spain |
| 77 | Padua | 33,461 | Italy |
| 78 | Palma de Mallorca | 33,319 | Spain |
| 79 | Sofia | 33,259 | Bulgaria |
| 80 | Ingolstadt | 32,626 | Germany |
| 81 | Verona | 32,499 | Italy |
| 82 | Breda | 32,245 | Netherlands |
| 83 | Arnhem-Nijmegen | 31,871 | Netherlands |
| 84 | Mainz | 31,672 | Germany |
| 85 | Heidelberg | 31,095 | Germany |
| 86 | Saarbrücken | 30,795 | Germany |
| 87 | Graz | 30,347 | Austria |
| 88 | Genoa | 29,039 | Italy |
| 89 | Heilbronn | 28,985 | Germany |
| 90 | Kraków | 28,742 | Poland |
| 91 | Bari | 28,702 | Italy |
| 92 | Poznań | 28,603 | Poland |
| 93 | Oviedo-Gijón | 28,350 | Spain |
| 94 | Freiburg im Breisgau | 28,149 | Germany |
| 95 | Las Palmas | 28,125 | Spain |
| 96 | Bratislava | 28,104 | Slovakia |
| 97 | Augsburg | 27,556 | Germany |
| 98 | Aalborg | 27,460 | Denmark |
| 99 | Brest | 27,233 | France |
| 100 | Cádiz | 26,784 | Spain |
| 101 | Venice | 26,470 | Italy |
| 102 | Liège | 26,413 | Belgium |
| 103 | Enschede | 26,173 | Netherlands |
| 104 | Münster | 26,053 | Germany |
| 105 | Brno | 25,938 | Czech Republic |
| 106 | Santa Cruz de Tenerife | 25,865 | Spain |
| 107 | Vigo | 25,663 | Spain |
| 108 | Annecy-Genève | 25,474 | France; Switzerland |
| 109 | Pamplona/Iruña | 24,975 | Spain |
| 110 | Angers | 24,955 | France |
| 111 | Lefkosia | 24,928 | Cyprus |
| 112 | Kiel | 24,523 | Germany |
| 113 | Palermo | 24,380 | Italy |
| 114 | Vilnius | 24,362 | Lithuania |
| 115 | Wiesbaden | 24,350 | Germany |
| 116 | Ulm | 24,044 | Germany |
| 117 | Gdańsk | 23,781 | Poland |
| 118 | Regensburg | 23,629 | Germany |
| 119 | Darmstadt | 23,554 | Germany |
| 120 | Orléans | 23,062 | France |
| 121 | Riga | 22,961 | Latvia |
| 122 | Mulhouse | 22,945 | France |
| 123 | Aachen | 22,907 | Germany |
| 124 | Clermont-Ferrand | 22,892 | France |
| 125 | Saint-Etienne | 22,655 | France |
| 126 | Groningen | 22,480 | Netherlands |
| 127 | Pau | 22,318 | France |
| 128 | Würzburg | 22,191 | Germany |
| 129 | Tampere | 22,104 | Finland |
| 130 | Salzburg | 22,093 | Austria |
| 131 | Odense | 21,745 | Denmark |
| 132 | Caen | 21,290 | France |
| 133 | Catania | 21,020 | Italy |
| 134 | Nancy | 20,841 | France |
| 135 | Granada | 20,837 | Spain |
| 136 | Tilburg | 20,814 | Netherlands |
| 137 | Ostrava | 20,781 | Czech Republic |
| 138 | Osnabrück | 20,721 | Germany |
| 139 | Reims | 20,385 | France |
| 140 | Reggio Emilia | 20,311 | Italy |
| 141 | Ljubljana | 20,256 | Slovenia |
| 142 | Turku | 20,009 | Finland |
| 143 | Nimes | 19,908 | France |
| 144 | Dijon | 19,648 | France |
| 145 | Tours | 19,586 | France |
| 146 | Uppsala | 19,080 | Sweden |
| 147 | Parma | 19,032 | Italy |
| 148 | Offenburg | 18,902 | Germany |
| 149 | Tallinn | 18,861 | Estonia |
| 150 | Erfurt | 18,745 | Germany |
| 151 | Łódź | 18,415 | Poland |
| 152 | Kassel | 18,084 | Germany |
| 153 | Perugia | 17,527 | Italy |
| 154 | Leiden | 17,520 | Netherlands |
| 155 | Zwolle | 17,295 | Netherlands |
| 156 | Córdoba | 17,217 | Spain |
| 157 | Magdeburg | 17,112 | Germany |
| 158 | Santander | 16,741 | Spain |
| 159 | Aschaffenburg | 16,613 | Germany |
| 160 | Wrocław | 16,579 | Poland |
| 161 | Oldenburg | 16,576 | Germany |
| 162 | Göttingen | 16,559 | Germany |
| 163 | Amiens | 16,460 | France |
| 164 | Valladolid | 16,425 | Spain |
| 165 | Lübeck | 16,156 | Germany |
| 166 | Thessaloniki | 16,003 | Greece |
| 167 | Besançon | 15,970 | France |
| 168 | Koblenz | 15,881 | Germany |
| 169 | Iserlohn | 15,775 | Germany |
| 170 | Le Mans | 15,595 | France |
| 171 | Halle (Saale) | 15,509 | Germany |
| 172 | Bocholt | 15,141 | Germany |
| 173 | Siegen | 14,936 | Germany |
| 174 | Bielefeld | 14,847 | Germany |
| 175 | Rostock | 14,788 | Germany |
| 176 | Innsbruck | 14,788 | Austria |
| 177 | Charleroi | 14,734 | Belgium |
| 178 | Valletta | 14,676 | Malta |
| 179 | Vitoria-Gasteiz | 14,091 | Spain |
| 180 | Wuppertal | 13,617 | Germany |
| 181 | Rosenheim | 13,073 | Germany |
| 182 | Poitiers | 12,849 | France |
| 183 | Cluj-Napoca | 12,471 | Romania |
| 184 | Reutlingen | 12,270 | Germany |
| 185 | Košice | 12,253 | Slovakia |
| 186 | Perpignan | 12,252 | France |
| 187 | Cagliari | 12,059 | Italy |
| 188 | Pforzheim | 12,031 | Germany |
| 189 | Bydgoszcz–Toruń (Bydgoszcz, Toruń) | 11,904 | Poland |
| 190 | Paderborn | 11,897 | Germany |
| 191 | Kaunas | 11,690 | Lithuania |
| 192 | Schweinfurt | 11,663 | Germany |
| 193 | Plzeň | 11,587 | Czech Republic |
| 194 | Messina | 11,585 | Italy |
| 195 | Taranto | 11,491 | Italy |
| 196 | Limoges | 11,268 | France |
| 197 | Leeuwarden | 11,255 | Netherlands |
| 198 | Timișoara | 11,147 | Romania |
| 199 | Konstanz | 11,111 | Germany |
| 200 | Giessen | 10,718 | Germany |
| 201 | Namur | 10,452 | Belgium |
| 202 | Zwickau | 10,231 | Germany |
| 203 | Bayreuth | 10,183 | Germany |
| 204 | Schwerin | 10,128 | Germany |
| 205 | Flensburg | 10,115 | Germany |
| 206 | Lublin | 9,765 | Poland |
| 207 | Les Abymes | 9,731 | France |
| 208 | Bielsko-Biała | 9,725 | Poland |
| 209 | Bremerhaven | 9,419 | Germany |
| 210 | Mönchengladbach | 9,340 | Germany |
| 211 | Constanța | 9,246 | Romania |
| 212 | Wetzlar | 9,086 | Germany |
| 213 | Fort-de-France | 8,988 | France |
| 214 | Ploiești | 8,842 | Romania |
| 215 | Kaiserslautern | 8,817 | Germany |
| 216 | Kielce | 8,775 | Poland |
| 217 | Düren | 8,482 | Germany |
| 218 | Opole | 8,475 | Poland |
| 219 | Iași | 8,394 | Romania |
| 220 | Coimbra | 8,369 | Portugal |
| 221 | Hildesheim | 8,362 | Germany |
| 222 | Rzeszów | 8,284 | Poland |
| 223 | Prato | 8,238 | Italy |
| 224 | Neubrandenburg | 7,936 | Germany |
| 225 | Brașov | 7,903 | Romania |
| 226 | Görlitz | 7,807 | Germany |
| 227 | Miskolc | 7,437 | Hungary |
| 228 | Szczecin | 7,173 | Poland |
| 229 | Olsztyn | 7,162 | Poland |
| 230 | Székesfehérvár | 7,011 | Hungary |
| 231 | Częstochowa | 6,706 | Poland |
| 232 | Maribor | 6,667 | Slovenia |
| 233 | Białystok | 6,452 | Poland |
| 234 | Radom | 6,330 | Poland |
| 235 | Craiova | 5,973 | Romania |
| 236 | Debrecen | 5,936 | Hungary |
| 237 | Plovdiv | 5,298 | Bulgaria |
| 238 | Split | 4,942 | Croatia |
| 239 | Galați | 4,340 | Romania |
| 240 | Tarnów | 4,310 | Poland |
| 241 | Varna | 4,309 | Bulgaria |
| 242 | Pécs | 3,934 | Hungary |
| 243 | Burgas | 3,309 | Bulgaria |

== 2021 ranking of top four German metropolitan regions ==
This list shows the top 4 metropolitan regions in Germany (German: Metropolregionen) by 2021 GDP according to German government figures. Those top four rank 2nd to 5th in Europe.

| Rank | Metropolitan region | GDP (mil. €) |
|---|---|---|
| 1 | Rhine-Ruhr Metropolitan Region | 536,431 |
| 2 | Munich Metropolitan Region | 361,310 |
| 3 | Frankfurt Rhine-Main Metropolitan Region | 300,868 |
| 4 | Stuttgart Metropolitan Region | 275,060 |

== See also ==
- Gross metropolitan product
- List of cities by GDP
- List of metropolitan areas in Europe
  - List of metropolitan areas (LUZ) in the European Union
  - List of urban areas in the European Union
- List of sovereign states in Europe by GDP (nominal)
- Nomenclature of Territorial Units for Statistics
