= List of German states by GRDP per capita =

The gross regional domestic product (GRDP) per capita of the German states is given in this article in nominal values, shown in euros. For easy comparison, all GRP figures are converted into United States dollars according to annual average exchange rates. (Note: Euro figures are converted to US dollars rates as of 31 December of a given year.) Values up until 2018 are rounded to the nearest hundred.

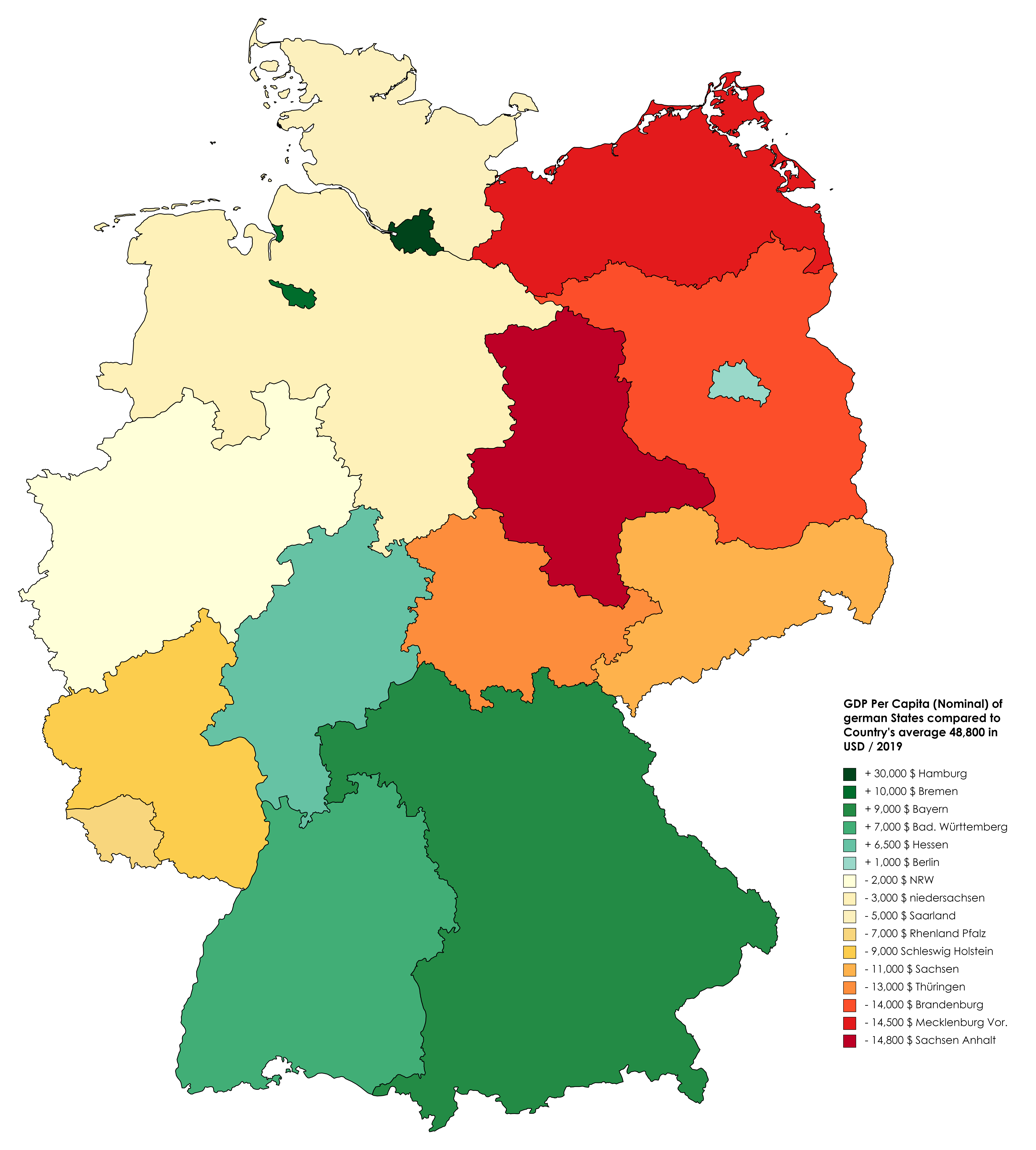
Nominal GDP per capita of German states compared to country's average 48,800 in US$ (2019)

== 2022 ==
List of German states by nominal GRP per capita in 2022
State	Rank	GRP per capita	
State	Rank	(EUR€)	(US$)
Germany	—	45,993	51,636.91
Hamburg	1	$76,910	€86,232.65
Bremen	2	$56,901	€63,798.25
Bavaria	3	$53,768	€60,285.49
Baden-Württemberg	4	$50,982	€57,161.78
Hesse	5	$50,751	€56,902.78
Berlin	6	$48,147	€53,983.14
North Rhine-Westphalia	7	$43,910	€49,232.55
Schleswig-Holstein	8	$41,925	€47,006.94
Lower Saxony	9	$41,826	€46,895.94
Rhineland-Palatinate	10	$41,366	€46,380.18
Saarland	11	$38,994	€43,720.66
Saxony	12	$35,909	€40,261.71
Brandenburg	13	$34,610	€38,805.25
Saxony-Anhalt	14	$34,505	€38,687.52
Thuringia	15	$33,656	€37,735.61
Mecklenburg-Vorpommern	16	$32,837	€36,817.34

== 2019 ==
List of German states by nominal GRP per capita in 2019
State	Rank	GRP per capita	
State	Rank	(EUR€)	(US$)
Germany	—	41,358	48,794
Hamburg	1	$66,879	€78,904
Bremen	2	$49,215	€58,064
Bavaria	3	$48,323	€57,012
Baden-Württemberg	4	$47,290	€55,793
Hesse	5	$46,923	€55,360
Berlin	6	$41,967	€49,513
North Rhine-Westphalia	7	$39,678	€46,812
Lower Saxony	8	$38,423	€45,332
Saarland	9	$36,684	€43,280
Rhineland-Palatinate	10	$35,457	€41,832
Schleswig-Holstein	11	$33,712	€39,773
Saxony	12	$31,453	€37,108
Thuringia	13	$29,883	€35,256
Brandenburg	14	$29,541	€34,853
Mecklenburg-Vorpommern	15	$28,940	€34,143
Saxony-Anhalt	16	$28,800	€33,978

== 2018 ==
List of German states by nominal GRP per capita in 2018
State	Rank	GRP per capita (EUR€)	GRP per capita (US$)
Germany	—	40,900	48,200
Hamburg	1	$65,600	€77,400
Bremen	2	$50,400	€59,500
Bavaria	3	$47,900	€56,600
Hesse	4	$46,700	€55,100
Baden-Württemberg	5	$46,300	€54,600
Berlin	6	$40,600	€47,900
North Rhine-Westphalia	7	$39,400	€46,400
Lower Saxony	8	$37,100	€43,800
Rhineland-Palatinate	9	$36,600	€43,200
Saarland	10	$36,200	€42,800
Schleswig-Holstein	11	$33,600	€39,600
Saxony	12	$31,000	€36,600
Thuringia	13	$29,700	€35,100
Brandenburg	14	$29,400	€34,700
Saxony-Anhalt	15	$28,700	€33,800
Mecklenburg-Vorpommern	16	$27,900	€33,000

== 2017 ==
List of German states by nominal GRP per capita in 2017
State	Rank	GRP per capita (EUR€)	GRP per capita (US$)
Germany	—	39,500	47,600
Hamburg	1	$64,600	€73,100
Bremen	2	$49,600	€56,000
Bavaria	3	$45,800	€51,800
Baden-Württemberg	4	$44,900	€50,700
Hesse	5	$44,800	€50,600
North Rhine-Westphalia	6	$38,600	€43,700
Berlin	7	$38,000	€43,000
Lower Saxony	8	$36,200	€40,900
Saarland	9	$35,500	€40,100
Rhineland-Palatinate	10	$35,500	€40,100
Schleswig-Holstein	11	$32,300	€36,500
Saxony	12	$29,900	€33,700
Thuringia	13	$28,800	€32,600
Brandenburg	14	$27,700	€31,300
Saxony-Anhalt	15	$27,200	€30,700
Mecklenburg-Vorpommern	16	$26,600	€30,000

== 2016 ==
List of German states by nominal GRP per capita in 2016
State	Rank	GRP per capita (EUR€)	GRP per capita (US$)
Germany	—	38,200	42,300
Hamburg	1	$61,800	€68,400
Bremen	2	$47,900	€53,000
Bavaria	3	$44,200	€48,900
Hesse	4	$43,800	€48,500
Baden-Württemberg	4	$43,800	€48,500
North Rhine-Westphalia	6	$37,600	€41,600
Berlin	7	$36,600	€40,500
Saarland	8	$35,300	€39,100
Rhineland-Palatinate	9	$34,500	€38,200
Lower Saxony	10	$33,300	€36,800
Schleswig-Holstein	11	$31,100	€34,400
Saxony	12	$29,200	€32,300
Thuringia	13	$28,300	€31,300
Brandenburg	14	$27,600	€30,500
Saxony-Anhalt	15	$26,600	€29,400
Mecklenburg-Vorpommern	16	$25,800	€28,500

== See also ==
- List of German states by GRDP
- List of German cities by GDP
