= Hanover–Braunschweig–Göttingen–Wolfsburg Metropolitan Region =

Metropolitan region in Lower Saxony, Germany

Hanover-Braunschweig-Göttingen-Wolfsburg Metropolitan Region Metropolregion Hannover-Braunschweig-Göttingen-Wolfsburg
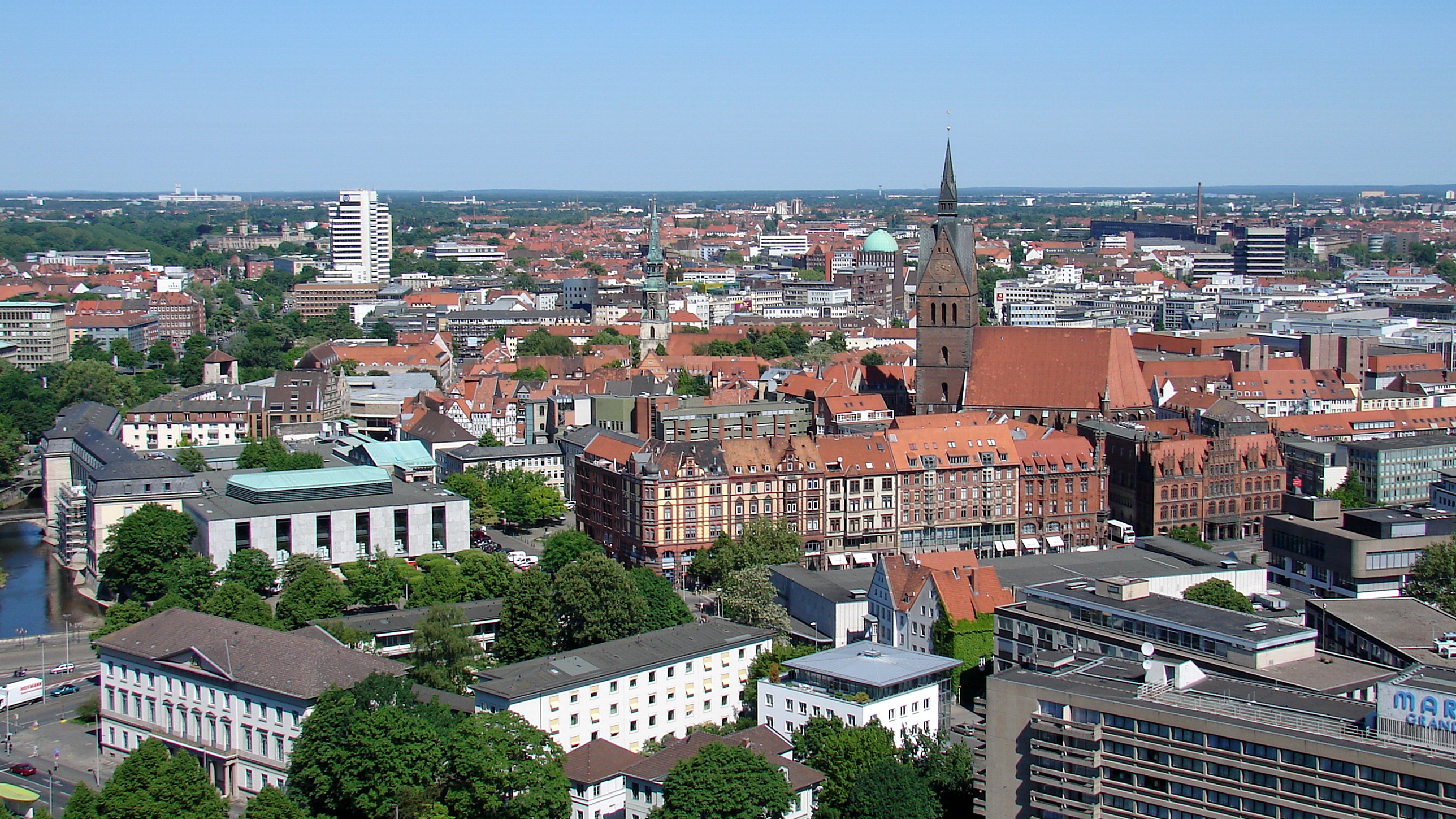
- Hanover

- Logo

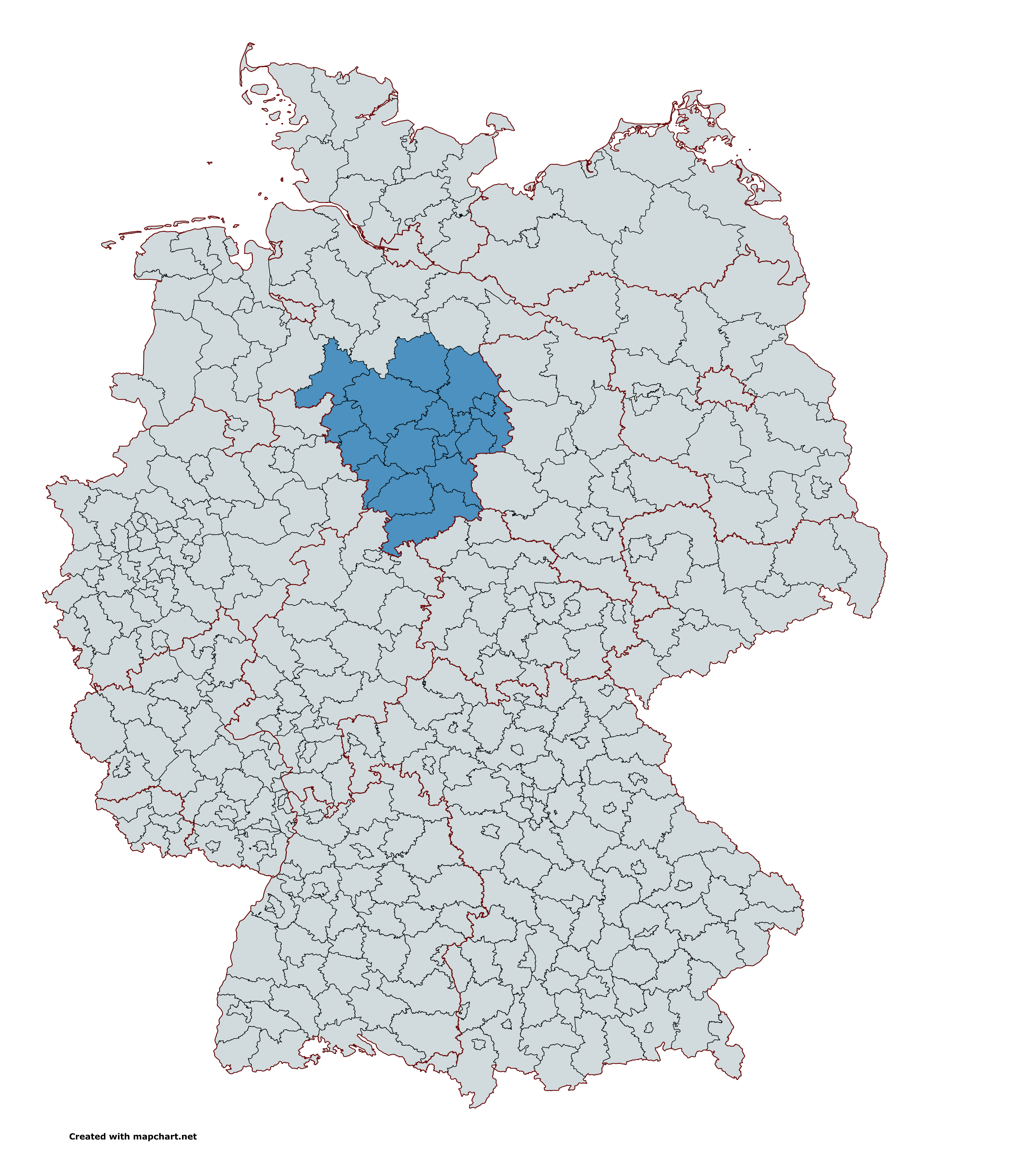
- Location Hanover–Braunschweig–Göttingen–Wolfsburg Metropolitan Region in Germany
- Country: Germany
- State: Lower Saxony
- Largest Cities: Hanover; Braunschweig; Göttingen; Hildesheim; Wolfsburg; Salzgitter

Government
  - Type: GmbH
  - Chief executive: Stephan Weil (SPD), Mayor of Hanover

Area
  - Metro: 18,600 km^{2} (7,200 sq mi)

Population (2015)
  - Metro: 3,845,271
  - Metro density: 210/km^{2} (540/sq mi)

GDP
  - Metro: €169.198 billion (2021)
- Time zone: UTC+1 (CET)
- Website: http://www.metropolregion-hbg.de/

The Hanover–Braunschweig–Göttingen–Wolfsburg Metropolitan Region (German: Metropolregion Hannover-Braunschweig-Göttingen-Wolfsburg) is an economic and cultural region in the Lower Saxony state of Northern Germany. The metropolitan region comprises approximately one third of the area of Lower Saxony, with almost half the inhabitants of the state. It has about 3.9 million people in 20 districts and counties with a total of 431 municipalities and is defined by the German Ministerkonferenz für Raumordnung (MKRO) as a medium urban area in Germany.

== History ==
The application for recognition as a European metropolitan region with the German Ministerkonferenz für Raumordnung responsible for regional planning (MKRO) was made early. The recognition should help the region internationally and improve coordination and development of cities. Although the importance of the region and the developments relating to the citynetwork Expo 2000 she was still the smallest of the metropolitan regions. In 2005 a loose co-operation was initiated with the nearby city regions of Braunschweig and Salzgitter and up in the area of Göttingen.

== Area description ==
Between the cities of the region there are large predominantly agricultural areas. The urban infrastructure network consist of the highways A2, A7 and A39 and fast rail links, in particular some high speed rail (like the Hanover–Würzburg high-speed railway).

The region is mainly based on the service sector and manufacturing. The largest group is the Volkswagen AG headquarters in Wolfsburg. The science and research landscape of the region includes seven universities (including the University of Göttingen, Leibniz University Hannover and the Braunschweig University of Technology), nine colleges, an art college, a music and theater school, and approximately 60 other research institutions (including a large number of Max Planck Society Institutes, two locations of the German Aerospace Center (DLR) in Braunschweig and Göttingen, the Herzog August Bibliothek in Wolfenbüttel and various federal agencies such as BBA, BGR, FAL, PTB).

Radioactive waste is frequently transported in the area to the city of Salzgitter, for the deep geological repository Schacht Konrad and between Schacht Asse II in the Wolfenbüttel district and Lindwedel and Höfer.

=== Urban agglomerations ===
Urban agglomerations	Major cities/towns	Population	Area
Hanover urban agglomeration		1,145,000	1,133 km^{2}
	Hanover	538,387	204 km^{2}
	Langenhagen	52,340	72 km^{2}
	Garbsen	63,081	79.3 km^{2}
Braunschweig urban agglomeration		551,235	193.7 km^{2} (excluding green space)
	Braunschweig city	272,417	66.1 km^{2}
	Salzgitter Nord / Nordost/ Lebenstedt	76,522	22.2 km^{2}
	Wolfenbüttel (Town)	53,133	14.5 km^{2}
Göttingen urban agglomeration		263,611	1,117 km^{2}
	Göttingen	126,312	122 km^{2}
Wolfsburg urban agglomeration		217,433	775 km^{2}
	Wolfsburg	133,692	204 km^{2}
	Gifhorn	42,006	105.4 km^{2}
Hildesheim urban agglomeration		285,024	1,380.4 km^{2}
	Hildesheim	106,587	93 km^{2}
	Salzgitter-Südost	29,599	175.4 km^{2}
Hanover-Braunschweig-Göttingen-Wolfsburg		3,907,122	18,623 km^{2}

The most populated urban agglomerations within the metropolitan region are Hanover, Braunschweig, Hildesheim, Göttingen and Wolfsburg. Hanover is the largest one from all in terms of population.

Hanover is the capital of the state and consists of multiple towns such as Langenhagen, Stadthagen or Garbsen that make up the urban agglomeration. Hanover is the most populated city and agglomeration in the Metropolitan area. Hanover is a metropolis but due its higher dependency for its surroundings leads to a lower amount of centralization, having only slightly higher amount of resources and businesses compared to other cities in the Metropolitan area.

Braunschweig is the densest and most diverse urban agglomeration in the whole state with about 45% of the urban agglomeration having a foreign background. Braunschweig is the largest regiopolis in the area and is after Hanover the second metropolitan city in the region with a population of 272,417. The agglomeration is the second largest in the metropolitan area. Togethor with Hanover, Braunschweig is one of the two major centers in the region.

Hildesheim is the largest urban agglomeration in terms of land space and is situated below the Hanover region. It consists of Salzgitter Bad, Baddeckenstedt, as well as the city Hildesheim.

Salzgitter is part of the urban agglomerations Braunschweig and Hildesheim. 73.1% of the residents in Salzgitter live within the Braunschweig urban agglomeration but most of the land is in Hildesheim's agglomeration. Due to Salzgitter being spread out, it is not an urban agglomeration itself but rather a connection between two agglomerations and part of both. Factories and industries were placed mostly on the emptier side of the city in order to avoid any risks towards urban settlements.

Göttingen is the most isolated urban agglomeration from all and the most sparsely populated urban area in the metropolitan region. Majority of the people in this agglomeration are students and tend to live in the area because of its close proximity to Kassel, a city known for slightly higher living costs than Göttingen.

Wolfsburg, headquarters of Volkswagen, is situated close to Braunschweig and the town Gifhorn, which is also part of Wolfsburg's urban agglomeration. The population of Wolfsburg's urban agglomeration is concentrated within the city area but has some parts in the nearby districts Gifhorn and Helmstedt.

The metropolitan region is divided into four main sectors: Braunschweig, Hildesheim, Hanover and Göttingen. Most of the population is within the Hanover region (1.20 million) and Braunschweig region (1.66 million).

Percentage of Migrants in Selected German Cities
City	Percentage of Migrants	Year	Count of people
Salzgitter	57.5%	2023	61,998
Wolfsburg	44.0%	2024	58,811
Hanover	42.4%	2023	228,276
Braunschweig	37.5%	2024	102,156
Göttingen	35.4%	2023	44,714
Hildesheim	29.4%	2024	31,336

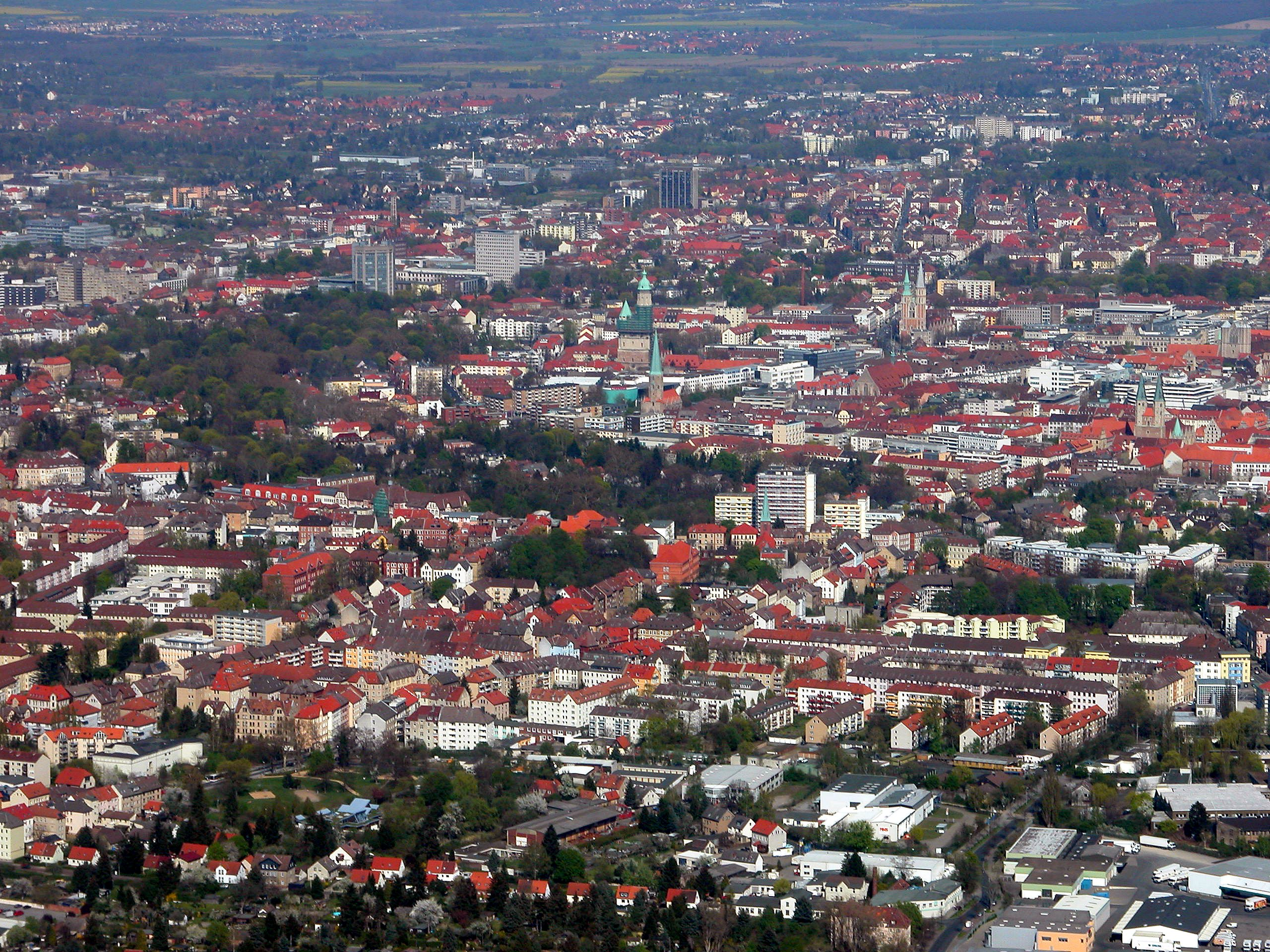
Braunschweig city center in 2007

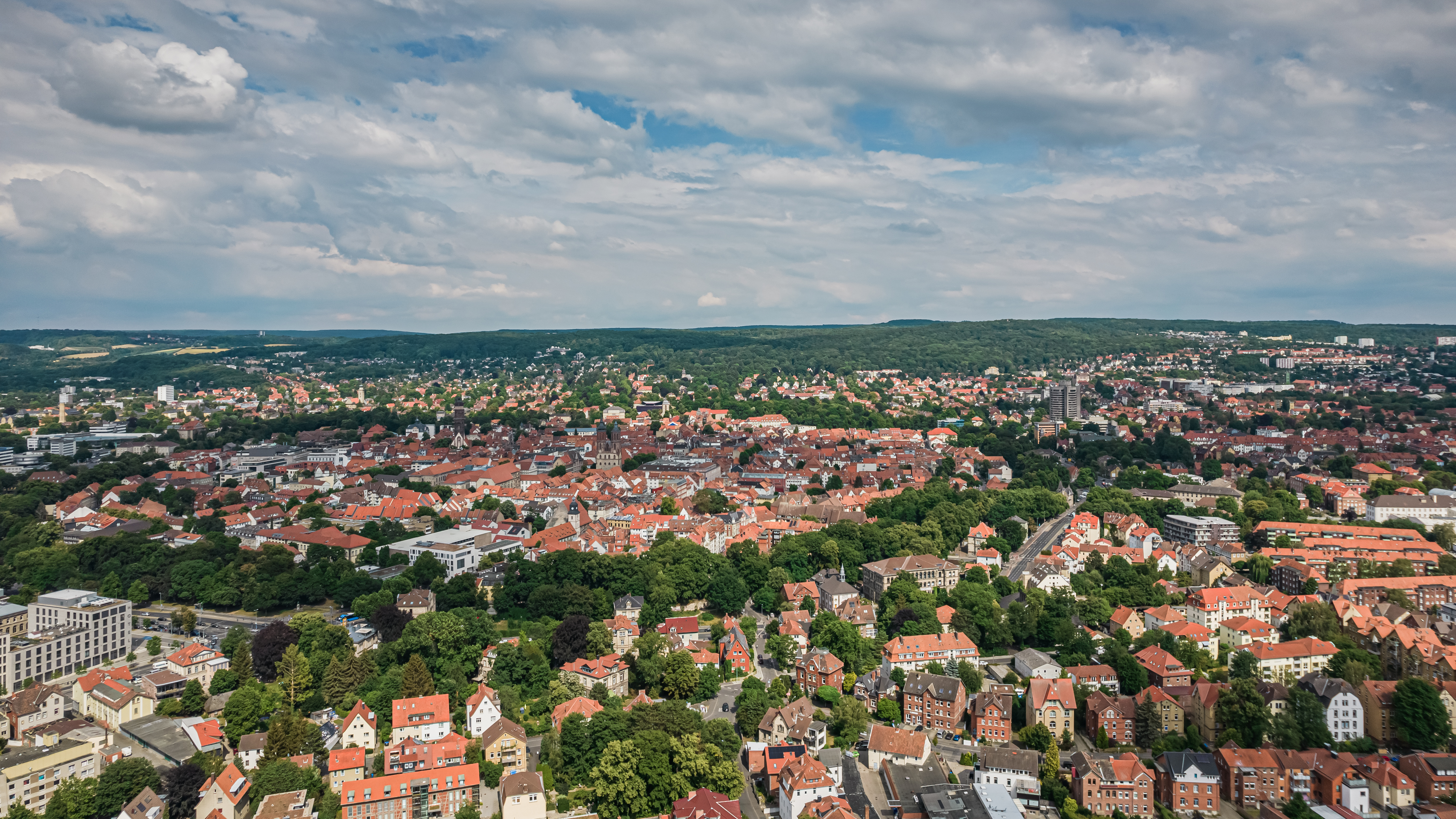
Göttingen

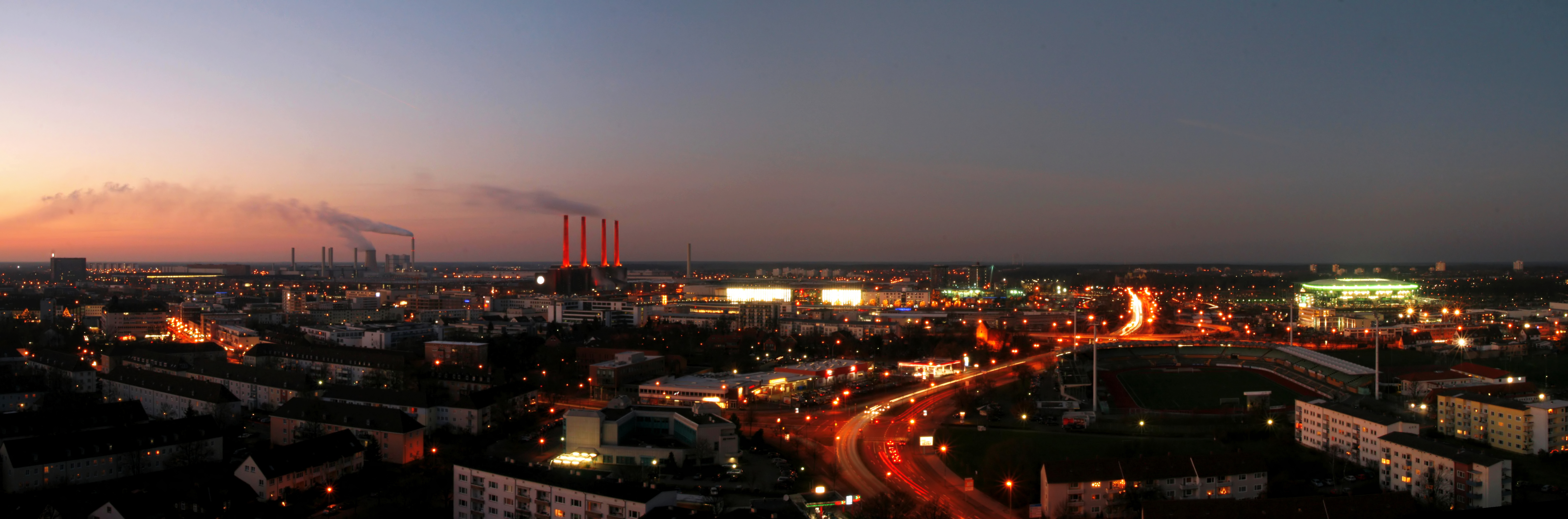
Wolfsburg city skyline

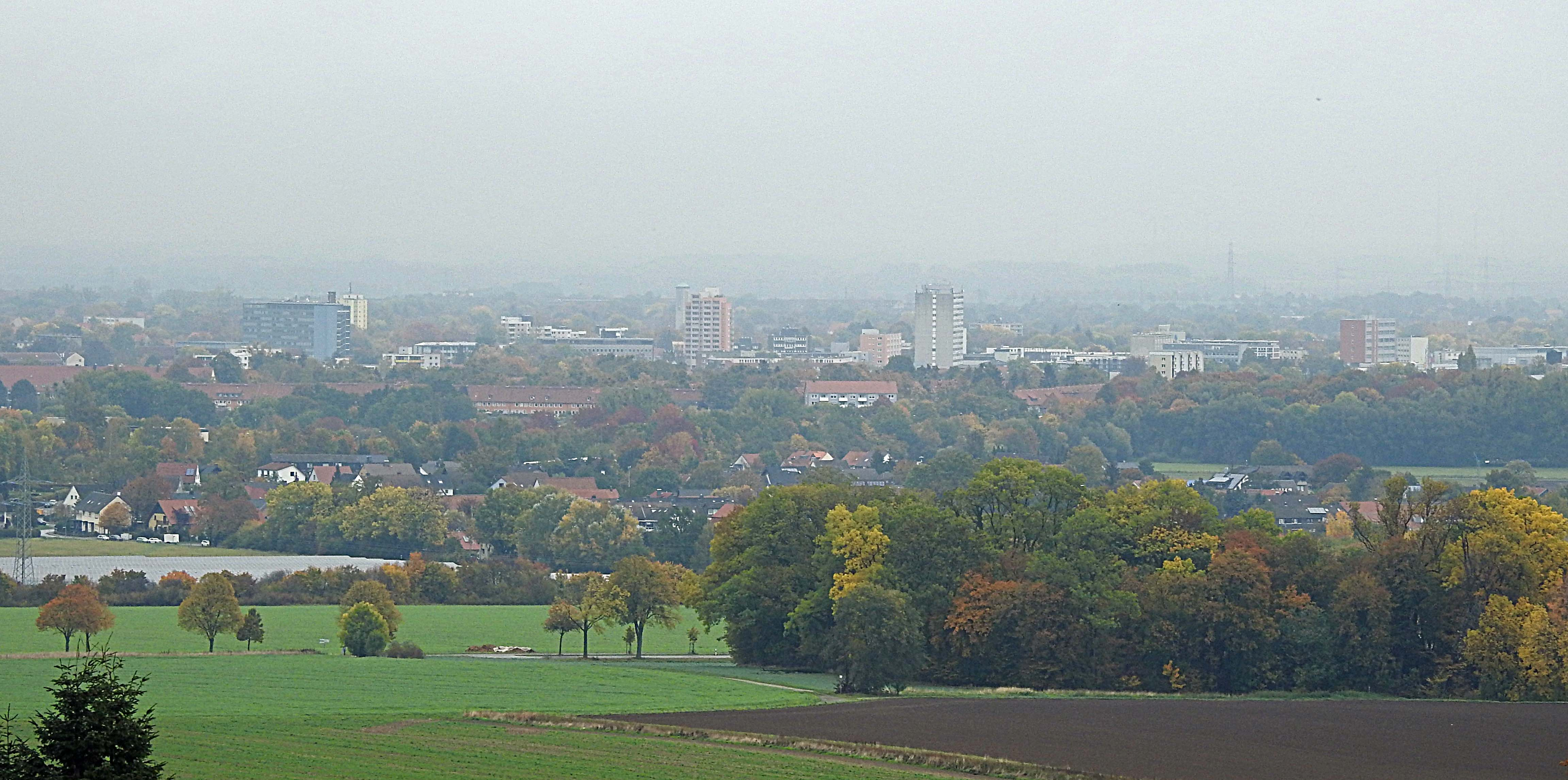
Salzgitter-Lebenstedt central area

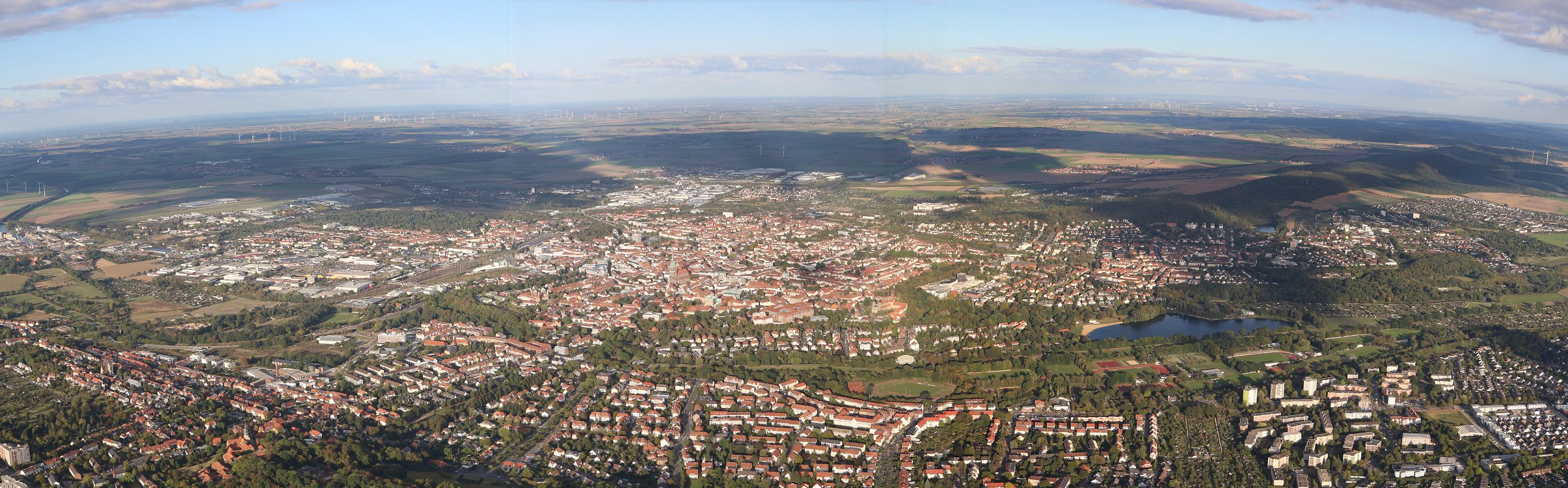
Hildesheim

== Members ==
Germany-Metropolitan region 5

Members of the Metropolitan Region Hanover–Brunswick–Göttingen–Wolfsburg are:

- Celle (district)
- Gifhorn (district)
- Göttingen (district)
- Goslar (district)
- Hamelin-Pyrmont (district)
- Hildesheim (district)
- Holzminden (district)
- Nienburg (district)
- Northeim (district)
- Osterode (district)
- Peine (district)
- Schaumburg (district)
- Soltau-Fallingbostel (district)
- City Alfeld
- City Bad Pyrmont
- City Braunschweig
- City Celle
- City Einbeck
- City Garbsen
- City Göttingen
- City Hann. Münden
- Landeshauptstadt Hanover
- City Hildesheim
- City Holzminden
- City Laatzen
- City Langenhagen
- City Lehrte
- Municipality Lengede
- City Nienburg/Weser
- City Northeim
- Oberharz (Samtgemeinde)
- City Osterode am Harz
- City Pattensen
- City Peine
- City Salzgitter
- City Sarstedt
- City Seesen
- City Stadthagen
- City Walsrode
- City Wolfenbüttel
- City Wolfsburg
- Hanover (district)
- Zweckverband Großraum Braunschweig
- Expo-Region, Hameln

== See also ==
- Metropolitan regions in Germany
