= List of statistical offices in Germany =

The statistical offices of the German states (German: Statistische Landesämter) carry out the task of collecting official statistics in Germany together and in cooperation with the Federal Statistical Office.

The implementation of statistics according to Article 83 of the constitution is executed at state level. The federal government has, under Article 73 (1) 11. of the constitution, the exclusive legislation for the "statistics for federal purposes."

There are 14 statistical offices for the 16 states:

State (Bundesland)	Institution (Landesamt)	Headquarters	Website
Baden-Württemberg	Statistisches Landesamt Baden-Württemberg	Stuttgart	
Bavaria	Bayerisches Landesamt für Statistik	Fürth and Schweinfurt	
Berlin and Brandenburg	Amt für Statistik Berlin-Brandenburg	Potsdam, Berlin and Cottbus	
Bremen	Statistisches Landesamt Bremen	Bremen	
Hamburg and Schleswig-Holstein	Statistisches Amt für Hamburg und Schleswig-Holstein	Hamburg and Kiel	
Hesse	Hessisches Statistisches Landesamt	Wiesbaden	
Lower Saxony	Landesamt für Statistik Niedersachsen	Hanover	
Mecklenburg-Vorpommern	Statistisches Amt Mecklenburg-Vorpommern	Schwerin	
North Rhine-Westphalia	IT.NRW – Statistisches Landesamt Nordrhein-Westfalen	Düsseldorf	
Rhineland-Palatinate	Statistisches Landesamt Rheinland-Pfalz	Bad Ems	
Saarland	Statistisches Amt des Saarlandes	Saarbrücken	
Saxony	Statistisches Landesamt des Freistaates Sachsen	Kamenz	
Saxony-Anhalt	Statistisches Landesamt Sachsen-Anhalt	Halle	
Thuringia	Thüringer Landesamt für Statistik	Erfurt	

== See also ==
- Federal Statistical Office of Germany
