= Stuttgart Metropolitan Region =

Coordinates: 48°46′N 9°10′E

Stuttgart Metropolitan Region Metropolregion Stuttgart
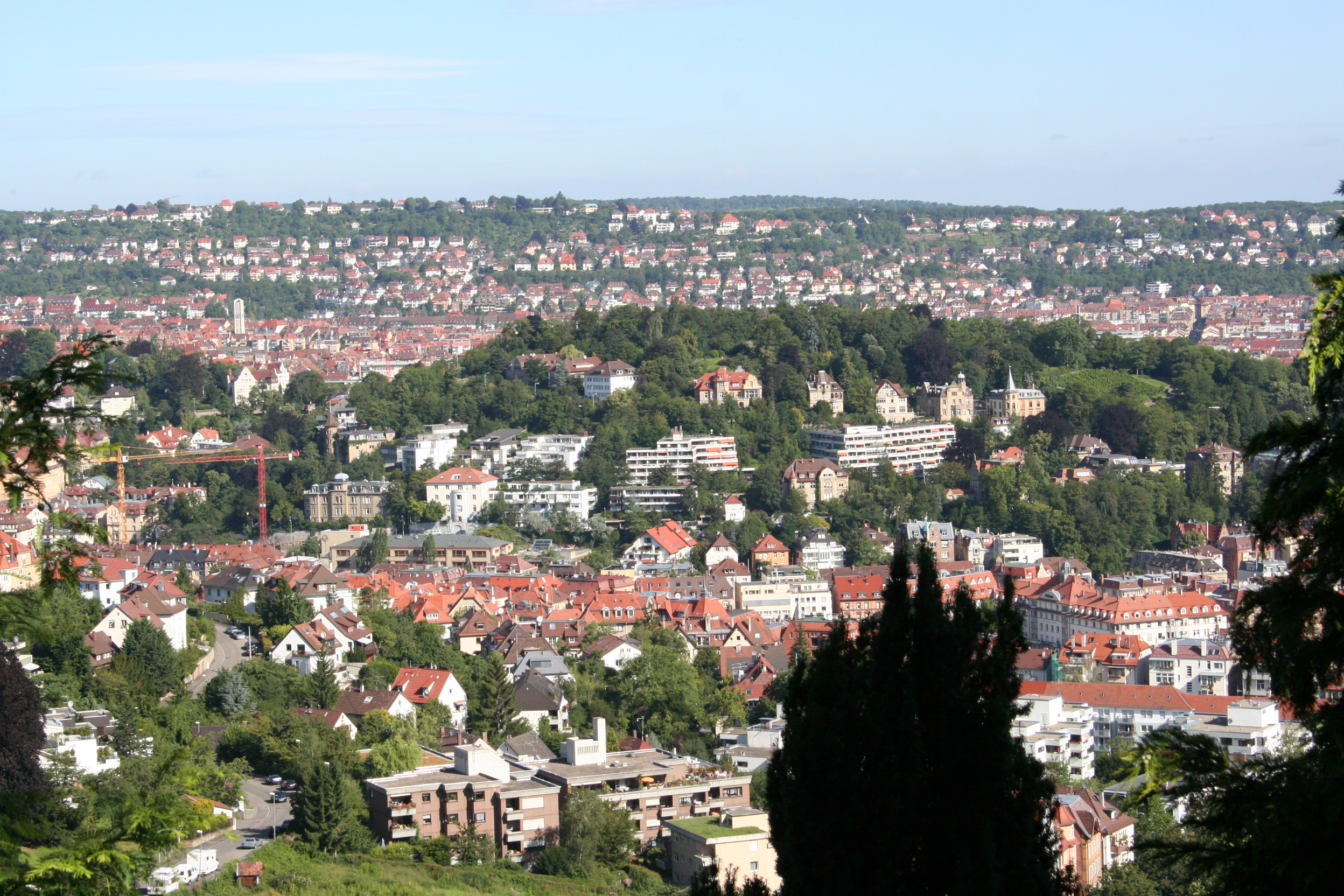
- Stuttgart

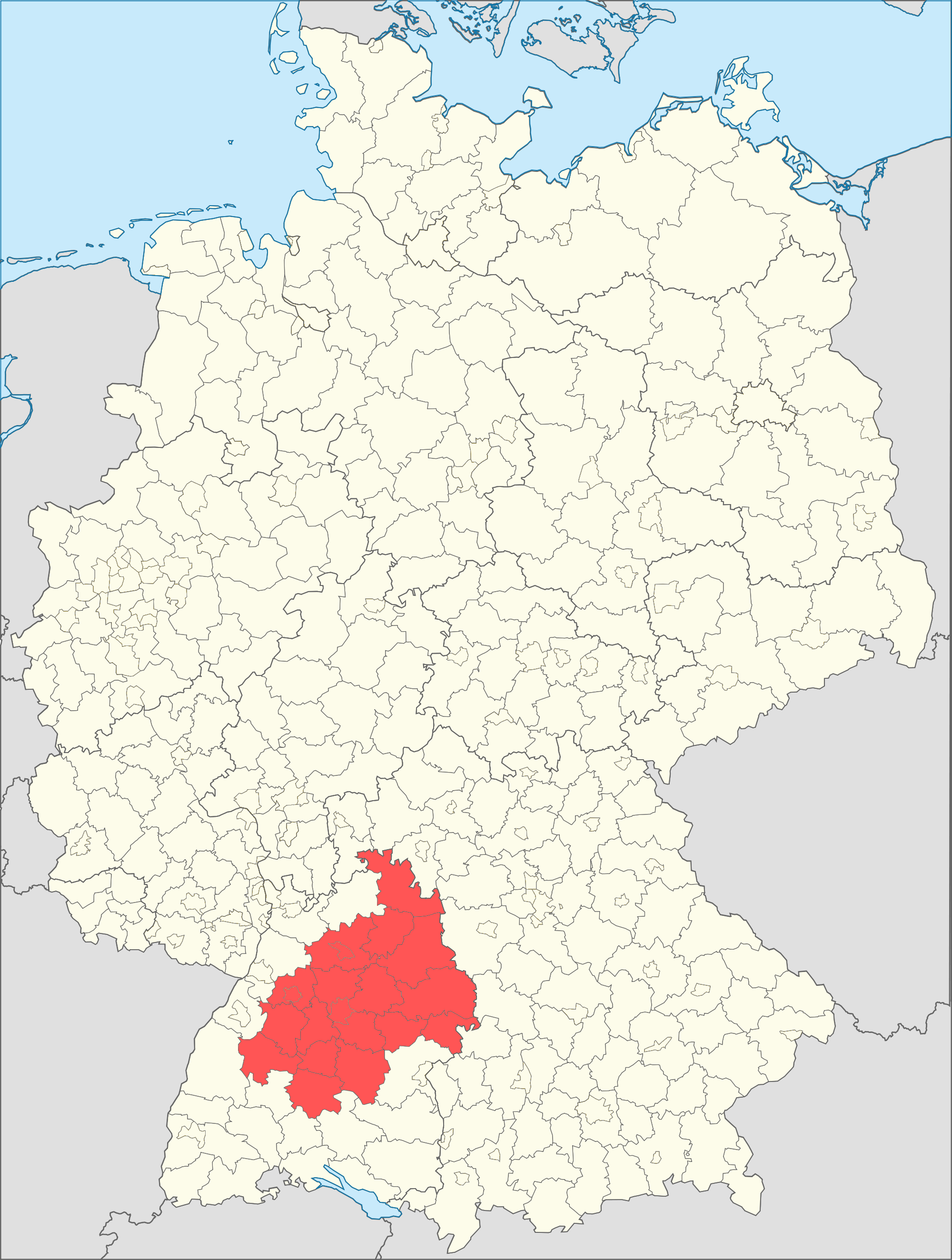
- Location of the Stuttgart Metropolitan Region in Germany
- Country: Germany
- State: Baden-Württemberg
- Largest Cities: Stuttgart; Heilbronn; Reutlingen; Ludwigsburg; Esslingen am Neckar; Tübingen

Government
  - Type: Verband Region Stuttgart

Area
  - Metro: 15,400 km^{2} (5,900 sq mi)

Population (2021)
  - Metro: 5,465,093
  - Metro density: 343/km^{2} (890/sq mi)

GDP
  - Metro: €275.060 billion (2021)
- Time zone: UTC+1 (CET)
- Website: http://www.region-stuttgart.org/metropolregion/

The Stuttgart Metropolitan Region is a metropolitan region in south-west Germany consisting of the cities and regions around Stuttgart, Heilbronn, Tübingen/Reutlingen. These cities are arranged into three agglomeration areas. The population of the area is about 5,300,000 and it is one of the biggest regions in Germany. This area covers an area of ca 15,000 km^{2}.

The Stuttgart metropolitan region is roughly 200 km south of Frankfurt, 200 km west of Munich and about 600 km east of Paris. Other metropolitan areas around are Rhine-Neckar, Frankfurt Rhine-Main, Nuremberg Metropolitan and Munich Metropolitan.

The region is among Germany’s economically significant regions and is home to the global headquarters of several major companies, including Mercedes-Benz, Porsche, Bosch, Mahle, Lidl, Kaufland, Würth, Märklin, Stihl, Kärcher, Trumpf and Festo The region also includes numerous small and medium-sized enterprises, including firms described as hidden champions, which form part of Germany’s German Mittelstand. IBM, Hewlett-Packard, Intersport, Euronics and FrieslandCampina also maintain their German headquarters in the region.

Culturally the region is mostly Swabian, with some Franconian parts in the north. The region has a strong wine and beer tradition with many wine and beer festivals round the year. Most notably are the Cannstatter Volksfest (an Oktoberfest-like celebration that occurs twice a year), the Stuttgart wine festival and the Heilbronn wine festival. Typical dishes of the region are Maultaschen, Spätzle (e.g. as Linsen mit Spätzle), Flädle soup, Schupfnudeln and Zwiebelrostbraten.

== Maps ==
Location of the Stuttgart Metropolitan Region (orange) in Baden-Württemberg

== See also ==
- Stuttgart Region
