= Federal Statistical Office of Germany =

Federal authority in Germany

Federal Statistical Office
- Statistisches Bundesamt (Destatis)

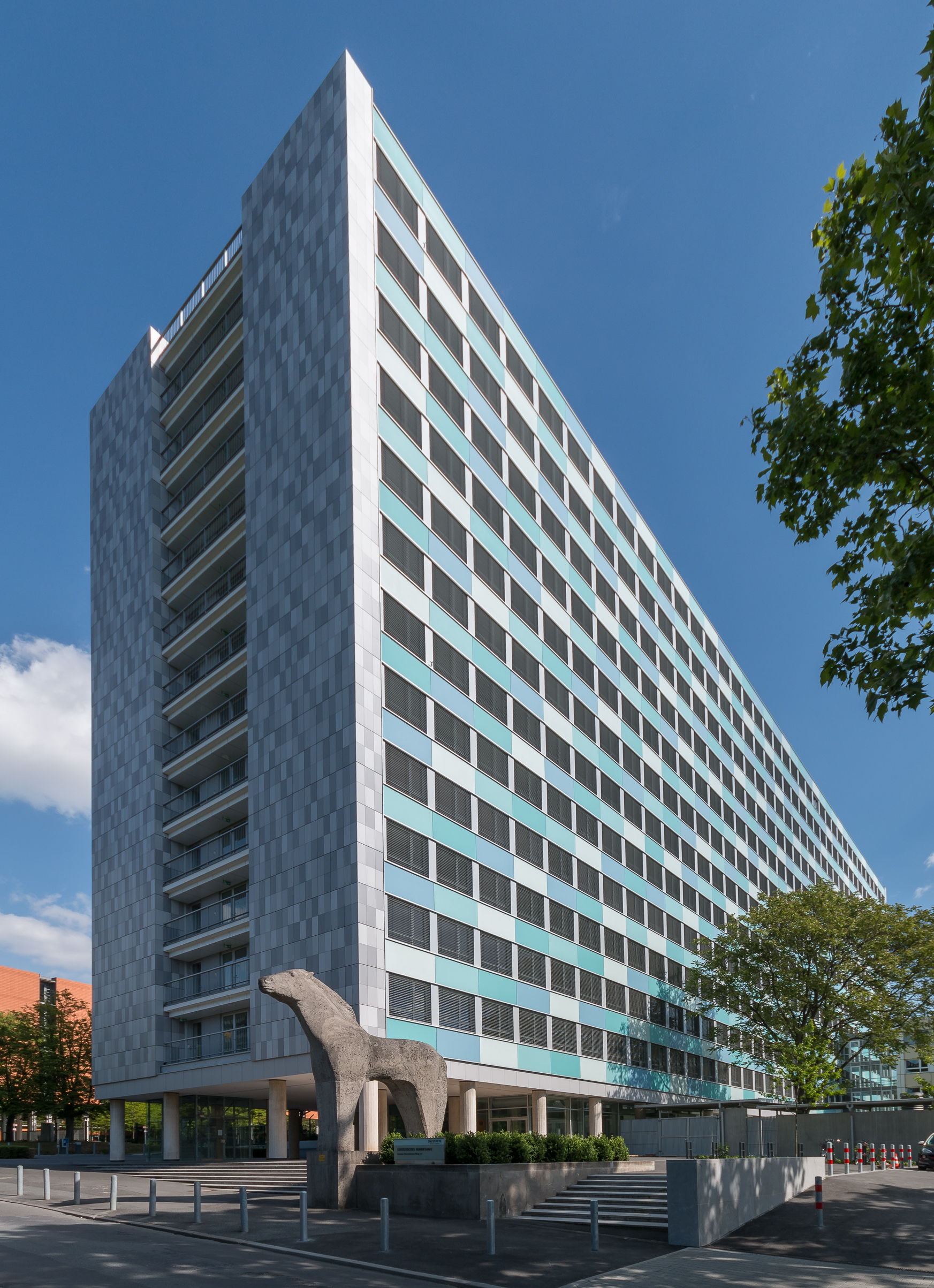
- Headquarters of the Federal Statistical Office in Wiesbaden

Agency overview
- Formed: 3 July 1953 (73 years ago)
- Jurisdiction: Government of Germany
- Headquarters: Wiesbaden, Germany; 50°04′16″N 8°15′08″E
- Employees: 2.147 (2025)
- Annual budget: €247 million (2026)
- Minister responsible: Alexander Dobrindt, German Interior Minister
- Agency executive: Dr. Ruth Brand, President
- Parent agency: Federal Ministry of the Interior
- Website: destatis.de

The Federal Statistical Office (German: Statistisches Bundesamt, shortened Destatis) is a federal authority of Germany. It reports to the Federal Ministry of the Interior.

The Office is responsible for collecting, processing, presenting and analysing statistical information concerning the topics economy, society and environment. The purpose is providing objective, independent and highly qualitative statistical information for the whole public. About 2300 staff members are employed in the departments in Wiesbaden, Bonn and Berlin. The department in Wiesbaden is the main office and runs the largest library specialised in statistical literature in Germany. It is also the Office of the President who is also by tradition, but not by virtue of the office, the Federal Returning Officer. In this position, they are the supervisor of the elections of the German Parliament ("Bundestag") and of the European Parliament.

The Berlin Information Point is the service centre of the Federal Office in the German capital and provides information and advisory services for the German Government, other federal authorities, embassies, industry and public, associations and all those who are interested in official statistics in Berlin and Brandenburg.

== See also ==
- Census in Germany
- List of statistical offices in Germany
