= Regiopolis =

City outside the core of a metropolitan area

The red circles indicate the possible regiopolises in Germany.

In Germany, a regiopolis is a city outside the core of a metropolitan area, that serves as an independent driving force for development within a larger region. The concept is used to denote midsized urban regions within regional, national and global contexts. For its surrounding region, the terms regiopolis region and regiopolitan area can be used and may be shortened to regio (similar to metropolitan area and metro).

The term regiopolis is a hybrid combination of the words region and polis (Greek: "city"), and is used in the context of urban and regional planning. It was developed by professors Iris Reuther and Jürgen Aring in Germany in 2006, with Rostock as the first model regiopolis. To use and further develop their common potential, various cooperations between the regiopolis, its surrounding region, business partners and the closest metropolitan areas are fostered.

== Characteristics ==
In contrast to a metropolis a regiopolis is a characterization of smaller scaled centers with a high functional importance for their hinterland. Thus they are mostly situated outside of metropolitan areas. Further characteristics are

- The size (not the biggest city within a country, but a size that matters within the national context)
- A good accessibility combined with a good infrastructure
- A high economical importance
- Location of global players and hidden champions
- A concentration of an innovative potential
- A university.

These characteristics have mainly been developed within the German framework; it is aimed to develop them further within a European context.

== Regiopolis Rostock ==
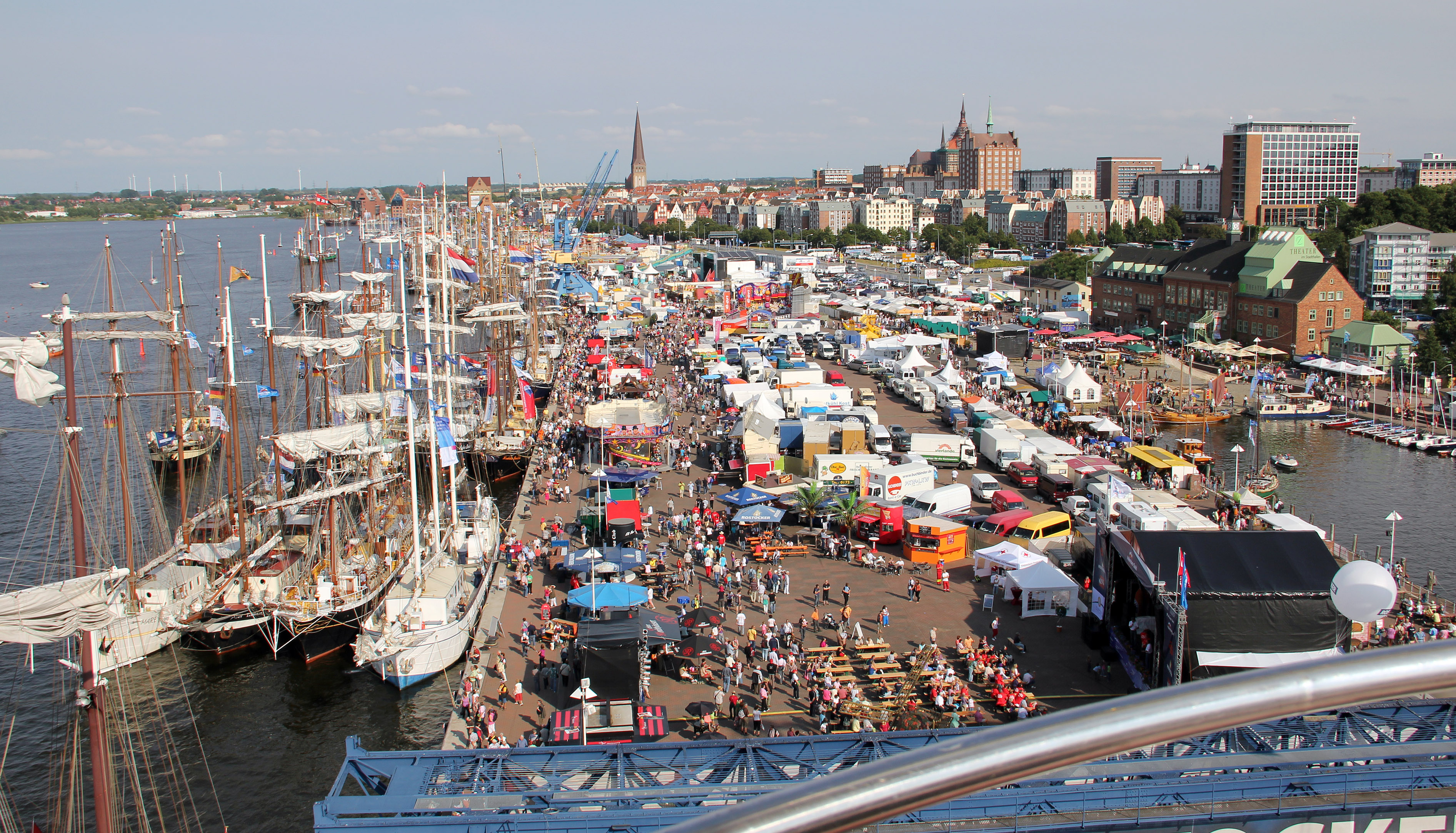
Rostock city harbour during Hanse Sail

The first German city region to work with the regiopolis concept is Rostock. A taskforce with different actors such as the hanseatic city of Rostock, the administrative district of Rostock, the Regional Planning Association Mid Mecklenburg/Rostock and the local business organizations is working on the promotion of the concept. They aim to build up a national and a European network of regiopolis, comparable to the network of European Metropolitan Regions and Areas.

=== Characteristics of the Rostock Regiopolis ===
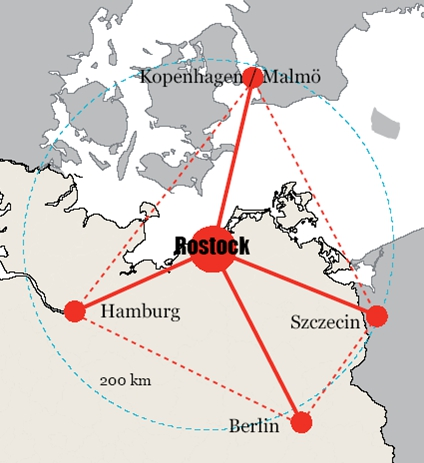
Location of the Rostock Regiopolis

- Rostock is the urban center in between the metropolitan areas of Hamburg to the west, Szczecin to the east, Copenhagen-Malmö to the north and Berlin to the south;
- Rostock region is the German gateway to the Baltic states, Russia and to Scandinavia;
- Rostock is the economically strongest city of Mecklenburg-Western Pomerania;
- Rostock Port is a major hub in Northern Germany;
- more than 30 of the 100 biggest enterprises in Mecklenburg-Western Pomerania operate in Rostock Region;
- the oldest university in Northern Europe is located in Rostock;
- Rostock is the biggest city in Mecklenburg-Western Pomerania, with more people moving in than moving out;
- Rostock Region lies on the European axis connecting the Baltic and the Adriatic Sea;
- Rostock is host to the annual "Hanse Sail" event;
- Rostock is the major destination of city tourism in Mecklenburg-Western Pomerania;
- Rostock Region is a location within the "BioConValley" research network.

=== Achievements ===
- The concept of Regiopolis was developed at the University of Kassel in 2006;
- Rostock was the first city to adopt the concept;
- since 2009 it has been more and more widely discussed within the region;
- the term is increasingly adopted by the federal and the state governments;
- in 2009 the first congress of German Regiopolises was initiated by the Rostock Region;
- in 2010 the first mayors’ conference of Rostock Region was held;
- in 2011 an informal meeting of representatives of potential other regiopolises was held in Berlin;
- in 2012 the agency of the Regiopolis has been established;
- A cooperation agreement has been signed by the main partners of Regiopolis Rostock - City of Rostock, administrative district Rostock, chamber of commerce Rostock, Ministry for Energy, Infrastructure and Regional Development Mecklenburg Western Pomerania and the planning association Region Rostock.
- In March 2013, the Regiopolis Rostock organized the workshop for "potential Regiopolises and other city-regions cooperation" in Berlin.
- In April 2013, the festival regio:polis has been organized for the first time. It displays the plurality of arts and cultural events in the Regiopolis of Rostock.
- A taskforce for the future development of the Rostock Regiopolis was established in 2013.
- In 2014, the Regiopolis Rostock celebrated the regio:polis festival again, this time with partners from Guldborgsund Municipality (Denmark).
- In 2015, the cities of Bielefeld and Paderborn started to adopt the concept. Erfurt is implementing it already.
- In 2022, the brand GREATER ROSTOCK was published. It communicates the strengths of the Regiopolis Rostock within Germany and abroad.

== See also ==
- Metropolitan area
- Metropolitan regions in Germany
