= Nuremberg Metropolitan Region =

Metropolitan region in Germany

Nuremberg Metropolitan Region Metropolregion Nuremberg
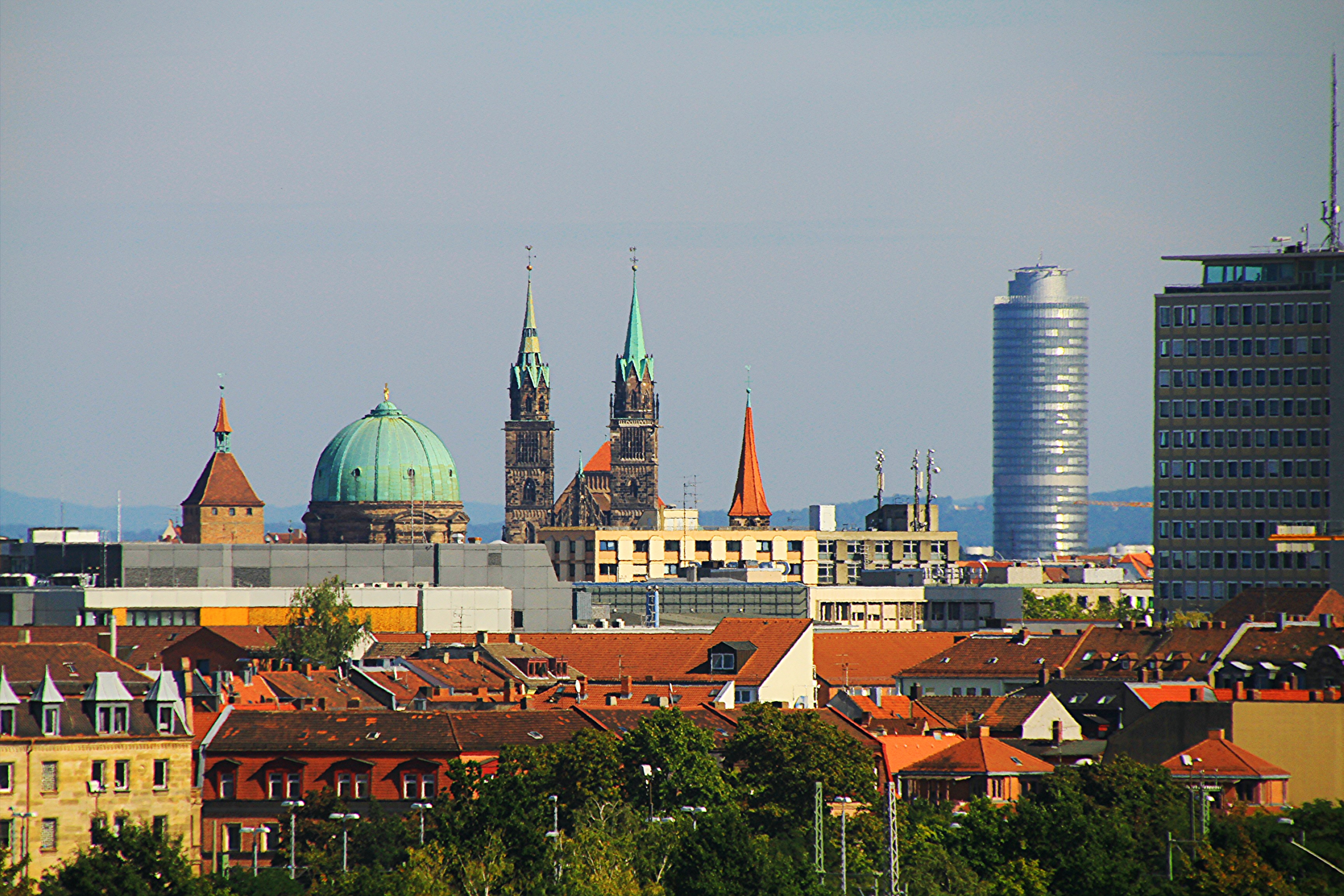
- Skyline of Nuremberg

- Flag Seal Logo

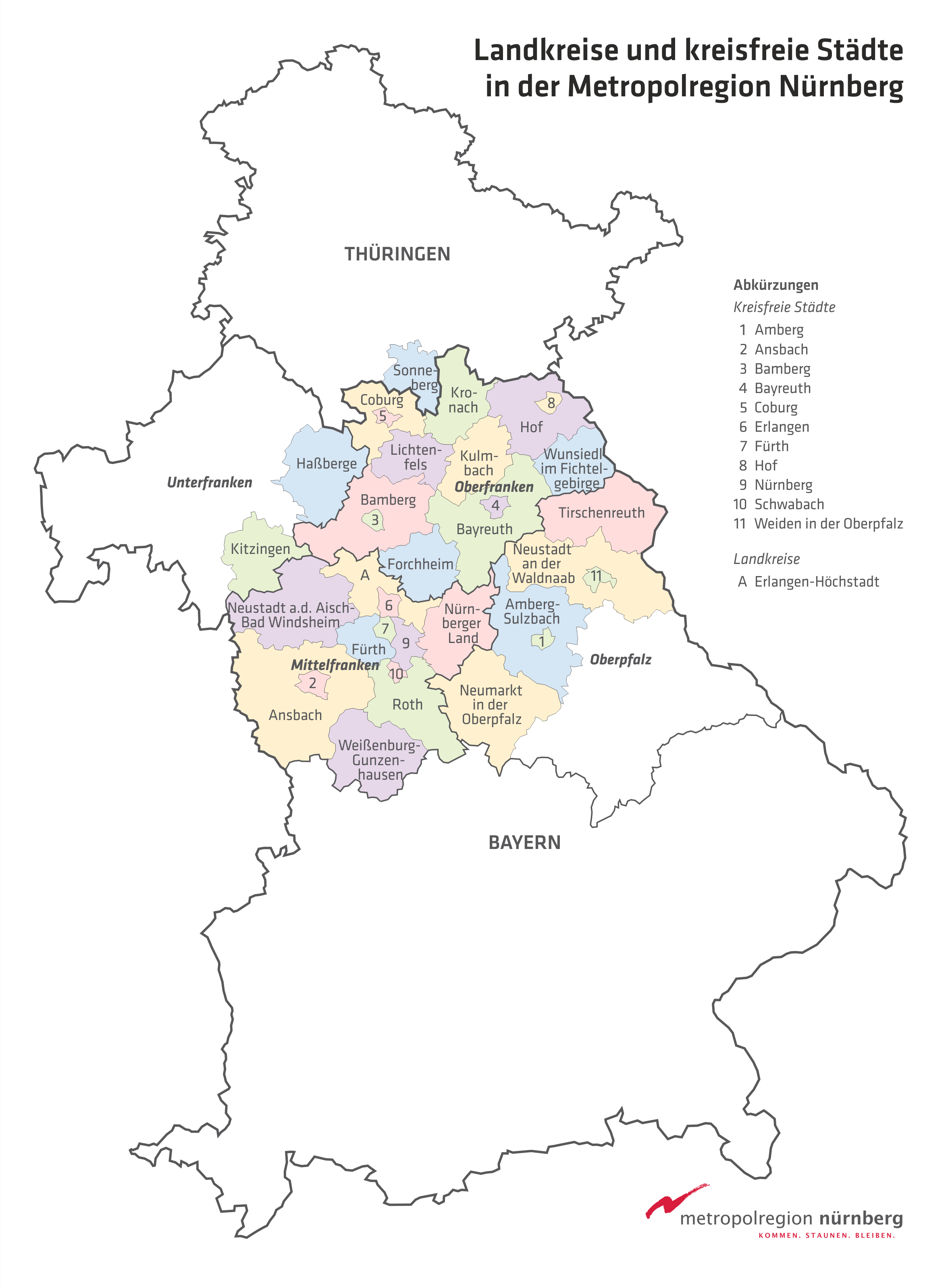
- Location of the Nuremberg Metropolitan Region in Bavaria
- Country: Germany
- States: Bavaria; Thuringia

Area
  - Metro: 21,800 km^{2} (8,400 sq mi)

Population
  - Metro: 3,610,543
  - Metro density: 166/km^{2} (429/sq mi)

GDP
  - Metro: €156.517 billion (2021)
- Time zone: UTC+1 (CET)
- Website: www.metropolregionnuernberg.de/en

The Nuremberg Metropolitan Region comprises 3.6 million people on 21,800 square kilometers. With a gross domestic product of 134 billion euros and about 1.9 million employees, this metropolitan region is one of the strongest economic areas in Germany. The major cities are Nuremberg, Fürth, Erlangen, Bayreuth and Bamberg.

== Geographic ==
The Nuremberg Metropolitan Region encloses geographically the administrative region of Middle Franconia, whole Upper Franconia, two territorial authorities of Lower Franconia and about half of the Upper Palatinate.

== Cities and rural district of the region ==
The region includes the cities Ansbach, Amberg, Bamberg, Bayreuth, Coburg, Erlangen, Fürth, Hof, Nuremberg, Schwabach and Weiden in der Oberpfalz as well as the rural districts of Amberg-Sulzbach, Ansbach, Bamberg, Bayreuth, Coburg, Erlangen-Höchstadt, Forchheim, Fürth, Haßberge, Hof, Kitzingen, Kronach, Kulmbach, Lichtenfels, Neumarkt, Neustadt (Aisch)-Bad Windsheim, Neustadt an der Waldnaab, Nürnberger Land, Roth, Sonneberg, Tirschenreuth, Weißenburg-Gunzenhausen and Wunsiedel.

== Education and research ==
In the metropolitan region of Nuremberg are several universities and Fachhochschulen (Universities of Applied Sciences). Some examples:

- Augustana Divinity School
- University of Bamberg
- University of Bayreuth
- Coburg University of Applied Sciences
- University of Erlangen-Nuremberg
- University of Applied Sciences Hof
- Academy of Fine Arts, Nuremberg
- Lutheran University of Applied Sciences Nuremberg
- Hochschule Weihenstephan-Triesdorf
- Hochschule für Musik Nürnberg
- University of Technology Nuremberg
- Ansbach University of Applied Sciences
