= Metropolitan regions in Germany =

The metropolitan regions of Germany

There are eleven metropolitan regions in Germany consisting of the country's most densely populated cities and their catchment areas. They represent Germany's political, commercial and cultural centres. The eleven metropolitan regions in Germany were organised into political units for planning purposes.

Based on a narrower definition of metropolises commonly used to determine the metropolitan status of a given city, four cities in Germany surpass the threshold of at least one million inhabitants within their administrative borders: Berlin, Hamburg, Munich, and Cologne.

For urban centres outside metropolitan areas that are a similar focal point for their region, but on a smaller scale, the concept of the Regiopolis and the related concepts of regiopolitan area or regio were introduced by urban and regional planning professors in 2006.

== Metropolitan regions ==
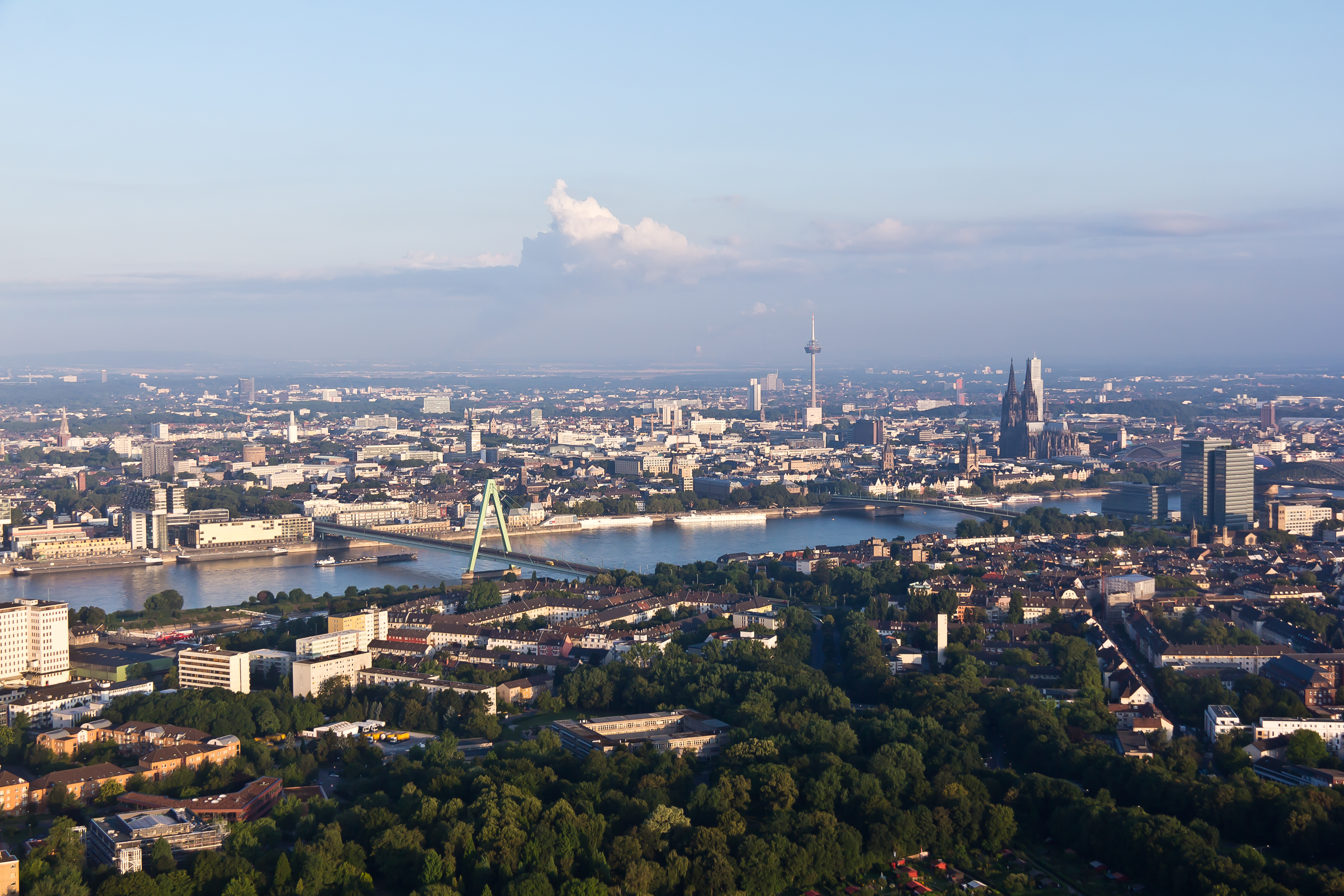
The four metropolitan areas of the Rhine-Ruhr metropolitan region, Germany's most populous metropolitan region: Essen, Dortmund, Düsseldorf, and Cologne

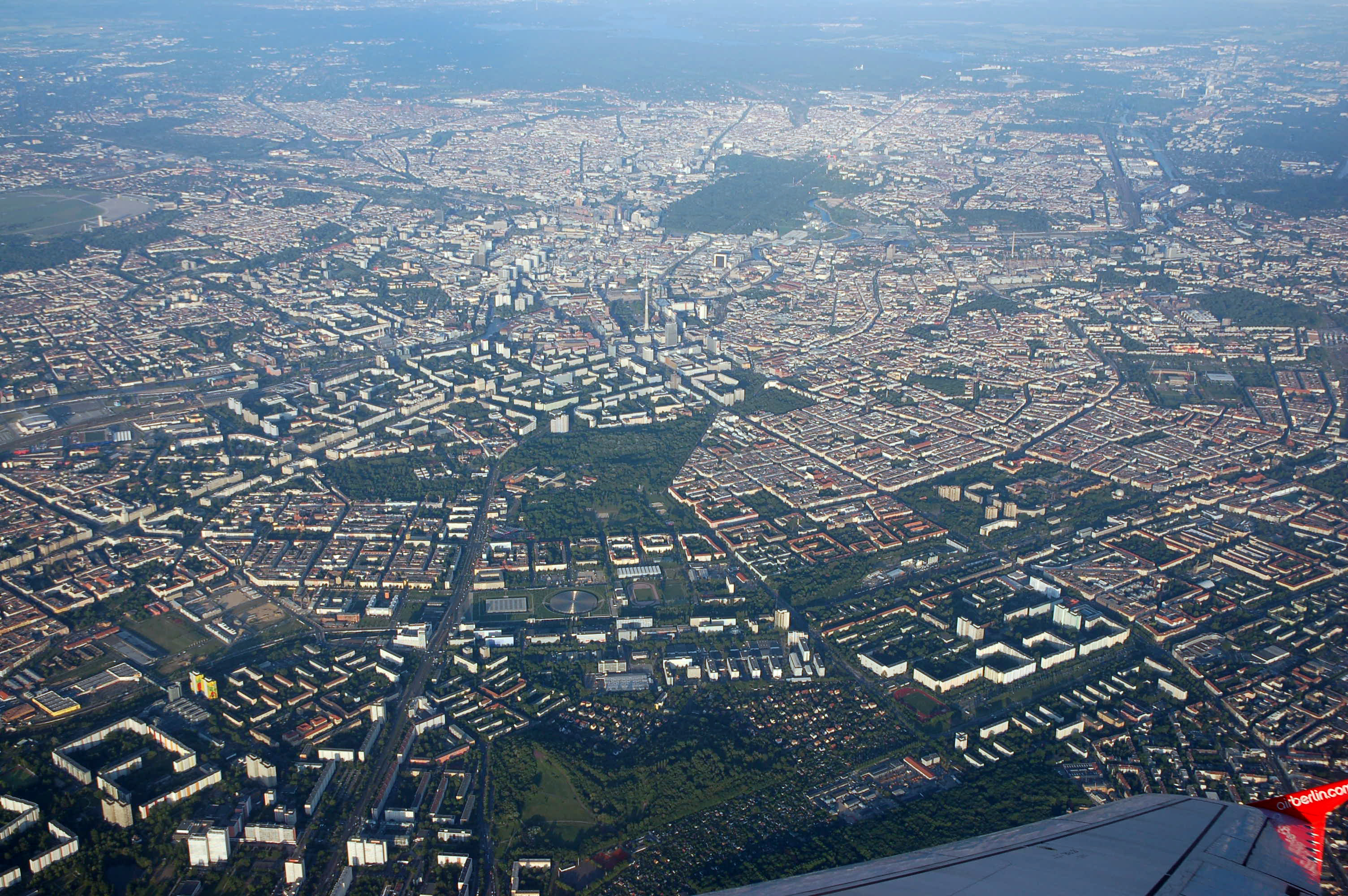
Berlin

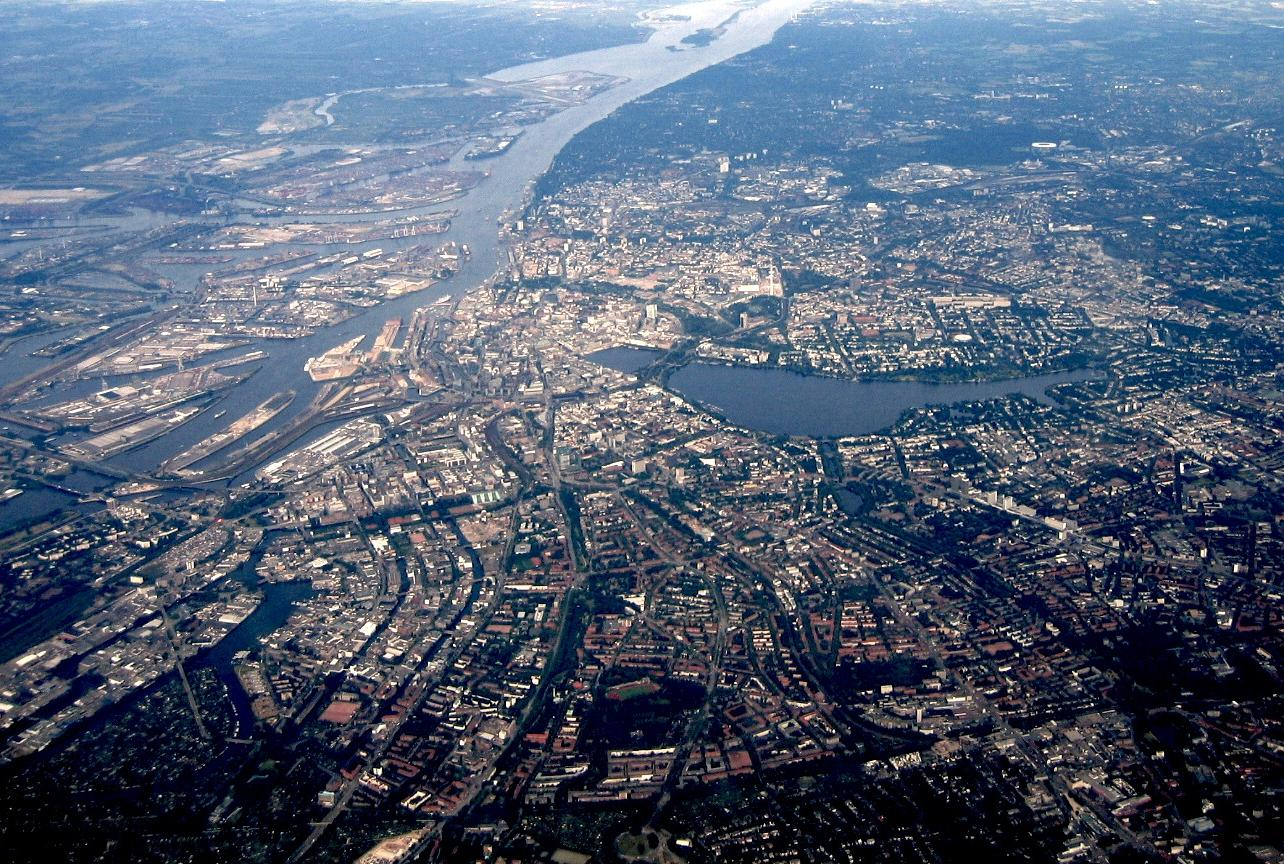
Hamburg

Sorted alphabetically:

1. Berlin/Brandenburg Metropolitan Region
2. Central German Metropolitan Region
3. Frankfurt/Rhine-Main Metropolitan Region
4. Hamburg Metropolitan Region
5. Hannover-Braunschweig-Göttingen-Wolfsburg Metropolitan Region
6. Munich Metropolitan Region
7. Northwest Metropolitan Region
8. Nuremberg Metropolitan Region
9. Rhine-Neckar Metropolitan Region
10. Rhine-Ruhr Metropolitan Region (also covers the Cologne Bonn Region)
11. Stuttgart Metropolitan Region

== Big five ==
The five most important regions, collectively often called the Big Five, are frequently compared with other European metropolitan regions (EMR) in terms of investment and market development. They are (from north to south): Hamburg, Berlin, the polycentric Ruhr-Düsseldorf-Cologne region (collectively referred to as Rhine-Ruhr), Frankfurt and Munich. The Globalization and World Cities Study Group (GaWC) considers Frankfurt and Munich as "α" (alpha) global cities, whereas the others are classified as "β" (beta) global cities.

Each of them forms types of clusters and achieves varying levels of performance in areas, including business activity, human capital, information and technology exchange, cultural experience, and political engagement.

- Hamburg
- Berlin
- Rhine-Ruhr
- Frankfurt/Rhine-Main
- Munich

== List ==
Rank	Metropolitan region (EMR)	Core cities	States	Population as by EMR (2006)	Population as by ESPON (2007)	GDP per capita in € (2006)	GMP in billion € (2006)	HQs of MNC (FG500)	Annual passenger traffic (2008)
1	Rhine-Ruhr EMR	K, DO, D, E, DU	NW	11.47 million	12.19 million	29,486	338.21	13	30.80 million
1	Ruhr	DO, E, DU, BO	NW	5.26 million	5.38 million	25,266	132.90	4	2.30 million (DTM)
1	Düsseldorf	D, W, MG	NW	3.12 million	3.07 million	34,658	108.13	5	18.15 million (DUS)
1	Cologne/Bonn	K, BN	NW	3.09 million	3.07 million	31,448	97.18	4	10.35 million (CGN)
2	Frankfurt/Rhine-Main EMR	F, WI, MZ, DA, OF, HU	HE, RP, BY	6.0million	4.15 million	35,000	193.20	4	57.44 million (FRA, HHN)
3	Berlin/Brandenburg EMR	B, P, CB	BE, BR	5.95 million	4.02 million	21,981	130.78	1	21.40 million (TXL, SXF)
4	Stuttgart EMR	S, RT, ES, HN	BW	5.29 million	—N/a	31,909	168.80	3	9.93 million
4	Stuttgart	S, ES	BW	2.67 million	2.67 million	35,492	94.76	3	9.93 million (STR)
5	Munich EMR	M, A, IN, LA, RO	BY	5.20 million	3.27 million	39,155	203.61	7	34.73 million
5	Munich	M, FS	BY	2.59 million	2.67 million	47,943	124.35	7	34.73 million (MUC)
6	Central German EMR	L, DD, C, HAL, EF	SN, ST, TH	4.36 million	—N/a	21,482	93.66	0	4.88 million
6	Leipzig/Halle	L, HAL	SN, ST, TH	1.50 million	1.21 million	no data	no data	0	2.46 million (LEJ)
6	Dresden	DD, PIR	SN, ST, TH	0.70 million	0.88 million	no data	no data	0	1.86 million (DRS)
7	Hamburg EMR	HH, HL	HH, SH, NI	4.27 million	2.98 million	33,210	141.81	2	12.84 million (HAM)
8	Hanover-Braunschweig- Göttingen-Wolfsburg EMR	H, BS, GÖ, WOB, SZ, HI	NI	3.91 million	—N/a	27,251	106.55	3	5.74 million
8	Braunschweig/Wolfsburg	BS, WOB, SZ	NI	1.00 million	1.00 million	no data	no data	1	0.10 million (BWE)
8	Hanover	H	NI	1.12 million*	1.00 million	no data	no data	2	5.64 million (HAJ)
9	Nuremberg EMR	N, FÜ, ER, BT, BA	BY	3.51 million	—N/a	29,955	105.14	0	4.27 million
9	Nuremberg/Furth/Erlangen	N, FÜ, ER	BY	1.29 million	1.58 million	no data	no data	0	4.27 million (NUE)
10	Bremen/Oldenburg EMR	HB, OL, HBx, DEL, WHV	HB, NI	2.37 million	1.08 million	27,046	64.10	0	2.49 million (BRE)
11	Rhine-Neckar EMR	MA, LU, HD, WO	BW, RP, HE	2.36 million	2.93 million	29,891	70.54	1	0
	metropolitan regions in Germany			57.74 million		29,412	1,698.23	34	168.75 million
	Germany			80.22 million		28,212	2,322.20	37	191.02 million

highest score of all metropolitan regions
highest score of all metropolitan areas

== See also ==
- Largest European metropolitan areas
- Largest urban areas of the European Union
- Demographics of Germany
- Tourism in Germany
