= Munich Metropolitan Region =

Metropolitan region in Germany

Coordinates: 48°8′18.96″N 11°34′35.4″E

Munich Metropolitan Region Metropolregion München
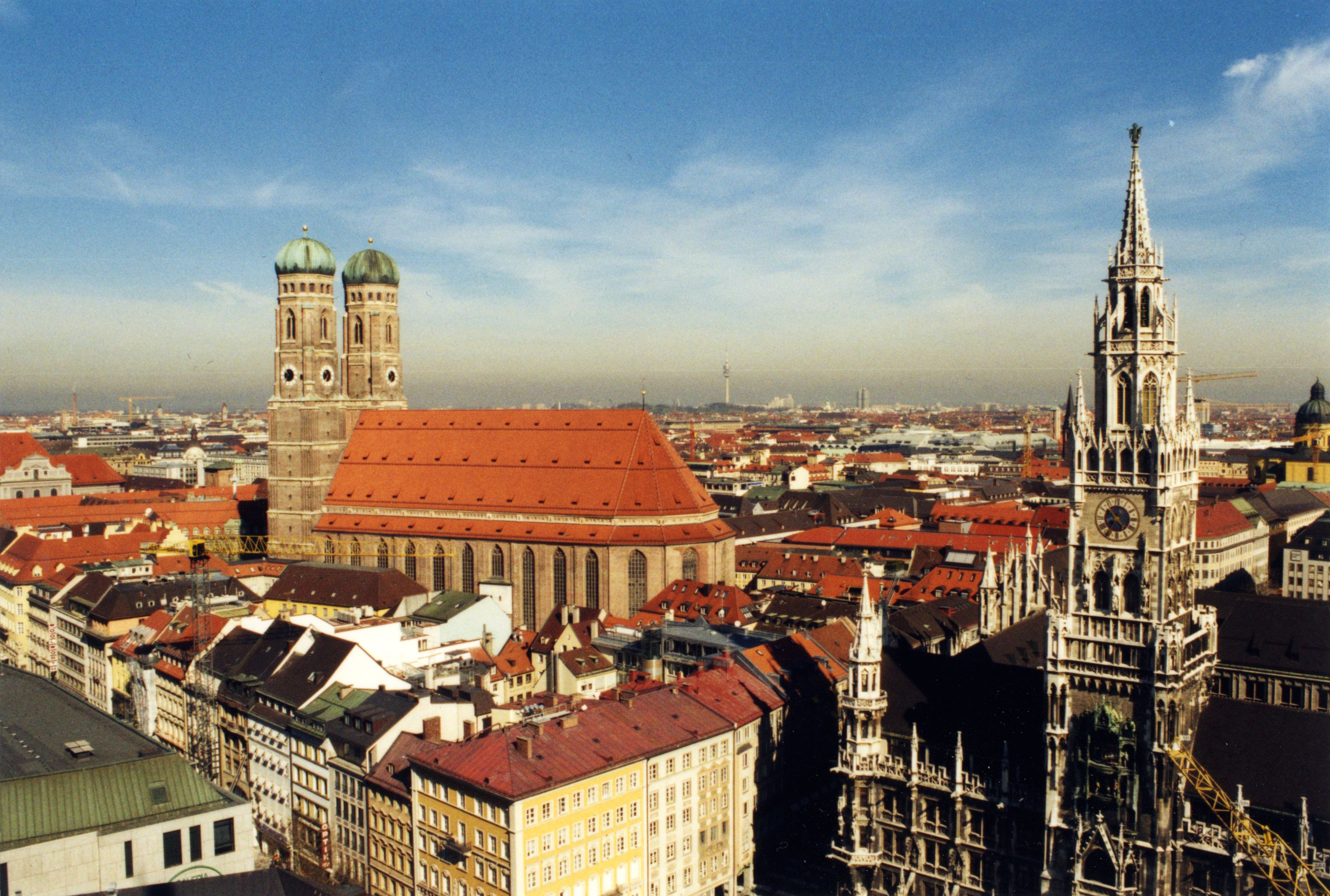
- Central Munich

- Flag Seal

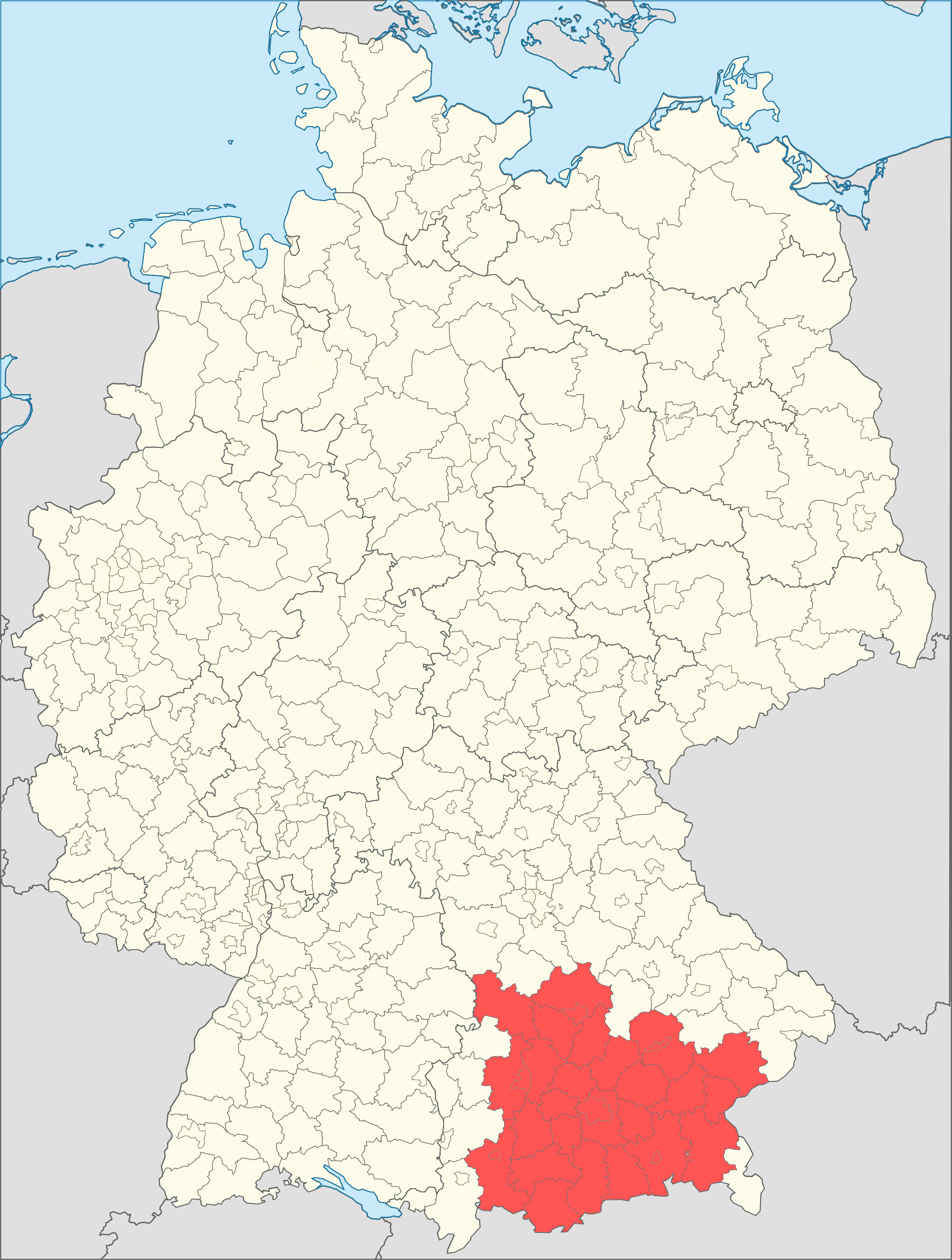
- Location of the Munich Metropolitan Region in Bavaria
- Country: Germany
- States: Bavaria
- Largest Cities: Munich, Augsburg, Ingolstadt, Landshut, Rosenheim, Landsberg am Lech
- Established: 1 January 2008

Area
  - Metro: 27,700 km^{2} (10,700 sq mi)

Population
  - Metro: 6,200,000
  - Metro density: 220/km^{2} (580/sq mi)

GDP
  - Metro: €361.310 billion (2021)
- Time zone: UTC+1 (CET)
- Website: www.metropolregion-muenchen.eu

The Munich Metropolitan Region is one of eleven metropolitan regions in Germany, consisting of the agglomeration areas of Munich, Augsburg, Ingolstadt, Landshut, Rosenheim and Landsberg am Lech. It is Germany's richest and second most populous metropolitan region after the Rhine-Ruhr Metropolitan-Region, and before Frankfurt Rhine-Main-Region, the Berlin-Brandenburg Metropolitan-Region and the Stuttgart Metropolitan-Region.

== Metropolitan Region ==
- State: Bavaria
- Districts: Lower Bavaria, Upper Bavaria, Swabia
- Area: 27,700 km^{2} (40% of the state of Bavaria)
- Population: 5,991,144
- GDP: 210 billion euro (53% of the Bavarian GDP)

In comparison to the other ten German Metropolitan Regions, the Munich Metropolitan Region had:

- the highest population growth (about 5% from 1997 to 2004)
- the largest increase in employment (over 5% from 1997 to 2004)
- the highest gross value added per employed person (2003)
- the highest tax revenue per inhabitant (2003)

== Larger Urban Zone ==
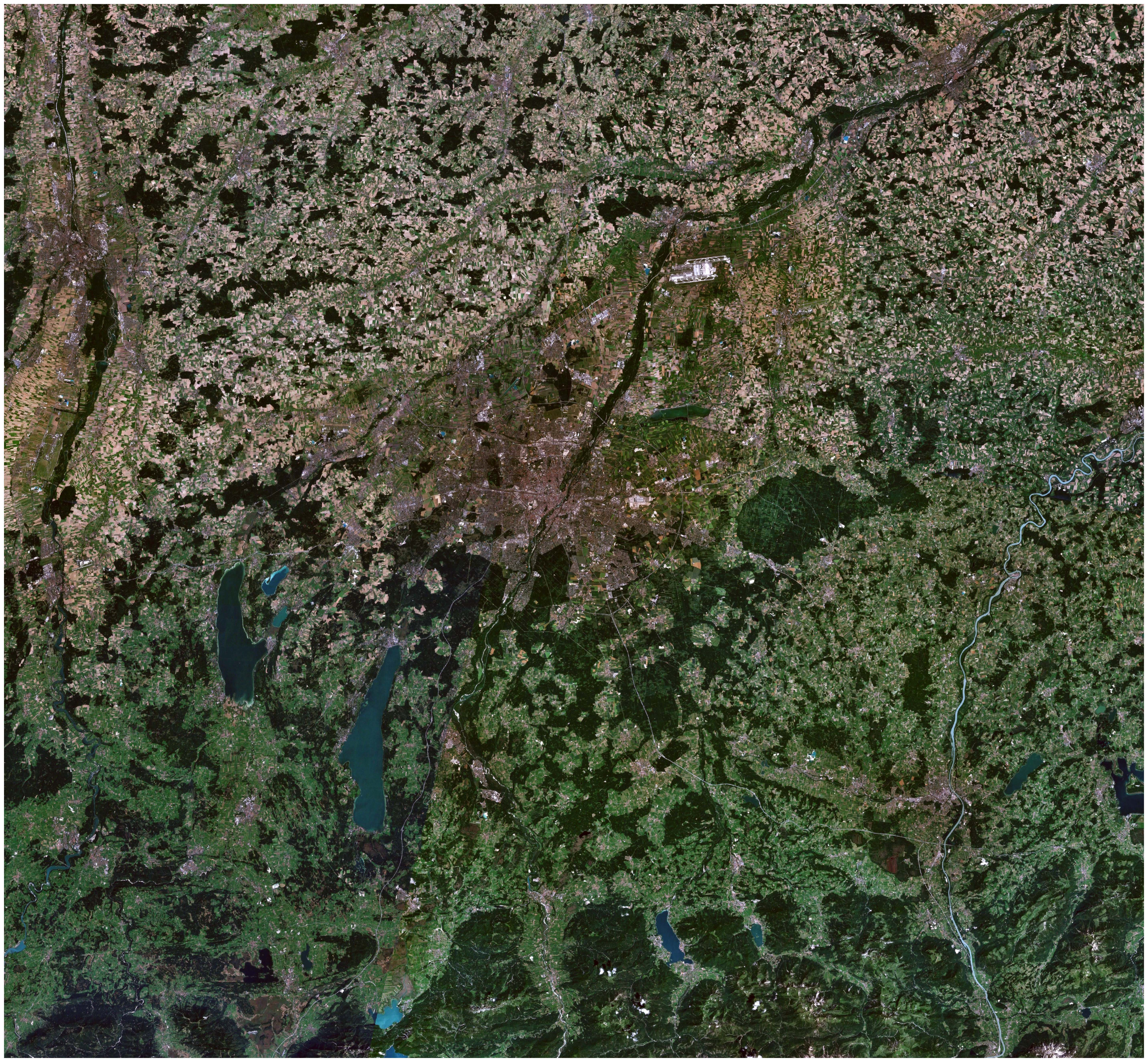
Satellite view of the Munich Larger Urban Zone

The Munich Larger Urban Zone (LUZ) as defined by Eurostat's Urban Audit covers an area of 5,500 km^{2} and in 2004 contained 2,531,706 inhabitants (pop. density 460,31/km^{2}). The Larger Urban Zone covers the following cities and districts:

- Stadt München
- Landkreis Dachau
- Landkreis Ebersberg
- Landkreis Erding
- Landkreis Freising
- Landkreis Fürstenfeldbruck
- Landkreis Landsberg am Lech
- Landkreis München
- Landkreis Starnberg
