= List of metropolitan areas by GDP =

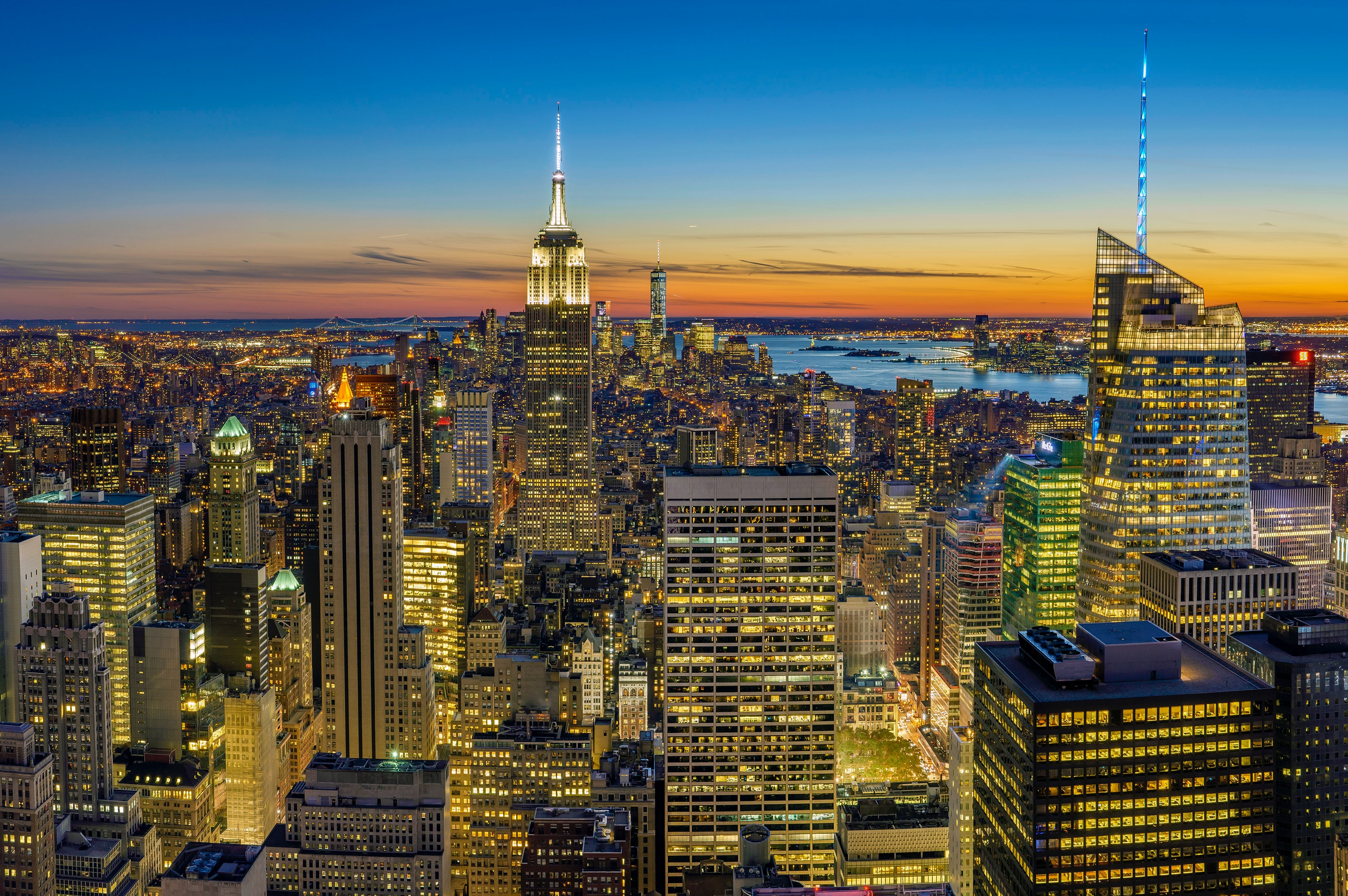
Manhattan, the economic anchor of the New York metropolitan area, the world’s principal fintech and financial center and epicenter of the world's economy, and the largest metropolitan economy in the world, with a 2026 nominal gross metropolitan product of just over US$2.6 trillion.

This is a list of largest metropolitan areas by their gross domestic product (GDP) in United States Dollars as well as their local currency. Only metropolitan areas with a GDP of over US$100 billion are included.

== Breakdown by region ==
Breakdown by region
Rank	Region	>US$100 billion	>US$500 billion	>US$1 trillion	>US$2 trillion
1	East and South East Asia	58	7	1	0
2	Northern America	48	12	3	1
3	Europe	41	4	1	0
4	West and South Asia	13	0	0	0
5	Latin America	8	0	0	0
6	Australia and Oceania	5	0	0	0
7	Africa	3	0	0	0

== East and South East Asia ==
Rank	Metropolitan area	Country/Region	GDP (local currency)	GDP (billion US$)	Year
1	Greater Tokyo Area	Japan	JP¥ 239,118.000 billion	1,766.000	2022
2	Seoul metropolitan area	South Korea	KR₩ 1,352,000.000 billion	946.429	2024
3	Shanghai	China	CN¥ 5,670.000 billion	814.100	2025
4	Beijing	China	CN¥ 5,207.000 billion	747.000	2025
5	Keihanshin	Japan	JP¥ 92,618.000 billion	685.000	2022
6	Shenzhen	China	CN¥ 3,873.000 billion	557.320	2025
7	Singapore	Singapore	S$732.000 billion	547.387	2024
8	Chongqing	China	CN¥ 3,376.000 billion	484.600	2025
9	Guangzhou	China	CN¥ 3,200.000 billion	460.000	2025
10	Nagoya metropolitan area	Japan	JP¥ 59,799.000 billion	460.000	2022
11	Jakarta metropolitan area	Indonesia	IDR 6,891,222.000 billion	434.389	2024
12	Greater Taipei Area	Taiwan	NT$12,138.000 billion	407.838	2021
13	Hong Kong	Hong Kong	HK$3,176.993 billion	407.176	2024
14	Suzhou	China	CN¥ 2,770.000 billion	397.600	2025
15	Chengdu	China	CN¥ 2,480.000 billion	355.490	2025
16	Hangzhou	China	CN¥ 2,300.000 billion	330.450	2025
17	Wuhan	China	CN¥ 2.215.000 billion	317.930	2025
18	Nanjing	China	CN¥ 1.940.000 billion	278.900	2025
19	Mega Manila	Philippines	₱ 15,789.449 billion	274.736	2025
20	Ningbo	China	CN¥ 1,871.600 billion	274.000	2025
21	Tianjin	China	CN¥ 1,850.000 billion	266.000	2025
22	Busan–Gyeongnam Area	South Korea	KR₩ 366,264.000 billion	256.385	2024
23	Qingdao	China	CN¥ 1,773.000 billion	254.600	2025
24	Bangkok Metropolitan Region	Thailand	THB 8,830.000 billion	250.772	2024
25	Wuxi	China	CN¥ 1,626.329 billion	228.362	2024
26	Changsha	China	CN¥ 1,526.878 billion	214.398	2024
27	Zhengzhou	China	CN¥ 1,453.210 billion	204.054	2024
28	Fuzhou	China	CN¥ 1,423.676 billion	199.907	2024
29	Jinan	China	CN¥ 1,352.760 billion	189.949	2024
30	Hefei	China	CN¥ 1,350.770 billion	189.770	2024
31	Foshan	China	CN¥ 1,336.190 billion	187.622	2024
32	Quanzhou	China	CN¥ 1,309.487 billion	183.873	2024
33	Xi'an	China	CN¥ 1,331.778 billion	187.003	2024
34	Nantong	China	CN¥ 1,242.190 billion	174.423	2024
35	Dongguan	China	CN¥ 1,228.215 billion	172.461	2024
36	Fukuoka–Kitakyushu	Japan	JP¥ 19,047.000 billion	155.000	2022
37	Greater Kuala Lumpur	Malaysia	MYR 697,790.000 billion	152.643	2024
38	Changzhou	China	CN¥ 1,081.860 billion	151.840	2024
39	Yantai	China	CN¥ 1,078.283 billion	151.408	2023
40	Daegu metropolitan area	South Korea	KR₩ 209,222.000 billion	146.456	2024
41	Tangshan	China	CN¥ 1,000.390 billion	140.471	2024
42	Surabaya metropolitan area	Indonesia	IDR 2,218,560.000 billion	139.847	2024
43	Wenzhou	China	CN¥ 971.880 billion	136.476	2024
44	Xuzhou	China	CN¥ 953.712 billion	133.916	2024
45	Dalian	China	CN¥ 951.690 billion	133.632	2024
46	Shenyang	China	CN¥ 902.710 billion	126.755	2024
47	Xiamen	China	CN¥ 858.901 billion	120.603	2024
48	Shaoxing	China	CN¥ 836.860 billion	117.508	2024
49	Ho Chi Minh City metropolitan area	Vietnam	VND 3,088,000.000 billion	117.300	2023
50	Kunming	China	CN¥ 827.522 billion	116.197	2024
51	Shijiazhuang	China	CN¥ 820.340 billion	115.189	2024
52	Weifang	China	CN¥ 820.320 billion	115.186	2024
53	Yangzhou	China	CN¥ 780.964 billion	109.660	2024
54	Nanchang	China	CN¥ 780.037 billion	109.530	2024
55	Yancheng	China	CN¥ 777.920 billion	109.232	2024
56	Changchun	China	CN¥ 763.219 billion	107.168	2024
57	Jiaxing	China	CN¥ 756.953 billion	106.288	2024
58	Yulin, Shaanxi	China	CN¥ 754.868 billion	105.995	2024

== West and South Asia ==
Rank	Metropolitan area	Country	GDP (local currency)	GDP (billion US$)	Year
1	Istanbul metropolitan area	Turkey	₺ 13,011.000 billion	396.300	2024
2	Tel Aviv metropolitan area	Israel	₪ 822.25 billion	267.000	2025
3	Riyadh	Saudi Arabia	SAR 925.600 billion	246.835	2023
4	Dubai-Sharjah-Ajman metropolitan area	UAE	AED 744.800 billion	224.100	2024
5	Doha metropolitan area	Qatar	QAR 775.331 billion	213.003	2023
6	Mumbai Metropolitan Region	India	₹ 17,065.050 billion	196.248	2025
7	Abu Dhabi	UAE	AED 554.600 billion	151.000	2022
8	Ankara metropolitan area	Turkey	₺ 4,673.000 billion	142.300	2024
9	Delhi metropolitan area	India	₹ 11,077.460 billion	133.000	2024
10	Greater Bangalore	India	₹ 11,239.000 billion	130.000	2024
11	Chennai metropolitan area	India	₹ 10,288.000 billion	119.000	2024
12	Jeddah	Saudi Arabia	SAR 441.375 billion	117.700	2022
13	Kolkata Metropolitan Region	India	₹ 9,597.000 billion	111.000	2024
14	Baghdad	Iraq	IQD 139,111.66 billion	106.184	2025
15	Dammam metropolitan area	Saudi Arabia	SAR 396.375 billion	105.700	2022

== Europe ==
Rank	Metropolitan area	Country	GDP (local currency)	GDP (billion US$)	Year
1	London metropolitan area	United Kingdom	£903.694 billion	1,124.105	2023
2	Paris metropolitan area	France	€865.652 billion	936.809	2024
3	Randstad	Netherlands	€602.711 billion	710.587	2024
5	Moscow metropolitan area	Russia	₽51,890.000 billion	704.510	2024
4	Rhine-Ruhr metropolitan region	Germany	€576.000 billion	606.989	2022
6	Munich Metropolitan Region	Germany	€361.310 billion	427.430	2021
7	Rhine-Main Metropolitan Region	Germany	€300.868 billion	355.927	2021
8	Berlin/Brandenburg Metropolitan Region	Germany	€322.388 billion	348.888	2024
9	Madrid Metropolitan Area	Spain	€316.193 billion	342.184	2024
10	Stuttgart Metropolitan Region	Germany	€275.060 billion	325.396	2021
11	Greater Dublin Area	Ireland	€289.800 billion	313.592	2024
12	Hamburg Metropolitan Region	Germany	€249.406 billion	295.047	2021
13	Milan metropolitan area	Italy	€230.701 billion	249.641	2023
14	Barcelona metropolitan area	Spain	€209.564 billion	226.769	2023
15	Rome metropolitan area	Italy	€201.177 billion	217.693	2023
16	Brussels metropolitan area	Belgium	€200.457 billion	211.242	2022
17	Hanover–Braunschweig–Göttingen–Wolfsburg Metropolitan Region	Germany	€169.198 billion	200.161	2021
18	Stockholm metropolitan area	Sweden	€179.239 billion (Note: Although the euro is not the official currency of Sweden, it is used for Eurostat statistics.)	193.972	2024
19	Copenhagen metropolitan area	Denmark	€178.834 billion (Note: Although the euro is not the official currency of Denmark, it is used for Eurostat statistics.)	188.455	2022
20	Nuremberg Metropolitan Region	Germany	€156.517 billion	185.160	2021
21	Zurich metropolitan area	Switzerland	CHF 164.495 billion	172.407	2022
22	Warsaw metropolitan area	Poland	€156.556 billion (Note: Although the euro is not the official currency of Poland, it is used for Eurostat statistics.)	165.425	2024
23	Aix-Marseille-Provence Metropolis	France	€125.382 billion	148.327	2021
24	Oslo metropolitan area	Norway	€132.716 billion (Note: Although the euro is not the official currency of Norway, it is used for Eurostat statistics.)	139.856	2022
25	Saint Petersburg metropolitan area	Russia	₽12,945.756 billion	139.814	2023
26	Greater Manchester	United Kingdom	£110.152 billion	137.018	2023
27	Metropolitan Cork	Ireland	€115.681 billion	136.851	2021
28	Prague metropolitan area	Czech Republic	€126.315 billion (Note: Although the euro is not the official currency of the Czech Republic, it is used for Eurostat statistics.)	136.698	2024
29	Vienna metropolitan area	Austria	€124.861 billion	135.125	2024
30	Northwest Metropolitan Region	Germany	€108.006 billion	127.771	2021
31	Lisbon metropolitan area	Portugal	€106.006 billion	125.516	2024
32	Athens metropolitan area	Greece	€115.495 billion	124.988	2024
33	Rhine-Neckar Metropolitan Region	Germany	€105.201 billion	124.453	2021
34	Central German Metropolitan Region	Germany	€102.532 billion	121.295	2021
35	Helsinki metropolitan area	Finland	€108.495 billion	117.413	2024
36	Metropolis of Lyon	France	€97.306 billion	115.113	2021
37	Birmingham metropolitan area	United Kingdom	£92.443 billion	114.990	2023
38	Bucharest metropolitan area	Romania	€104.409 billion (Note: Although the euro is not the official currency of Romania, it is used for Eurostat statistics.)	112.991	2024
39	Budapest metropolitan area	Hungary	€104.391 billion (Note: Although the euro is not the official currency of Hungary, it is used for Eurostat statistics.)	112.972	2024
40	Gothenburg metropolitan area	Sweden	€93.679 billion (Note: Although the euro is not official currency of Sweden, it is used for Eurostat statistics.)	101.379	2024
41	Leeds metropolitan area	United Kingdom	£81.279 billion	101.103	2023

== Africa ==
Rank	Metropolitan area	Country	GDP (local currency)	GDP (billion US$)	Year
1	Johannesburg metropolitan area	South Africa	ZAR 2,442.000 billion	165.220	2024
2	Lagos metropolitan area	Nigeria	NGN 46,200.000 billion	114.500	2022
3	Greater Cairo	Egypt	EGP 4,555.849 billion	103.600	2024

== Northern America ==
Rank	Metropolitan area	Country	GDP (local currency)	GDP (billion US$)	Year
1	New York metropolitan area	United States	US$2,298.868 billion	2,298.868	2023
2	Greater Los Angeles	United States	US$1,295.361 billion	1,295.361	2023
3	San Francisco Bay Area	United States	US$1,201.695 billion	1,201.695	2023
4	Chicago metropolitan area	United States	US$894.862 billion	894.862	2023
5	Dallas–Fort Worth metroplex	United States	US$744.654 billion	744.654	2023
6	Washington metropolitan area	United States	US$714.685 billion	714.685	2023
7	Greater Houston	United States	US$696.999 billion	696.999	2023
8	Greater Boston	United States	US$610.486 billion	610.486	2022
9	Metro Atlanta	United States	US$570.663 billion	570.663	2023
10	Seattle metropolitan area	United States	US$566.742 billion	566.742	2023
11	Greater Philadelphia	United States	US$557.601 billion	557.601	2023
12	Miami metropolitan area	United States	US$533.674 billion	533.674	2023
13	Greater Toronto Area	Canada	CA$522.379 billion	401.605	2022
14	Phoenix metropolitan area	United States	US$398.129 billion	398.129	2023
15	Minneapolis–Saint Paul	United States	US$350.710 billion	350.710	2023
16	Metro Detroit	United States	US$331.333 billion	331.333	2023
17	San Diego metropolitan area	United States	US$314.943 billion	314.943	2023
18	Denver metropolitan area	United States	US$311.876 billion	311.876	2023
19	Baltimore metropolitan area	United States	US$259.690 billion	259.690	2023
20	Charlotte metropolitan area	United States	US$255.666 billion	255.666	2023
21	Greater Austin	United States	US$248.110 billion	248.110	2023
22	Tampa Bay area	United States	US$243.268 billion	242.268	2023
23	Greater St. Louis	United States	US$226.549 billion	226.549	2023
24	Portland metropolitan area	United States	US$218.894 billion	218.894	2023
25	Greater Orlando	United States	US$217.038 billion	217.038	2023
26	Greater Montreal	Canada	CA$279.501 billion	214.880	2022
27	Nashville metropolitan area	United States	US$204.861 billion	204.861	2023
28	Indianapolis metropolitan area	United States	US$199.198 billion	199.198	2023
29	Cincinnati metropolitan area	United States	US$198.889 billion	198.889	2023
30	Greater Pittsburgh	United States	US$194.230 billion	194.230	2023
31	Greater Sacramento	United States	US$189.624 billion	189.624	2023
32	Kansas City metropolitan area	United States	US$185.746 billion	185.746	2023
33	Greater San Antonio	United States	US$182.139 billion	182.139	2023
34	Columbus metropolitan area	United States	US$182.087 billion	182.087	2023
35	Las Vegas Valley	United States	US$178.388 billion	178.388	2023
36	Greater Cleveland	United States	US$173.134 billion	173.134	2023
37	Greater Vancouver	Canada	CA$202.459 billion	155.650	2022
38	Salt Lake City metropolitan area	United States	US$147.519 billion	147.519	2023
39	Research Triangle	United States	US$133.081 billion	133.081	2023
40	Milwaukee metropolitan area	United States	US$130.857 billion	130.857	2023
41	Jacksonville metropolitan area	United States	US$129.095 billion	129.095	2023
42	Hampton Roads	United States	US$127.459 billion	127.459	2023
43	Greater Hartford	United States	US$122.805 billion	122.805	2023
44	Greater Bridgeport	United States	US$116.031 billion	116.031	2023
45	Providence metropolitan area	United States	US$111.840 billion	111.840	2023
46	Memphis metropolitan area	United States	US$102.934 billion	102.934	2023
47	New Orleans metropolitan area	United States	US$102.437 billion	102.437	2023
48	Oklahoma City metropolitan area	United States	US$100.054 billion	100.054	2023

== Latin America ==
Rank	Metropolitan area	Country	GDP (local currency)	GDP (billion US$)	Year
1	Greater Mexico City	Mexico	MXN 8,134.330 billion	401.280	2024
2	Greater São Paulo	Brazil	R$1,596.500 billion	338.860	2024
3	Greater Buenos Aires	Argentina	ARS 2,167.433 billion	235.600	2023
4	Rio de Janeiro metropolitan area	Brazil	R$859.000 billion	171.800	2023
5	Greater Monterrey	Mexico	MXN 2,725.351 billion	148.847	2024
6	Santiago Metropolitan Region	Chile	CLP 85,867.000 billion	128.800	2023
7	Metropolitan Area of Bogotá	Colombia	COP 334,299.466 billion	121.800	2023
8	Lima Metropolitan Area	Peru	PEN 431.698 billion	114.400	2023

== Australia and Oceania ==
Rank	Metropolitan area	Country	GDP (local currency)	GDP (billion US$)	Year
1	Greater Sydney	Australia	AU$ 490.000 billion	368.137	2021
2	Melbourne metropolitan area	Australia	AU$ 390.800 billion	293.608	2020
3	Perth metropolitan area	Australia	AU$ 202.500 billion	152.138	2020
4	Greater Brisbane	Australia	AU$ 195.600 billion	146.954	2020
5	Auckland metropolitan area	New Zealand	NZ$166.963 billion	101.612	2024

== See also ==
- List of first-level administrative divisions by GRDP
- List of cities by GDP
- List of largest cities
