= Greater Tokyo Area =

Metropolitan area in Japan

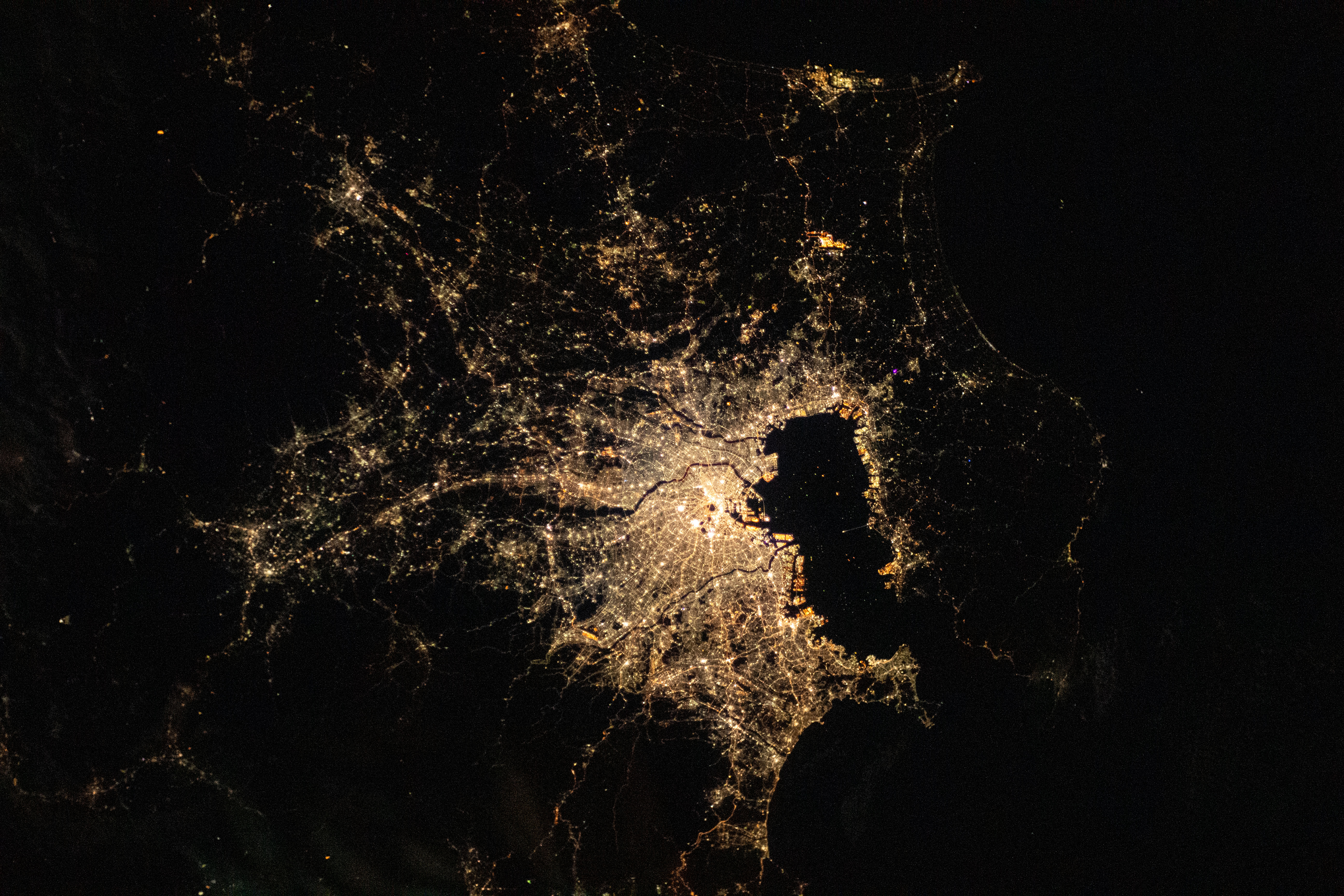
- Greater Tokyo area around Tokyo Bay at night (2021)

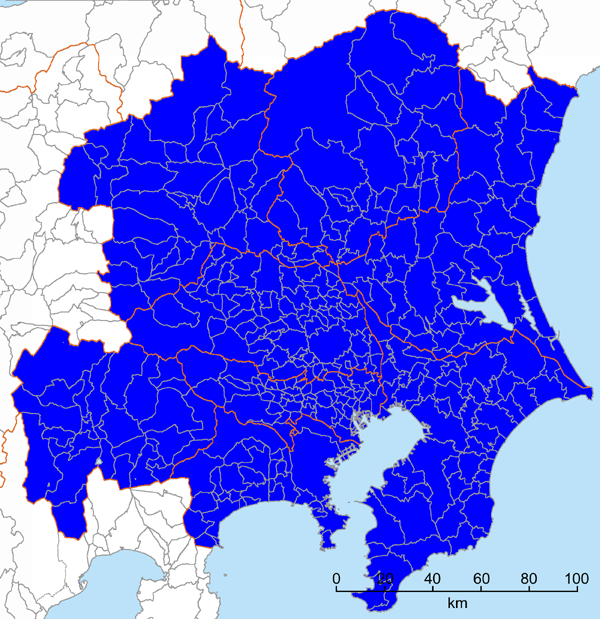
- Greater Tokyo Area
- Coordinates: 35°41′23″N 139°41′30″E
- Major Cities: Tokyo Metropolis (includes 23 special wards); Yokohama; Kawasaki; Saitama; Kawaguchi; Chiba; Sagamihara

Area
  - Urban: 8,547 km^{2} (3,300 sq mi)
  - Metro: 13,452 km^{2} (5,194 sq mi)

Population
  - Urban: 38,140,000

GDP (nominal, 2022)
  - Metro: US$1.766 trillion
  - Per capita: US$39,831

The Greater Tokyo Area is the third most populous metropolitan area in the world, consisting of the Kantō region of Japan (including Tokyo Metropolis and the prefectures of Chiba, Gunma, Ibaraki, Kanagawa, Saitama, and Tochigi) as well as the prefecture of Yamanashi of the neighboring Chūbu region. In Japanese, it is referred to by various terms, one of the most common being Capital Region (首都圏, Shuto-ken).

As of 2026, the United Nations estimates the total population at 36,954,512, making it the third-most populous urban area in the world. It is the second-largest single metropolitan area in the world in terms of built-up or urban function landmass at 8,547 square kilometres (3,300 sq mi), behind only the New York City metropolitan area at 4,495 square miles (11,640 km^{2}). With around US$1.8 trillion in GDP, Tokyo remains the second-largest metropolitan economy in the world, also behind New York. According to the WIPO Innovation Cluster Rating 2025, the region is one of the three leading science and technology clusters in the world.

== Definition ==
Growth of densely inhabited districts (DIDs, defined as >4,000 people/km^{2} or >10,355 people/mi^{2}) of suburb Saitama city (outlined) of northern Greater Tokyo, 1960s to 2010. Notice how the densely populated zones grow along railway lines and stations, the purple circles and lines. Green southern border is Tokyo.

There are various definitions of the Greater Tokyo Area, each of which tries to incorporate different aspects. Some definitions are clearly defined by law or government regulation, some are based coarsely on administrative areas, while others are for research purposes such as commuting patterns or distance from Central Tokyo. Each definition has a different population figure, granularity, methodology, and spatial association.

=== Various definitions of Tokyo, Greater Tokyo, and Kantō ===
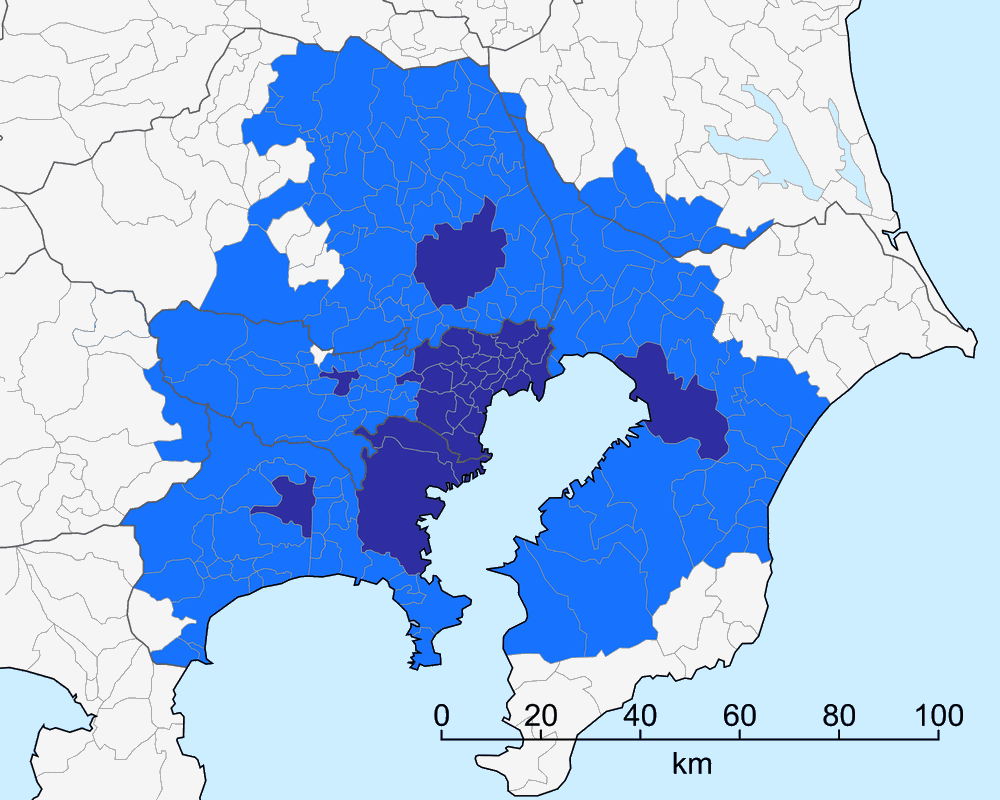
A map of Tokyo MEA in 2015

Inner Tokyo and Tokyo	Details	Population, thousands (year)	Area (km^{2})	Population density (people/km^{2})	Map
Area of former (dissolved) Tokyo City limits	23 special wards, does not correspond to any single authority	8,841 (1970CF), 8,135 (2000CF), 8,490 (2005CF), 8,949 (2010CF), 9,256 (2015-12CR)	621.9	13,080 (2000); 14,390 (2010); 14,883 (2015–12)	
Tokyo Metropolis	Prefectural-level jurisdiction (Tokyo-to), figures excluding the Izu and Ogasawara islands	12,038 (2000CF), 12,541 (2005CF), 13,129 (2010CF), 13,479 (2015-12CR)	1808	6,658(2000); 6,936 (2005); 7,216.5 (2010); 7,455 (2015–12)	

Metropolitan area	Details	Population, thousands (year)	Area (km^{2})	Population density (people/km^{2})	Map
Tokyo Metropolitan Employment Area (東京大都市雇用圏, Tōkyō Dai-toshi Koyō-ken)	All municipalities that have at least 10% of their population commuting to the 23 special wards. Figures for this definition are complex to update without a major re-study.	27,106 (1980); 29,958 (1990); 31,730 (2000); 34,834 (2010); 35,304 (2015)	9,036.67 (1998); 10,403.76 (2010)	3,348.2 (2010)	
One Metropolis, Three Prefectures (一都三県, Itto Sanken)	Coarse administrative definition that contains Tokyo, Kanagawa, Saitama, and Chiba prefectures. Misses many of the more-distant suburbs that lie outside the prefectural borders, especially in Ibaraki and Gunma. Incorporates sparsely settled rural districts like Nishitama.	33,534 (2000CF), 35,623 (2010CF), 36,092 (2015-12CR)	13,555.65	2,627.9 (2010), 2,662 (2015–12)	
Kantō Major Metropolitan Area (関東大都市圏, Kantō Dai-toshi-ken)	One of the two definitions the Japan Statistics Bureau uses. Consists of all municipalities that have at least 1.5% of their population aged 15 and above commuting to a designated city (Chiba, Kawasaki, Sagamihara, Saitama, and Yokohama) or the 23 special wards. Before Saitama became a designated city in 2001, the area was called Keihin'yō Major Metropolitan Area (京浜葉大都市圏, Keihin'yō Dai-toshi-ken). Excludes adjacent metropolitan areas of Gunma, Ibaraki, and Utsunomiya which are urbanized but have some small towns in between them and Tokyo. Most locally detailed definition, but hard to update without major re-study.	36,923 (2010)	–	–	
Tokyo Major Metropolitan Area (東京大都市圏, Tōkyō Dai-toshi-ken)	Set of municipalities that are completely or mostly within 50 and 70 kilometres of the Tokyo Metropolitan Government Buildings in Shinjuku. Suburbs tend to extend finger-like along major commuter train routes and density builds along express stops, not in a uniform fashion, and so this definition is of value.	32,714 (<50 km, 2010), 36,303 (<70 km, 2010)	–	–	

Administrative area	Details	Population, thousands (year)	Area (km^{2})	Population density (people/km^{2})	Map
Kantō region	Entire national region, includes many rural areas	40,550 (2000CF); 42,607 (2010CF); 42,945 (2015-12CR); 42,995 (2020CF)	32,423.9	1,314.1 (2010)	
National Capital Region	According to the National Capital Region Planning Act, very coarse administrative zone, essentially Kantō plus Yamanashi, includes large rural areas.	41,438 (2000CF); 43,470 (2010CF); 43,785 (2015-12CR); 43,830(2020CF)	36,889.28	1,178.4 (2010)	

Notes and sources: All figures issued by Japan Statistics Bureau, except for Metro Employment Area, a study by Center for Spatial Information Service, the University of Tokyo. Abbreviations: CF for National Census Final Data (every 5 years by JSB), CR for Civil Registry (compiled by local governments, monthly as per legal requirement), CP for Census Preliminary.

=== National Capital Region ===
The National Capital Region (首都圏, Shutoken) of Japan refers to the Greater Tokyo Area as defined by the Metropolitan Area Readjustment Act (首都圏整備法, Shutoken-seibi-hō) of 1956, which defines it as "Tokyo and its surrounding area declared by government ordinance." The government ordinance defined it as Tokyo and all six prefectures in the Kantō region plus Yamanashi Prefecture. While this includes all of Greater Tokyo, it also includes sparsely populated mountain areas as well as the far-flung Bonin Islands which are administered under Tokyo.

=== International comparison ===
Using the "One Metropolis Three Prefectures" definition, Tokyo is 13,555.65 square kilometres (5,233.87 sq mi), a similar size to that of Los Angeles County, and almost two-thirds smaller than the combined statistical area of New York City, at 30,671 square kilometres (11,842 sq mi) and 21.9 million people. Other metropolitan areas such as Greater Jakarta are considerably more compact as well as more densely populated than Greater Tokyo.

=== Metropolitan Area definition ambiguities and issues ===
- The South Kantō region (南関東, Minami Kantō) is a potentially ambiguous term. Informally, it may mean the One Metropolis, Two Prefectures, or the area without Saitama Prefecture. Formally, it may mean the South Kantō Block, which is not the Greater Tokyo Area, but a proportional representation block of the national election, comprising Kanagawa, Chiba, and Yamanashi Prefectures.
- In informal occasions, the term National Capital Region (首都圏, Shuto-ken) often means Greater Tokyo Area. Officially, the term refers to a much larger area, namely the whole Kantō region and Yamanashi Prefecture.
- Tokyo as a metropolis includes some 394 km^{2} of islands (the Izu and Ogasawara islands), as well as some mountainous areas to the far west (331 km^{2}), which are officially part of Greater Tokyo, but are wilderness or rustic areas.

== Cities ==
(populations listed for those over 300,000)

=== Cities within Tokyo ===
Tokyo is legally classified as a to (都), which translates as "metropolis", and is treated as one of the forty-seven prefectures of Japan. The metropolis is administered by the Tokyo Metropolitan Government as a whole.

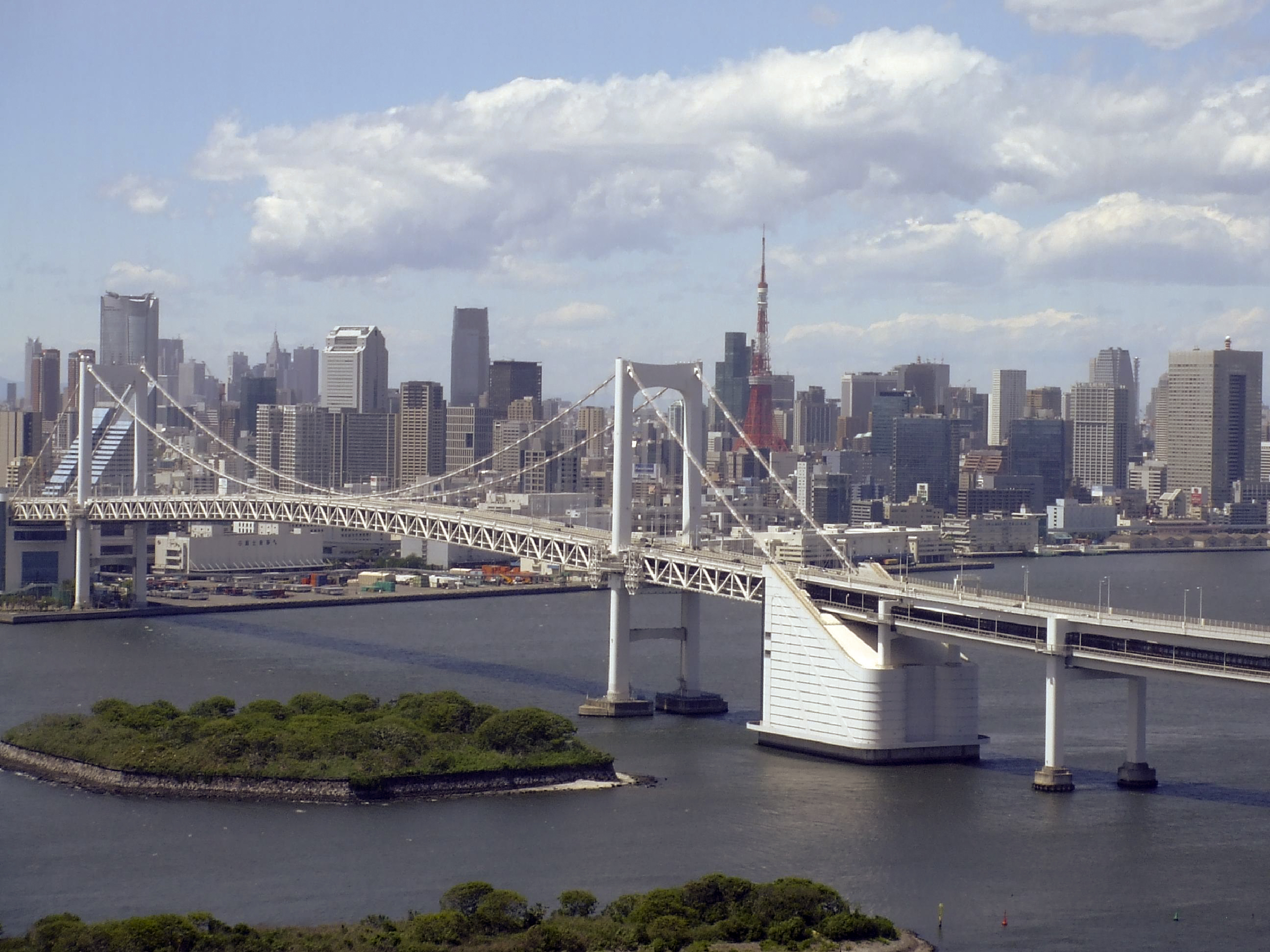
Special wards of Tokyo

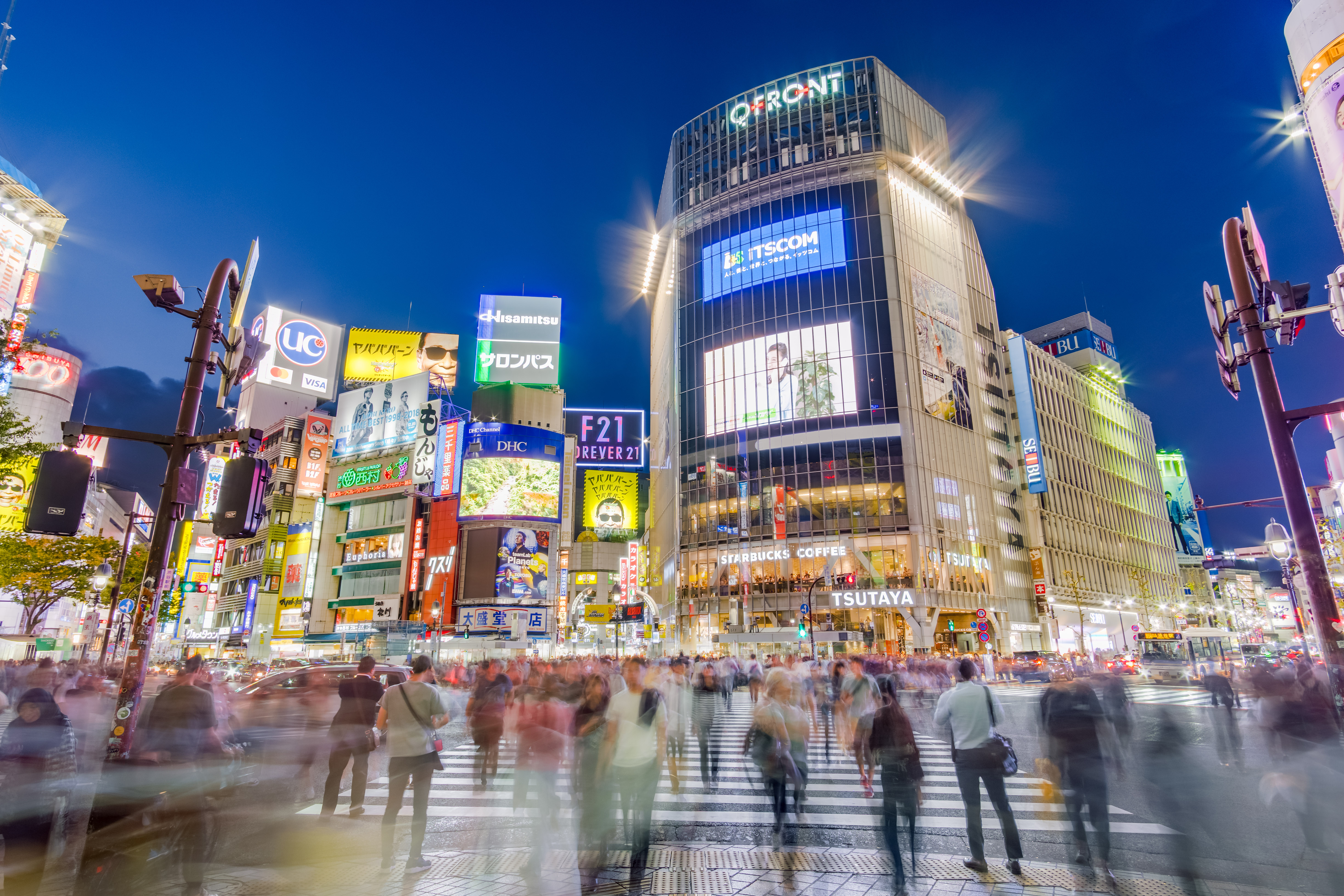
Shibuya

==== Eastern Tokyo Metropolis ====
Central Tokyo, situated in the eastern portion of Tokyo Metropolis, was once incorporated as Tokyo City, which was dismantled during World War II. Its subdivisions have been reclassified as special wards (特別区, tokubetsu-ku). The twenty three special wards currently have the legal status of cities, with individual mayors and city councils, and they call themselves "cities" in English. However, when listing Japan's largest cities, Tokyo's twenty three wards are often counted as a single city.

==== Western Tokyo Metropolis ====
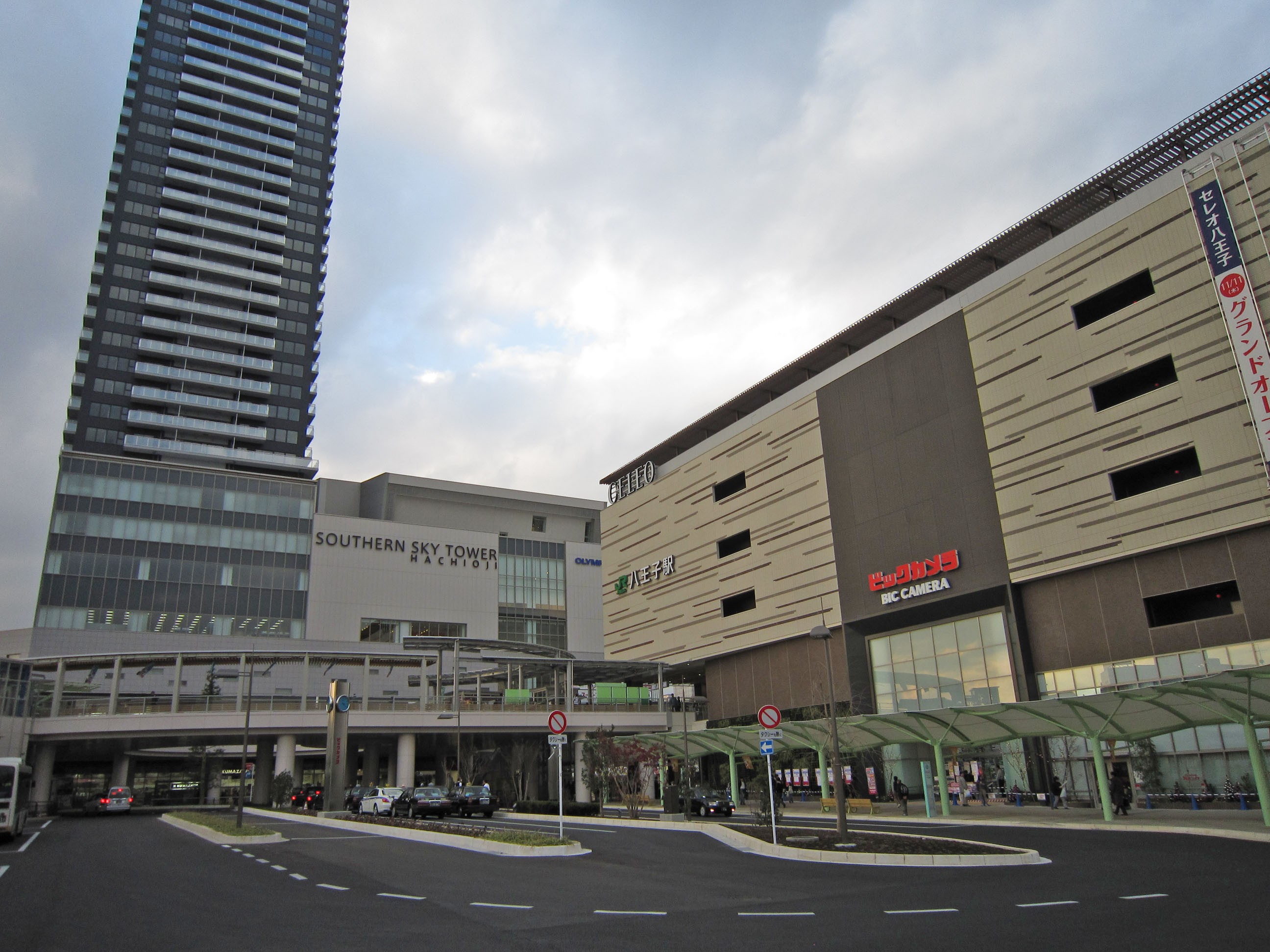
Hachiōji

Western Tokyo, known as the Tama Area (Tama-chiiki 多摩地域) comprises a number of municipalities, including these suburban cities:

- Akiruno
- Akishima
- Chōfu
- Fuchū
- Fussa
- Hachiōji (pop 540,000)
- Hamura
- Higashikurume
- Higashimurayama
- Higashiyamato
- Hino
- Inagi
- Kiyose
- Kodaira
- Koganei
- Kokubunji
- Komae
- Kunitachi
- Machida (pop over 410,000)
- Mitaka
- Musashimurayama
- Musashino
- Nishitōkyō
- Ōme
- Tachikawa
- Tama

=== Cities outside Tokyo ===
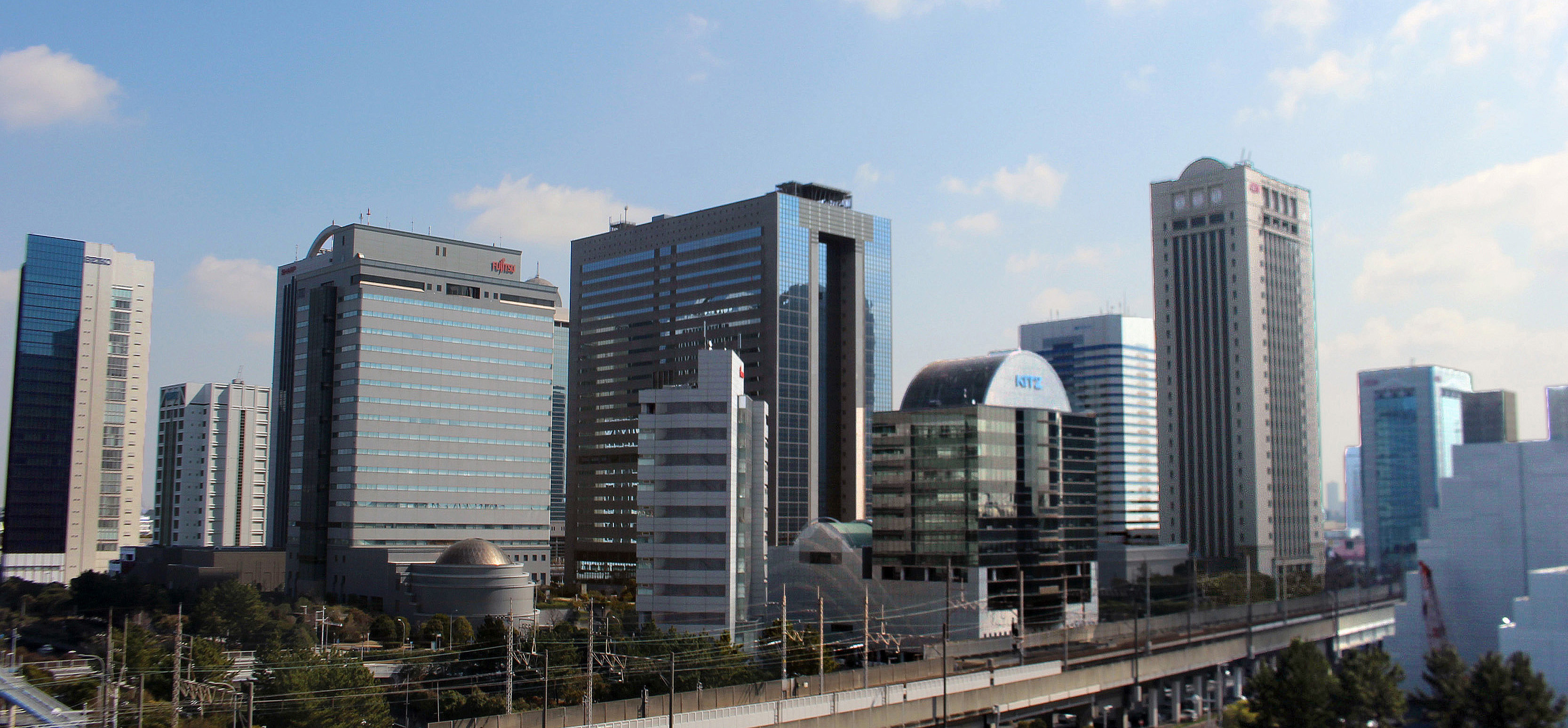
Chiba

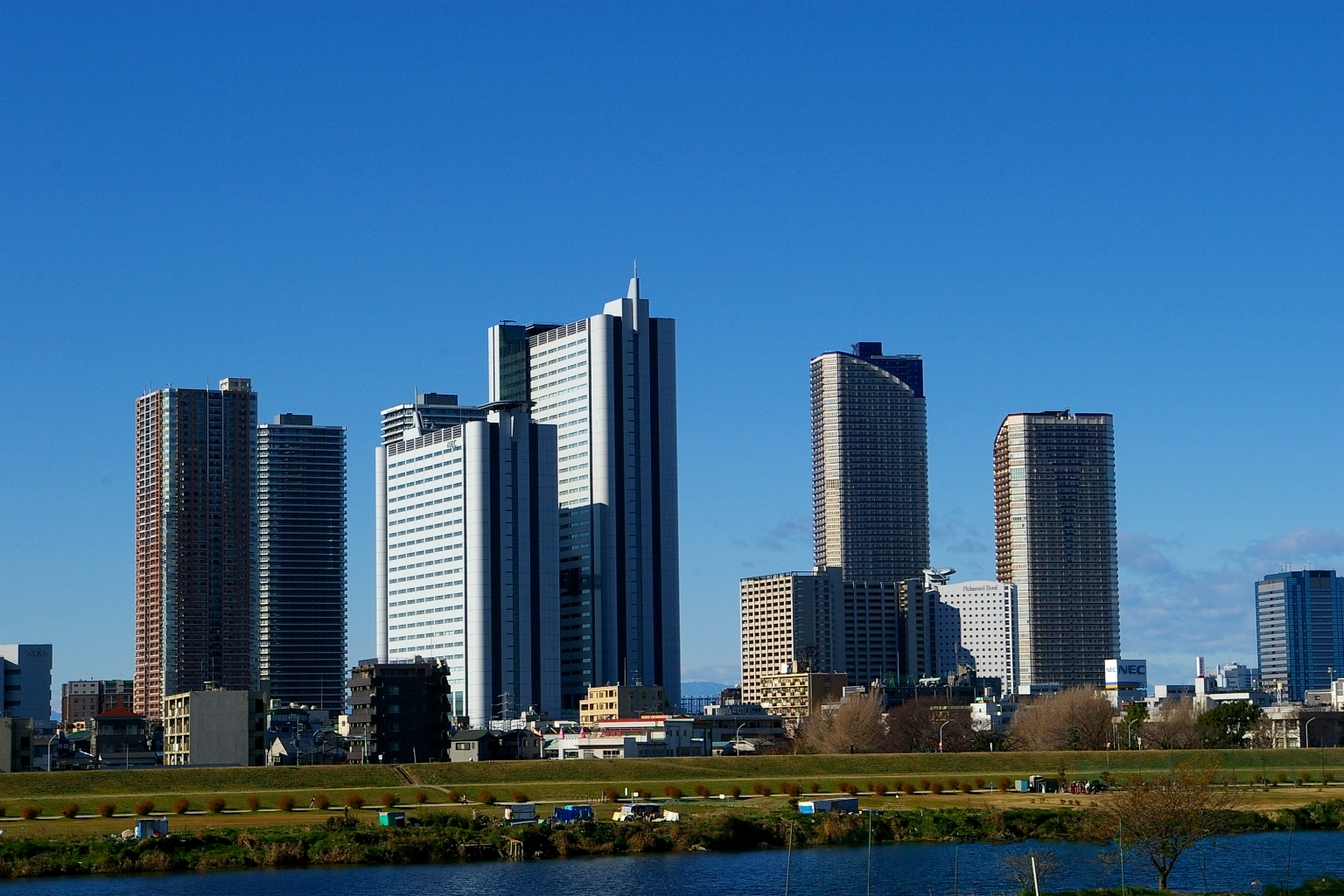
Kawasaki

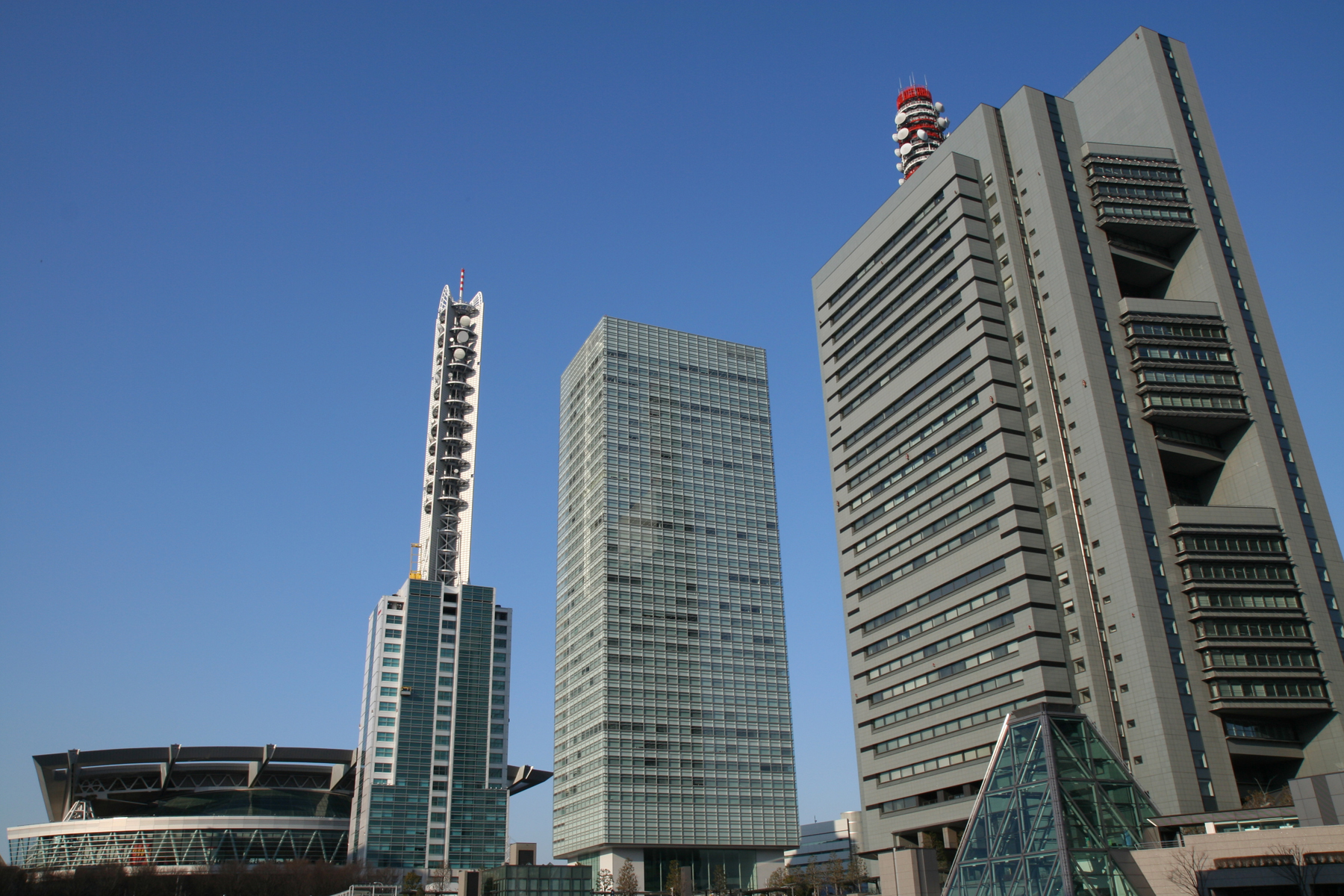
Saitama

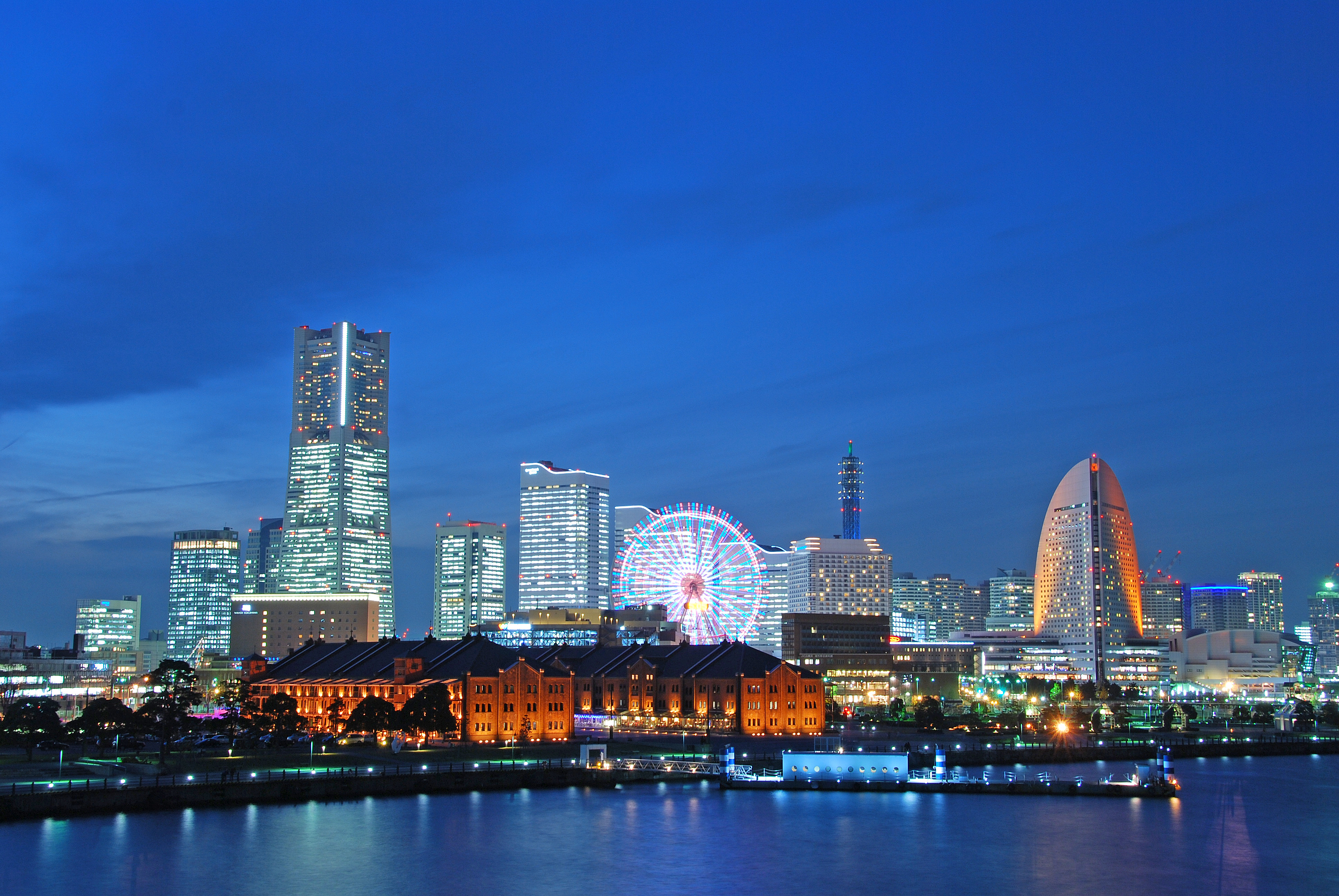
Yokohama

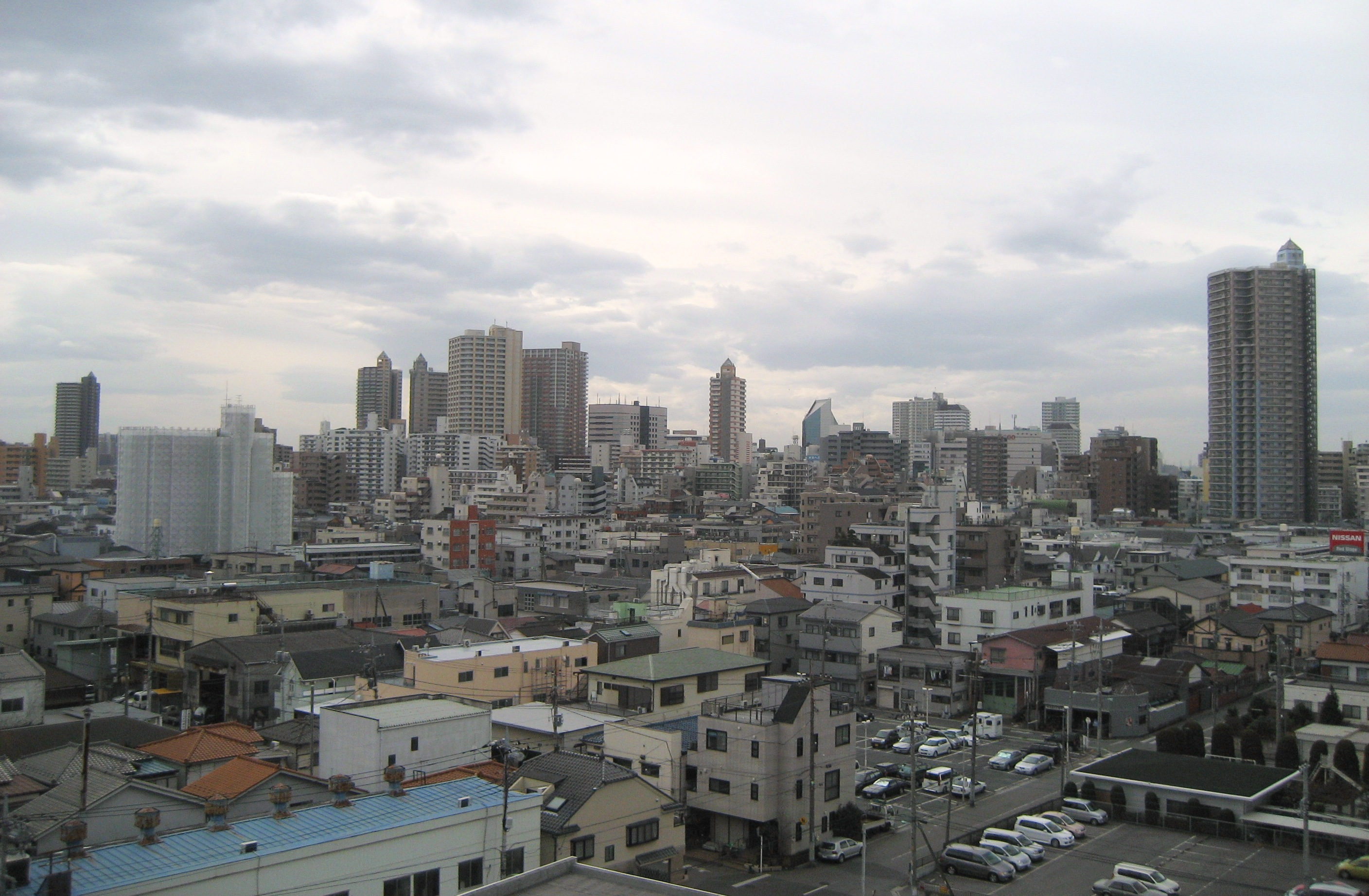
Kawaguchi

The core cities of the Greater Tokyo Area outside Tokyo Metropolis are:

- Chiba (population 940,000)
- Kawasaki (population 1.36 million)
- Sagamihara (population 730,000)
- Saitama (population 1.19 million)
- Yokohama (population 3.62 million)

The other cities in Chiba, Kanagawa and Saitama Prefectures are:

- Abiko
- Ageo
- Asahi
- Asaka
- Atsugi
- Ayase
- Chichibu
- Chigasaki
- Chōshi
- Ebina
- Fujimi
- Fujimino
- Fujisawa (pop 416,000)
- Fukaya
- Funabashi (pop 580,000)
- Futtsu
- Gyōda
- Hadano
- Hannō
- Hanyū
- Hasuda
- Hidaka
- Higashimatsuyama
- Hiratsuka
- Honjō
- Ichihara
- Ichikawa (pop. 470,000)
- Inzai
- Iruma
- Isehara
- Kamagaya
- Kamakura
- Kamogawa
- Kashiwa (pop 380,000)
- Kasukabe
- Katsuura
- Kawagoe (pop 353,214)
- Kawaguchi (pop 595,011)
- Kazo
- Kimitsu
- Kisarazu
- Kitamoto
- Koshigaya (population 318,000)
- Kōnosu
- Kuki
- Kumagaya
- Matsudo (pop 480,000)
- Minamiashigara
- Misato
- Miura
- Mobara
- Nagareyama
- Narashino
- Narita
- Niiza
- Noda
- Ōamishirasato
- Odawara
- Okegawa
- Sakado
- Sakura
- Satte
- Sawara
- Sayama
- Shiki
- Shiraoka
- Shiroi
- Sodegaura
- Sōka
- Tateyama
- Toda
- Tōgane
- Tokorozawa (pop 338,000)
- Tomisato
- Tsurugashima
- Urayasu
- Wakō
- Warabi
- Yachimata
- Yachiyo
- Yamato
- Yashio
- Yōkaichiba
- Yokosuka (pop 420,000)
- Yoshikawa
- Yotsukaidō
- Zama
- Zushi

source: stat.go.jp census 2005

=== Additional cities ===
In the major metropolitan area (MMA) definition used by the Japanese Statistics Bureau, the following cities in Ibaraki, Tochigi, Gunma, Yamanashi, and Shizuoka Prefectures are included:

==== Gunma Prefecture ====
- Tatebayashi
- Ota

==== Ibaraki Prefecture ====
- Inashiki
- Ishioka
- Jōsō
- Kasumigaura
- Koga
- Moriya
- Ryūgasaki
- Toride
- Tsuchiura
- Tsukuba
- Tsukubamirai
- Ushiku

==== Shizuoka Prefecture ====
- Atami

==== Tochigi Prefecture ====
- Oyama

==== Yamanashi Prefecture ====
- Ōtsuki
- Uenohara

==== Border areas ====
Tighter definitions for Greater Tokyo do not include adjacent metropolitan areas of Numazu-Mishima (approx. 450,000) to the southwest, Maebashi-Takasaki-Ōta-Ashikaga (approx. 1,500,000 people) on the northwest, and Greater Utsunomiya (approx. 1,000,000) to the north. If they are included, Greater Tokyo's population would be around 39 million. Takasaki-Maebashi is included as part of the Tokyo-Yokohama area in the definition of urban areas by Demographia.

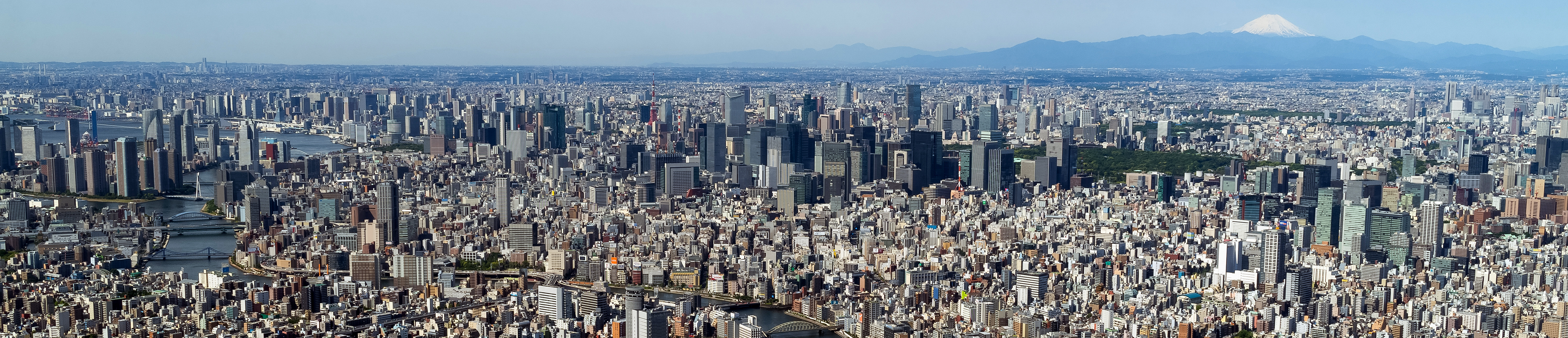
Panoramic view of Tokyo from Tokyo Skytree

== Geography ==
At the center of the main urban area (approximately the first 10 kilometres (6.2 mi) from Tokyo Station) are the 23 special wards, formerly treated as a single city but now governed as separate municipalities, and containing many major commercial centers such as Shinjuku, Shibuya, Ikebukuro and Ginza. Around the 23 special wards are a multitude of suburban cities which merge seamlessly into each other to form a continuous built up area, circumnavigated by the heavily travelled Route 16 which forms a (broken) loop about 40 kilometres (25 mi) from central Tokyo. Situated along the loop are the major cities of Yokohama (to the south of Tokyo), Hachiōji (to the west), Ōmiya (now part of Saitama City, to the north), and Chiba (to the east).

Within the Route 16 loop, the coastline of Tokyo Bay is heavily industrialised, with the Keihin Industrial Area stretching from Tokyo down to Yokohama, and the Keiyō Industrial Zone from Tokyo eastwards to Chiba. Along the periphery of the main urban area are numerous new suburban housing developments such as the Tama New Town. The landscape is relatively flat compared to most of Japan, most of it comprising low hills.

Outside the Route 16 loop the landscape becomes more rural. To the southwest is an area known as Shōnan, which contains various cities and towns along the coast of Sagami Bay, and to the west the area is mountainous.

Many rivers run through the area, the major ones being Arakawa and Tama River.

== Demographics ==
Population of South-Kanto Prefectures (Tokyo, Kanagawa, Chiba, Saitama)

Historical population
Year	Pop.	±% p.a.
1950	11,274,641	—
1955	13,712,679	+3.99%
1960	16,678,821	+3.99%
1965	20,284,371	+3.99%
1970	23,297,503	+2.81%
1975	26,614,733	+2.70%
1980	28,548,512	+1.41%
1985	30,303,794	+1.20%
1990	32,530,003	+1.43%
1995	33,586,573	+0.64%
2000	34,607,069	+0.60%
2005	35,682,460	+0.61%
2010	36,923,193	+0.69%
2015	37,273,866	+0.19%
2020	38,034,418	+0.40%
for Kanto MMA:

== Economy ==
Tokyo metropolitan area is the second largest metropolitan economy in the world only behind New York.

Prefecture	GDP (in billion JP¥, 2022)	GDP (in billion US$, 2022)	Population (2022)	GDP per capita (US$, 2022)
Tokyo	120,220	888	14,038,167	63,256
Kanagawa	35,159	260	9,232,489	28,161
Saitama	24,666	182	7,337,089	24,805
Chiba	21,414	158	6,265,975	25,216
Ibaraki	14,586	108	2,839,555	38,034
Gunma	9,762	72	1,913,254	37,632
Tochigi	9,596	71	1,908,821	37,196
Yamanashi	3,715	27	801,874	33,671
National Capital Region	239,118	1,766	44,337,224	39,831

=== Metropolitan Employment Area ===
Year	2010	1995	1980
Employed persons 000s	16,234	16,381	12,760
Production (billion US$)	1,797	1,491	358
Production manufacturing (billion US$)	216	476	159
Private capital stock (billion US$)	3,618	2,631	368
Social overhead capital (billion US$)	1,607	1,417	310
1 US dollar (Japanese yen)	87.780	94.060	226.741

Sources: Conversion rates – Exchange rates – OECD Data

== Transportation ==
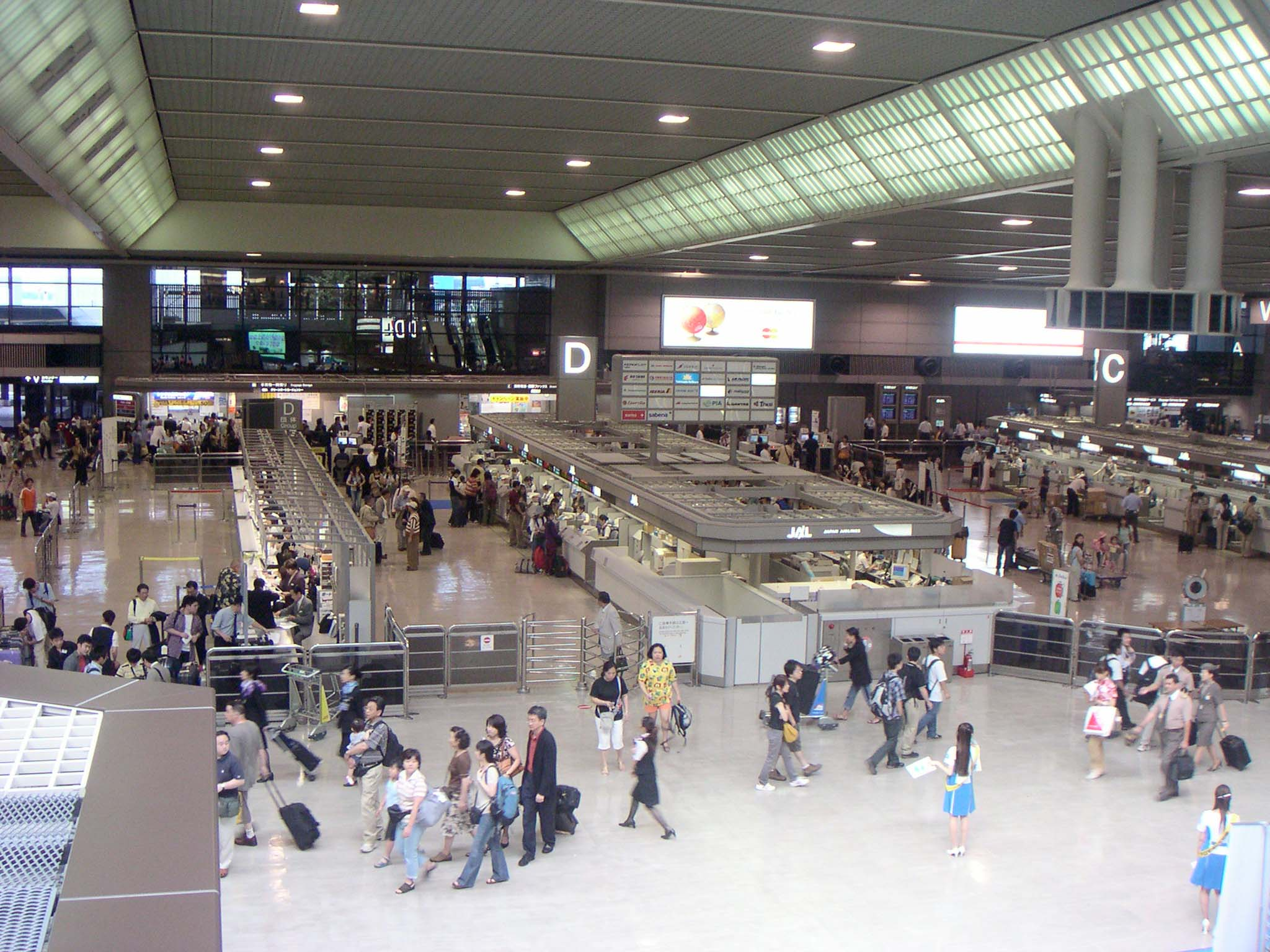
Narita International Airport

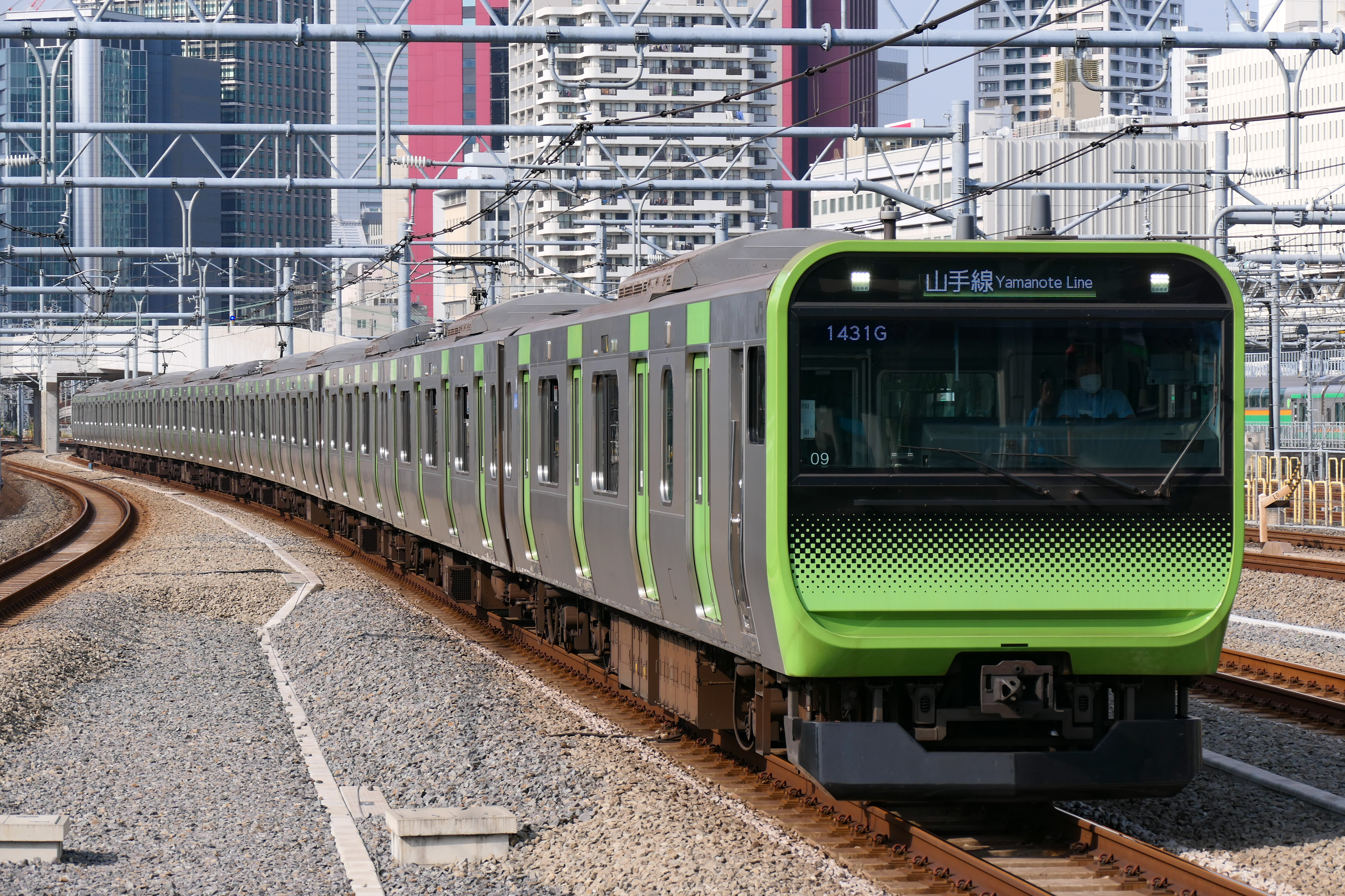
Yamanote Line; 3.61 million passengers ride per day.

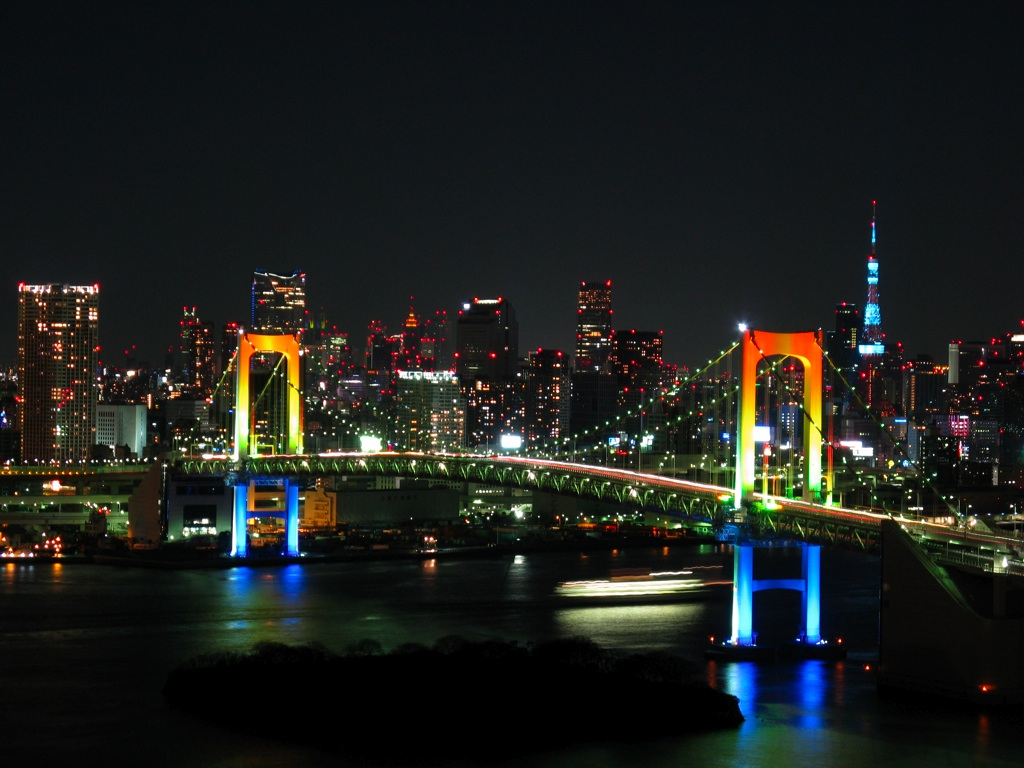
Shuto Expressway on Rainbow Bridge

=== Air ===
The Greater Tokyo Area has two major airports, Tokyo International Airport, commonly known as Haneda Airport (once chiefly domestic, now turning international) and Narita International Airport (chiefly international as well). Minor facilities include Chōfu and Ibaraki Airport. Tokyo Heliport serves helicopter traffic, including police, fire, and news. Japan Civil Aviation Bureau handles air traffic in large part but various military facilities handle air traffic in part: Hyakuri Air Base (Japan Air Self-Defense Force), Utsunomiya Air Field (Japan Ground Self-Defense Force), and Yokota Air Base (United States Air Force).

=== Rail ===
Greater Tokyo has an extensive railway network comprising high-speed rail, commuter rails, subways, monorails, private lines, trams and others. There are around 136 individual rail lines in the Greater Tokyo Area, and between 1,000 and 1,200 railway stations depending on one's definition of the area, most designed for heavy use, usually long enough to accommodate 10-car (200 metres (660 ft) long) trains. Stations are designed to accommodate hundreds of thousands of passengers at any given time, with miles of connecting tunnels linking vast department stores and corporate offices. Tokyo Station has underground connections that stretch well over 4 kilometres (2.5 mi), and Shinjuku Station has well over 200 exits. Greater Tokyo's Railway Network is easily considered the world's largest in terms of both daily passenger throughput with a daily trips of over 40 million (20 million different passengers) as well as physical extent with approximately 2,578 kilometres (1,602 mi) of track. Shinjuku station is used by an average of 3.34 million people per day, making it the world's busiest train station. Some 57 percent of all Greater Tokyo residents used rail as their primary means of transport in 2001.

JR East and many other carriers crisscross the region with a network of rail lines. The most important carriers include Keihin Kyūkō Electric Railway (Keikyū), Keisei Electric Railway, Keiō Electric Railway, Odakyū Electric Railway, Seibu Railway, Tōbu Railway, and Tōkyū Corporation. In addition to Tokyo's two subway systems — Tokyo Metro and Tokyo Metropolitan Bureau of Transportation (Toei and Toden lines), Yokohama also has two subway lines.

The Tokyo Monorail provides an important shuttle service between Haneda Airport and Hamamatsucho station on the Yamanote line.

=== Others ===
The Shuto Expressway system connects to other national expressways in the capital region.

Tokyo and Yokohama are major commercial seaports, and both the Japan Maritime Self-Defense Force and United States Navy maintain naval bases at Yokosuka.

== See also ==
- Jing-Jin-Ji
- List of metropolitan areas in Asia
- List of metropolitan areas by GDP over US$ 100 billion
- List of metropolitan areas in Japan
- National Capital Region, briefly shows the two definitions of the "Capital Area" (Shuto-ken)
- Seoul Capital Area
