= Saint Petersburg metropolitan area =

Saint Petersburg metropolitan area Санкт-Петербургская агломерация
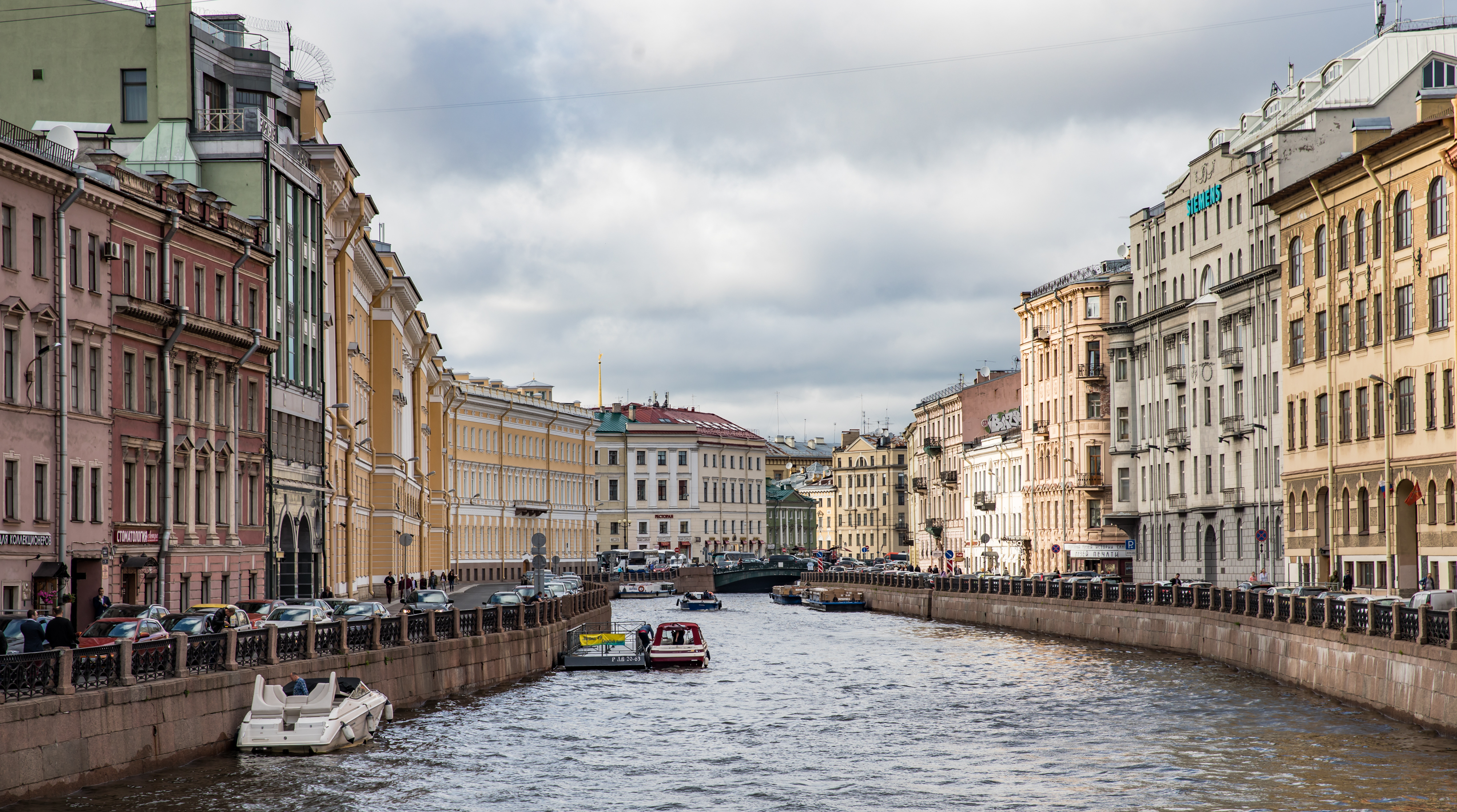
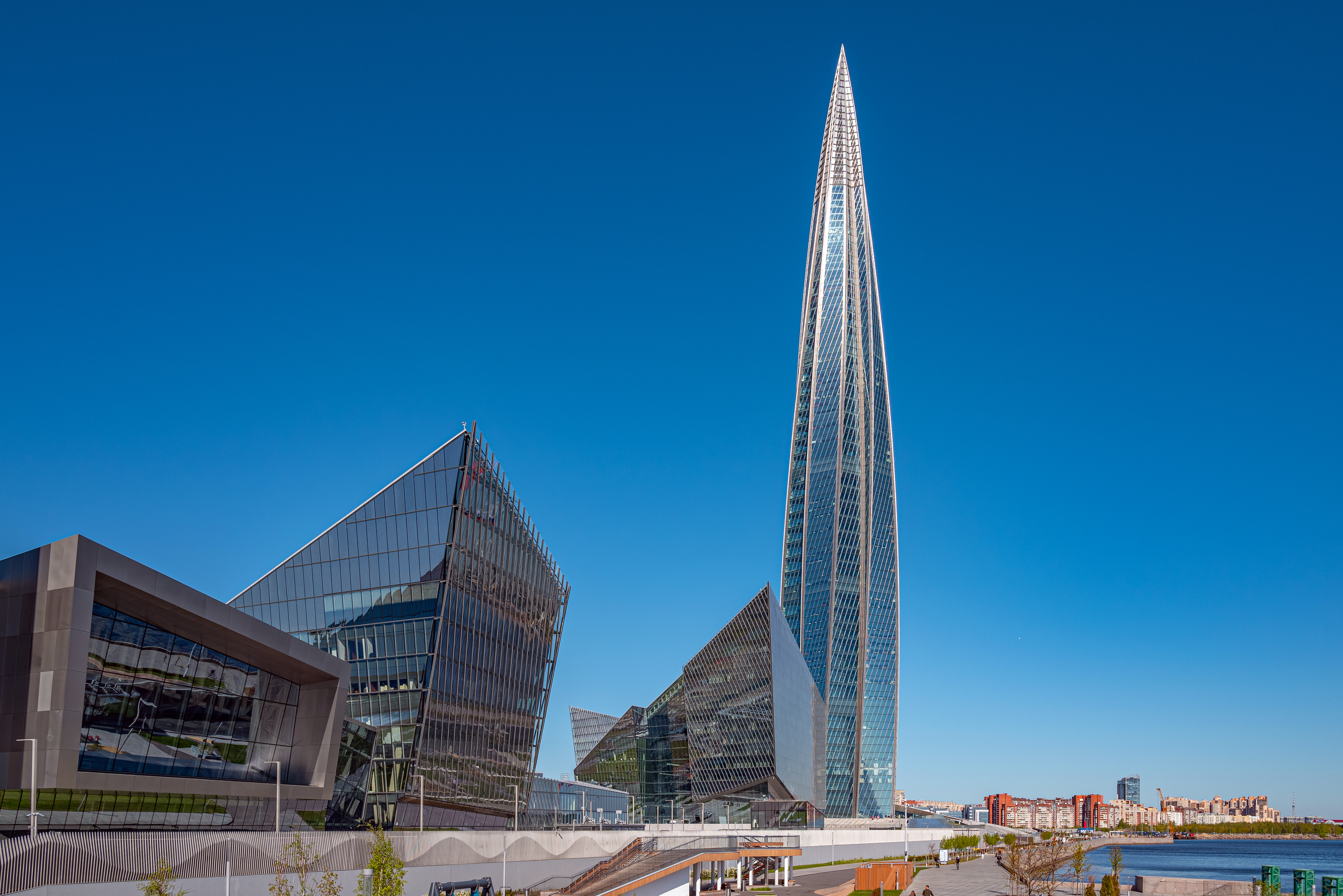
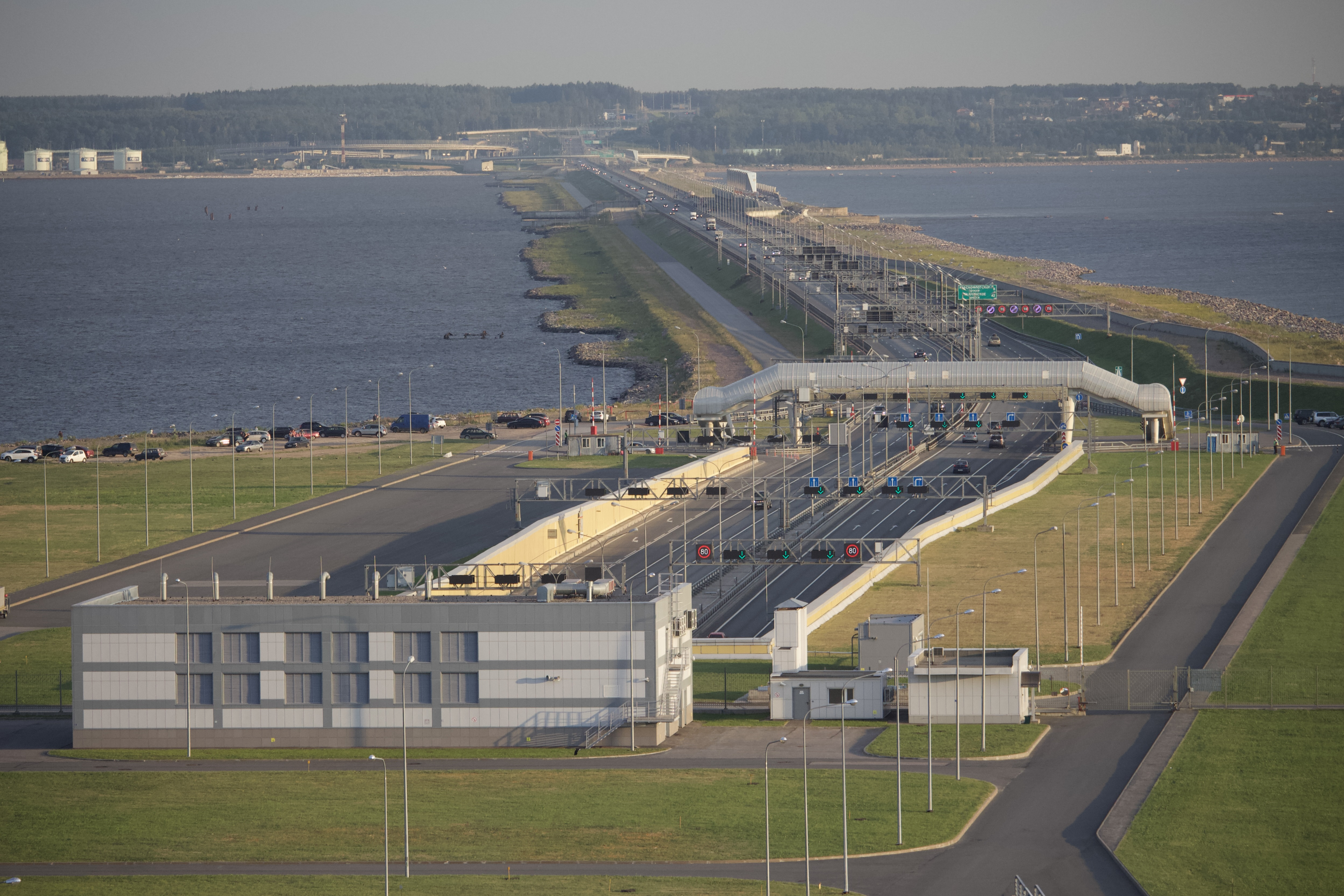
- From top, left to right: Moyka River from the Pevchesky Bridge to the Red Bridge; Lakhta Centre; Saint Petersburg Ring Road
- Interactive map of Saint Petersburg metropolitan area
- Coordinates: 59°56′N 30°19′E
- Country: Russia
- Major Cities: Saint Petersburg; Gatchina; Murino; Vsevolozhsk

Area
  - Metro: 11,600 km^{2} (4,500 sq mi)

Population
  - Metro: 6,421,000
  - Metro density: 554/km^{2} (1,430/sq mi)

GDP (nominal, 2023)
  - Metro: ₽ 10.908 trillion (US$ 128 billion)

The Saint Petersburg metropolitan area is a metropolitan area that is centered on Saint Petersburg. It includes the entire territory of the federal city of Saint Petersburg and part of the territory of Leningrad Oblast. The metropolitan area extends for about 50 km (31 mi) from the center of Saint Petersburg.

The population of the Saint Petersburg metropolitan area is approximately 6.4 million people of the urbanized population (including St. Petersburg, Vsevolozhsky, most of Gatchinsky and Lomonosovsky Districts, and part of Kirovsky and Tosnensky Districts of Leningrad Oblast), and the remaining parts of the above municipal districts of Leningrad Oblast, including the Sosnovy Bor, whose area is approximately 12.6 thousand km². It is the second largest metropolitan area in Russia after Moscow.
