= Moscow metropolitan area =

Metropolitan area in Russia

Coordinates: 55.6667°N 37.5°E

Moscow metropolitan area Московская агломерация (Russian)
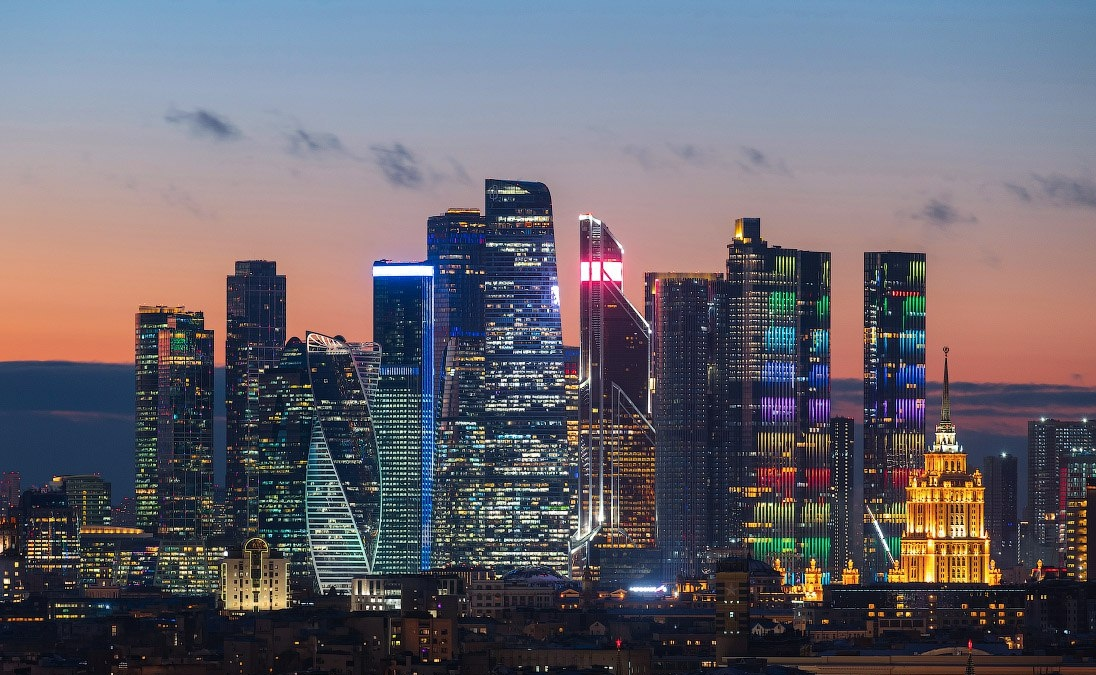
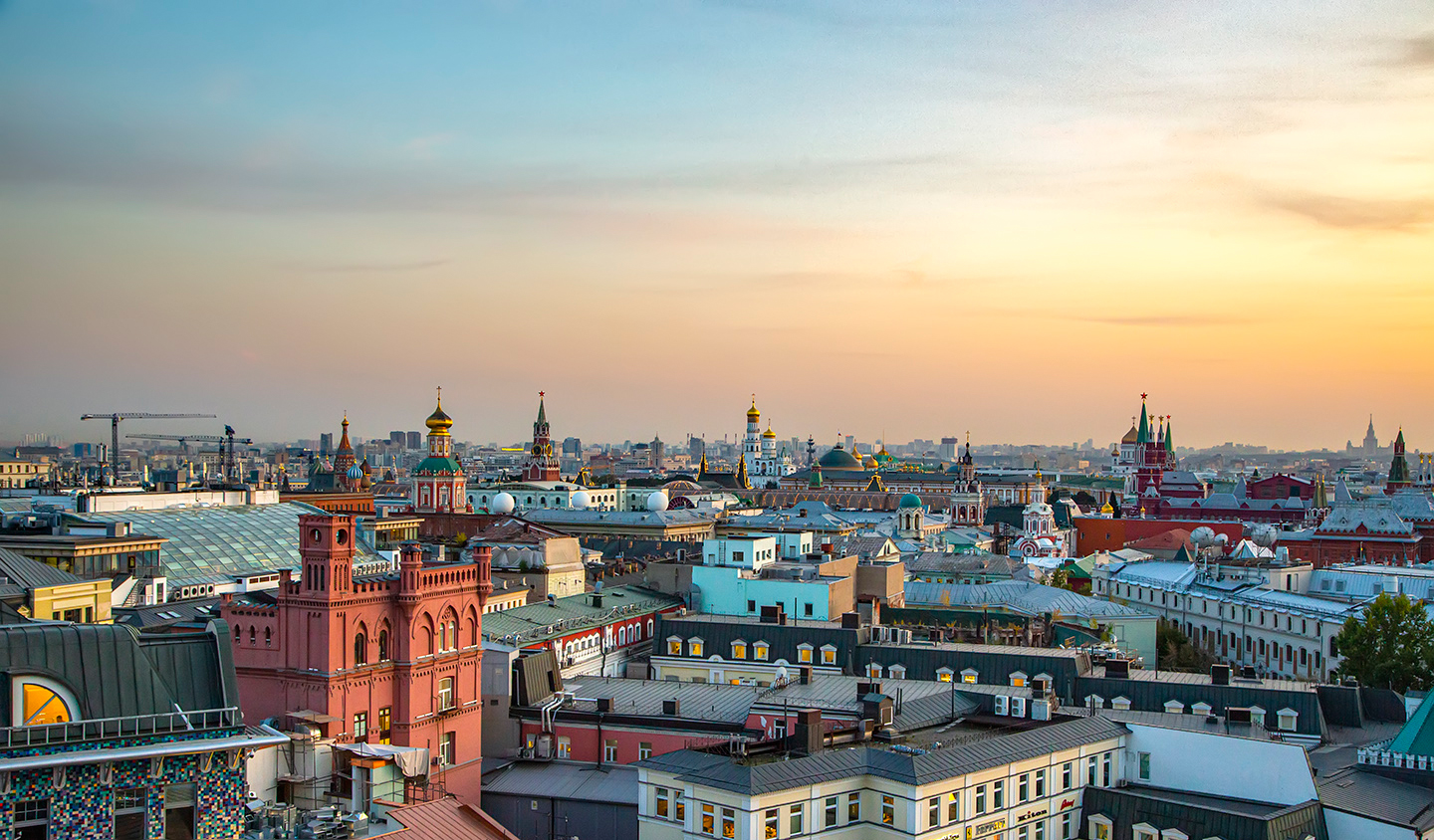
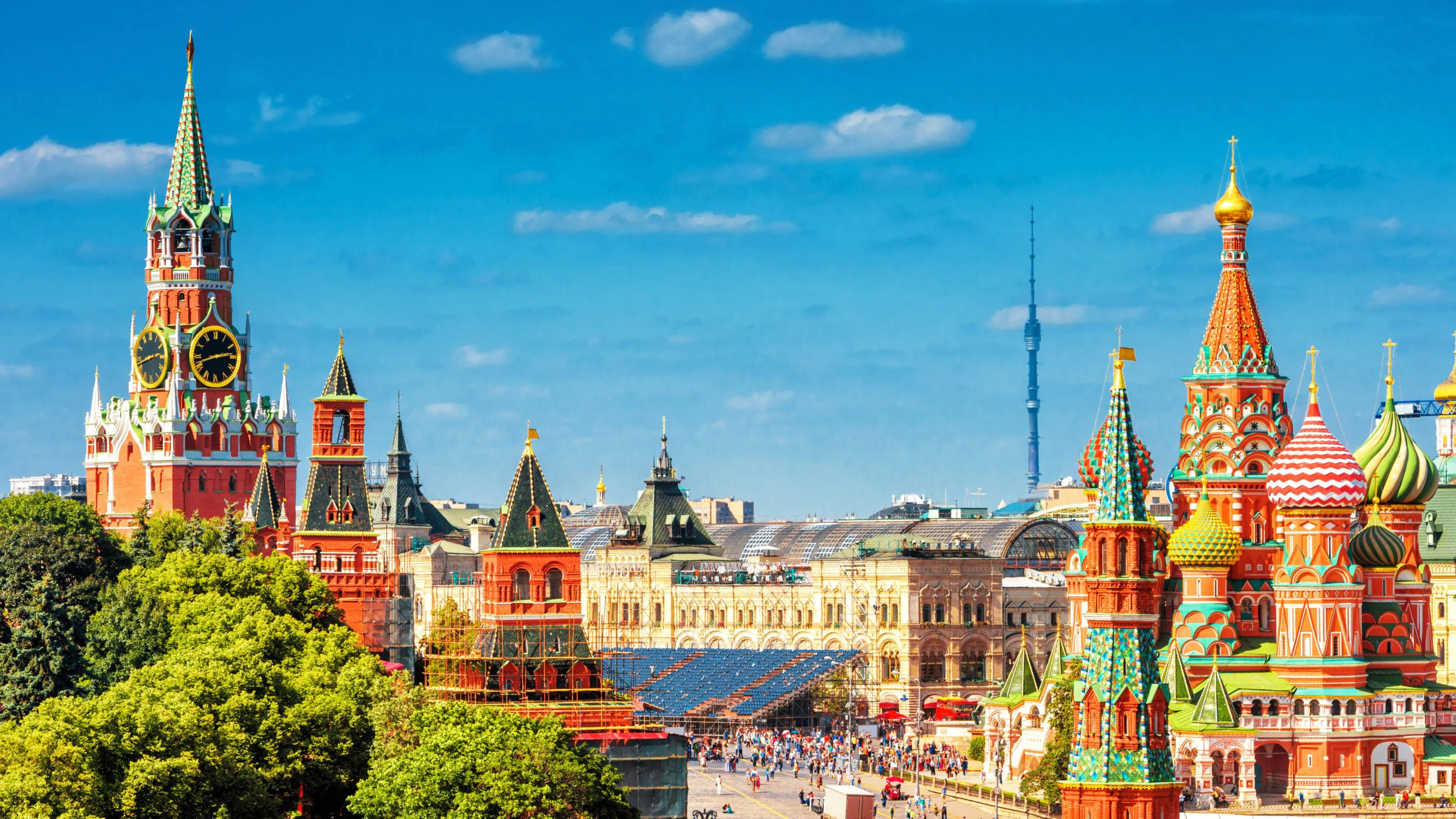
- From top, left to right: Moscow International Business Center; Moscow panorama; Red Square

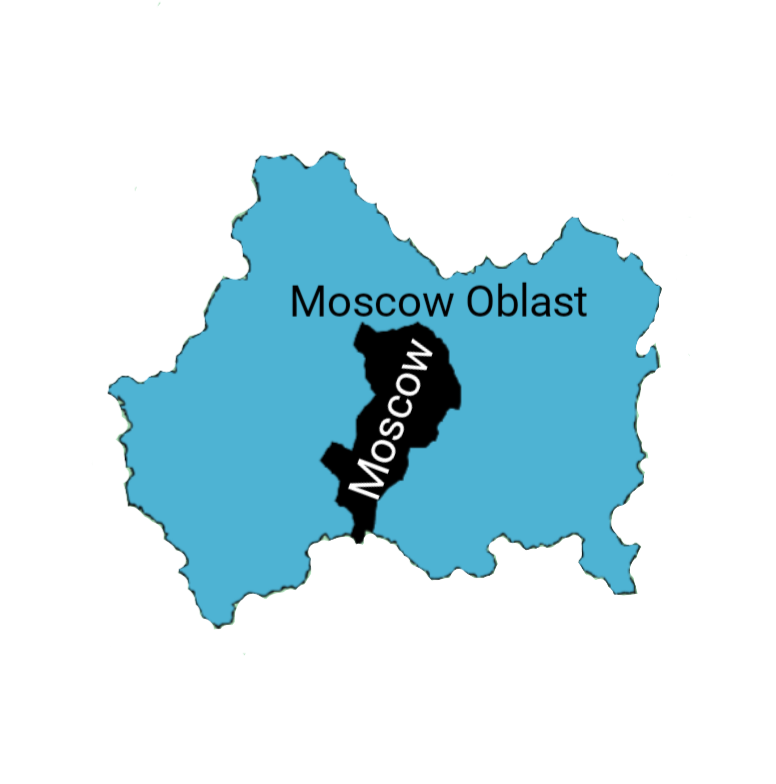
- Federal city of Moscow - black, Moscow Oblast - light blue
- Country: Russia
- Federal subject: Moscow; Moscow Oblast
- Largest city: Moscow (13,010,112)

Area
  - Metro: 48,360 km^{2} (18,670 sq mi)

Population (2023)
  - Metro: 21,700,000
  - Metro density: 449/km^{2} (1,160/sq mi)

GDP (Nominal, 2024)
  - Metro: ₽51.89 trillion (US$704.51 billion)
  - Per capita: ₽2.41 million (US$32,714.88)
- Time zone: UTC+3 (UTC)

The Moscow metropolitan area (Russian: Московская агломерация, romanized: Moskovskaya aglomeratsiya) or Moscow capital region (Russian: Московский столичный регион, romanized: Moskovskiy stolichnyy region) is the most populous metropolitan area in Russia and Europe, with a population of around 21.5 million. It consists of the city of Moscow and surrounding areas in Moscow Oblast.

The related term Moscow region (Московский регион) is used unofficially to describe Moscow and Moscow Oblast together. However, formally, they are two separate federal subjects.

== Structure and population estimation ==
Subdivision	Area km^{2}	Population	GDP (2024)	GDP per capita (2024)
Moscow	2562	13,010,112	₽41 trillion (US$556.74 billion)	₽3.1 million (US$42,138.55)
Moscow Oblast	44300	8,524,665	₽10.88 trillion (US$147.77 billion)	₽1.25 million (US$16,958.86)
Moscow metropolitan area	46862	21,534,777	₽51.89 trillion (US$704.51 billion)	₽2.41 million (US$32,714.88)

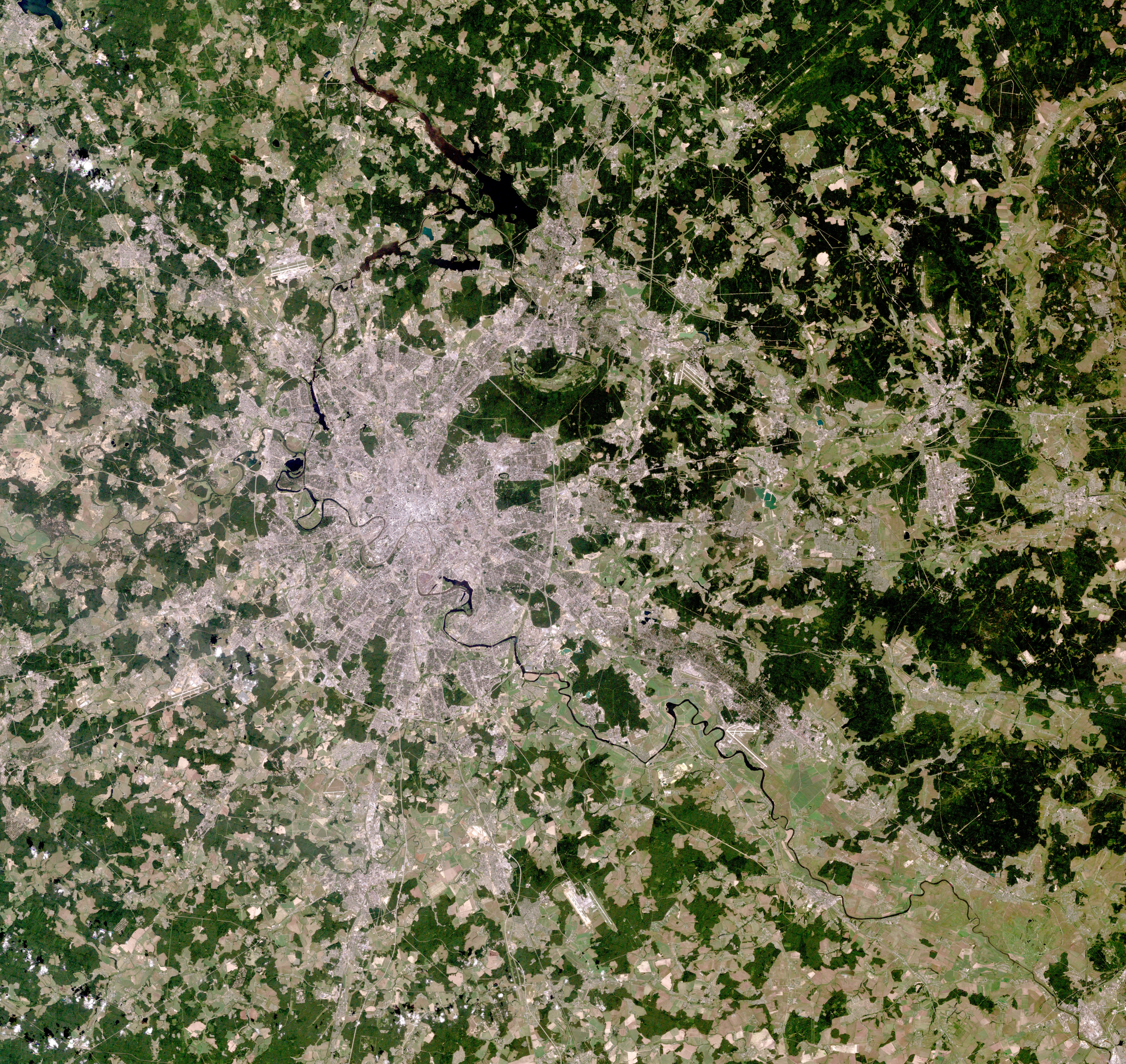
Moscow metropolitan area from space

The Moscow metropolitan area includes the city of Moscow, population 12,197,596, a ring of cities annexed to it and administered within (Balashikha, Korolyov, Krasnogorsk, Khimki, Mytishchi and Zelenograd), as well as large nearby towns with population of over 100,000 citizens (Reutov, Zheleznodorozhny, Podolsk and Lubertsy, to name a few) that fall under regional administration. Administratively, all those towns are a part of the Moscow Oblast. The metropolitan area has thus no coordinated administration structures, and no official population statistics.

Historical population
Year	Pop.	±%
1897	2,430,615	—
1926	6,590,336	+171.1%
1959	10,895,003	+65.3%
1970	12,716,490	+16.7%
1979	14,189,894	+11.6%
1989	15,660,955	+10.4%
2002	17,001,292	+8.6%
2010	18,598,621	+9.4%
2021	21,534,777	+15.8%
Source: Census data

The population of the Moscow region is the sum of populations of the city (13,010,112) and surrounding oblast (8,524,665), coming to 21,534,777 – about 14% of the entire Russian population.
