= Demographics of Mexico =

- Mexico's population pyramid in 2025
- Population: ▲131,946,900 (2025 est.)
- Density: 66.28/km^{2} (171.7/sq mi) (2024 est.)
- Growth rate: 0.7% (2024 est.)
- Birth rate: 12.1 births/1,000 population (2023 est.)
- Death rate: 6.2 deaths/1,000 population (2023 est.)
- Life expectancy: 74.6 years (2024 est.)
  - male: 71.6 years (2024 est.)
  - female: 77.7 years (2024 est.)
- Fertility rate: 1.23 children born/woman (2024 est.)
- Infant mortality: 12.1 deaths/1,000 live births (2024 est.)
- Net migration rate: −0.70 migrant(s)/1,000 population (2024 est.)
- Immigrant share: 1.3% (2024)

Age structure
- 0–14 years: 23.3% (male 15,647,805/ female 14,754,004) (2024 est.)
- 15–64 years: 68.6% (male 43,651,105/ female 45,983,174) (2024 est.)
- 65 and over: 8.2% (male 4,600,228/ female 6,103,611) (2024 est.)

Sex ratio
- Total: 0.96 male(s)/female (2024 est.)
- At birth: 1.05 male(s)/female
- Under 15: 1.06 male(s)/female
- 15–64 years: 0.95 male(s)/female
- 65 and over: 0.75 male(s)/female

Nationality
- Nationality: Mexican

Language
- Official: Spanish (99.4%) & 68 native languages
- Spoken: Languages of Mexico

With a population of about 129 million in 2022, Mexico is the 10th most populated country in the world. It is the largest Spanish-speaking country in the world and the third-most populous country in the Americas after the United States and Brazil. The most populous city in Mexico is the capital, Mexico City, with a population of 9.2 million. Its metropolitan area had 21.8 million in 2020. Approximately 53% of the population lives in one of the 48 large metropolitan areas in the country. In 2024, about 76% of the population of Mexico lived in urban areas and 23% lived in rural ones.

Demographic censuses are performed by the Instituto Nacional de Estadística y Geografía. The National Population Council (CONAPO) is an institution under the Ministry of Interior in charge of the analysis and research of population dynamics. The National Institute of Indigenous Peoples also undertakes research and analysis of the sociodemographic and linguistic indicators of the indigenous peoples. Throughout most of the 20th century Mexico's population was characterized by rapid growth. Although this tendency has been reversed and average annual population growth over the last five years was less than 1%, the demographic transition is still in progress; Mexico still has a large youth cohort.

== Demographic dynamics ==
Historical population of Mexico

Population growth, 1910 to 2015

Mexican states by population density, 2009

Historical population
Year	Pop.	±%
1500	12,000,000	—
1600	1,500,000	−87.5%
1700	4,000,000	+166.7%
1800	6,000,000	+50.0%
1832	7,000,000	+16.7%
1865	8,259,080	+18.0%
1895	12,700,294	+53.8%
1900	13,607,272	+7.1%
1910	15,160,369	+11.4%
1921	14,334,780	−5.4%
1930	16,552,722	+15.5%
1940	19,653,552	+18.7%
1950	25,791,017	+31.2%
1960	34,923,129	+35.4%
1970	48,225,238	+38.1%
1980	66,846,833	+38.6%
1990	81,249,645	+21.5%
2000	97,483,412	+20.0%
2010	112,336,538	+15.2%
2020	126,014,024	+12.2%
Source: INEGI

Estimates vary for the Pre-Columbian population of Mexico from 1.5 million to 21 million, but the most accepted figure is about 12 million people, including the population of the Aztec Empire which is estimated at 6 million people. In 1600, the population was estimated to have been around 1 to 2 million, having drastically declined due to disease and warfare following Spanish conquest. By 1700, the population was estimated to be around 4 million. In 1900, the Mexican population was 13.6 million.

During the period of economic prosperity that was dubbed by economists as the "Mexican Miracle", the government invested in efficient social programs that reduced the infant mortality rate and increased life expectancy. These measures jointly led to an intense demographic increase between 1930 and 1980.

Intense population growth in the northern states, especially along the US-Mexican border, changed the country's demographic profile in the second half of the 20th century, as the 1967 US-Mexico maquiladora agreement through which all products manufactured in the border cities could be imported duty-free to the US. Since the adoption of NAFTA in 1994, which allows all products to be imported duty-free regardless of their place of origin within Mexico, the non-border maquiladora share of exports has increased while that of border cities has decreased. This has led to decentralization and rapid economic growth in Mexican states (and cities), such as Quintana Roo (Cancun), Baja California Sur (La Paz), Nuevo León (Monterrey), Querétaro, and Aguascalientes whose population grew by more than one-third from 2000 to 2015, while the whole of Mexico grew by 22.6% in this period.

The national annual growth rate was still positive (1.0%) in the early years of the 2000s. The national net migration rate was negative (-4.75/1000 inhabitants). In the 2010s, the net migration rate reached 0, given the strong economy of Mexico, changes in US Immigration Policy & Enforcement, US Legislative and CFR-8 decisions, plus the slowly recovering US economy, causing many of its former residents to return. Given the former strong flow of immigrants to the United States. an estimated 5.3 million undocumented Mexican immigrants lived in the United States in 2004. In the 2000 census, 18.2 million American citizens declared having Mexican ancestry.

The population's annual growth rate has been reduced from a 3.5% peak in 1965 to 0.99% in 2005. While Mexico is now transitioning to the third phase of demographic transition, close to 50% of the population in 2009 was 25 years old or younger. Fertility rates have also decreased from 5.7 children per woman in 1976 to 1.9 in 2020. After decades of the gap narrowing, in 2020 the fertility rate in Mexico fell below the United States for the first time falling 22% in 2020 and a further 10.5% in the first half of 2021 due to the COVID-19 pandemic. The Mexican government projects that the country's population will grow to about 123 million by 2042 and then start declining slowly. Assumptions underlying this projection include fertility stabilizing at 1.85 children per woman and continued high net emigration (slowly decreasing from 583,000 in 2005 to 393,000 in 2050).

Mexico is composed of 32 federal entities which include 31 states and Mexico City, the five most populous federal entities in 2020 were the State of Mexico (16.9 million), Mexico City (9.2 million), Jalisco (8.3 million), Veracruz (8.0 million) and Puebla (6.5 million), which collectively contain around 40% of the national population. The Greater Mexico City metro area, which includes Mexico City and adjacent municipalities of surrounding states, is the most populous in the country and is estimated to be the second most populous in the world (after Tokyo), according to the UN Urbanization Report.

The average annual population growth rate of Mexico City was 0.2%. The state with the lowest population growth rate over the same period was Michoacán (-0.1%), whereas the states with the highest population growth rates were Quintana Roo (4.7%) and Baja California Sur (3.4%), both of which are two of the least populous states and the last to be admitted to the Union in the 1970s. The average annual net migration rate of Mexico City over the same period was negative and the lowest of all political divisions of Mexico, whereas the states with the highest net migration rate were Quintana Roo (2.7), Baja California (1.8) and Baja California Sur (1.6).

=== UN estimates ===
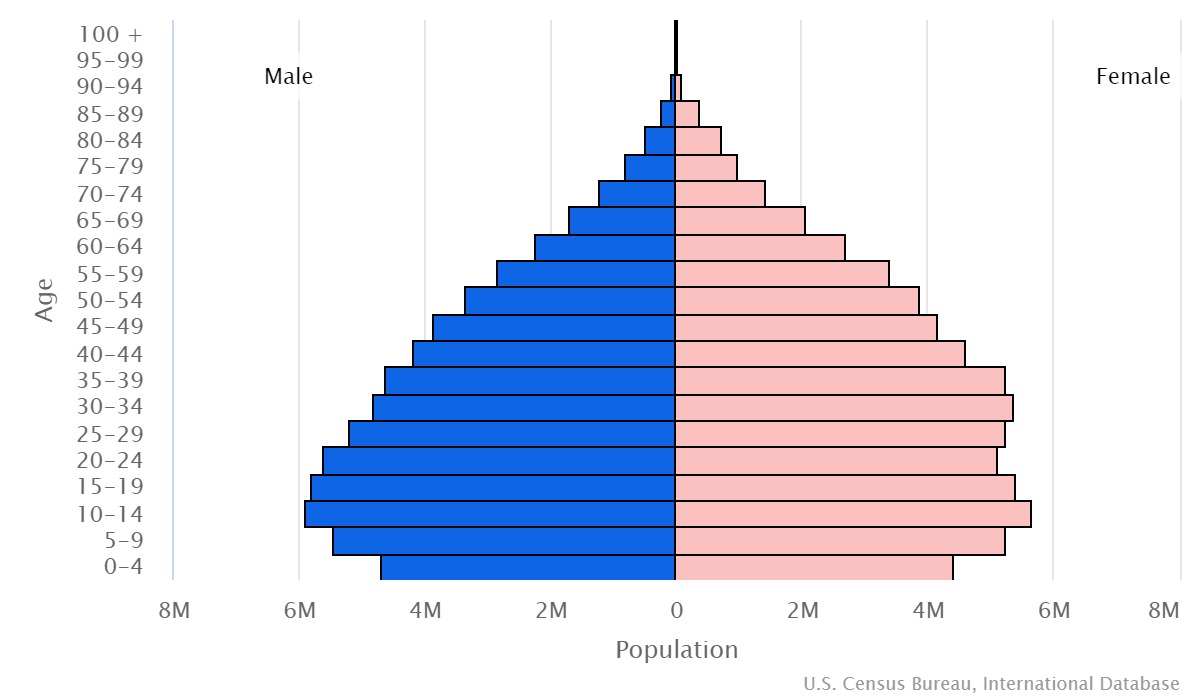
Mexico's population pyramid, 2022

In 2010, the population was 117,886,000, compared to 28,296,000 in 1950. The proportion of children below the age of 15 in 2010 was 30%. 64% of the population was between 15 and 65 years of age, and 6% was 65 years or older.

Year	Total population (× 1000)	Proportions by age band (%)		
Year	Total population (× 1000)	0–14	15–64	65+
1950	28 296	42.5	54.1	3.5
1955	33 401	44.5	52.2	3.3
1960	38 677	45.9	50.8	3.4
1965	45 339	46.8	49.6	3.5
1970	52 988	46.6	49.7	3.7
1975	61 708	46.2	50.1	3.7
1980	70 353	44.7	51.5	3.8
1985	77 859	42.1	53.9	3.9
1990	86 077	38.5	57.2	4.3
1995	95 393	35.9	59.6	4.5
2000	103 874	34.1	61.0	4.9
2005	110 732	32.3	62.4	5.3
2010	117 886	30.0	64.0	6.0
2015	127 017	27.6	65.9	6.5
2020	134 837	25.6	66.9	7.6

Note: Percentages may not add to exactly 100% due to rounding.

=== Structure of the population ===
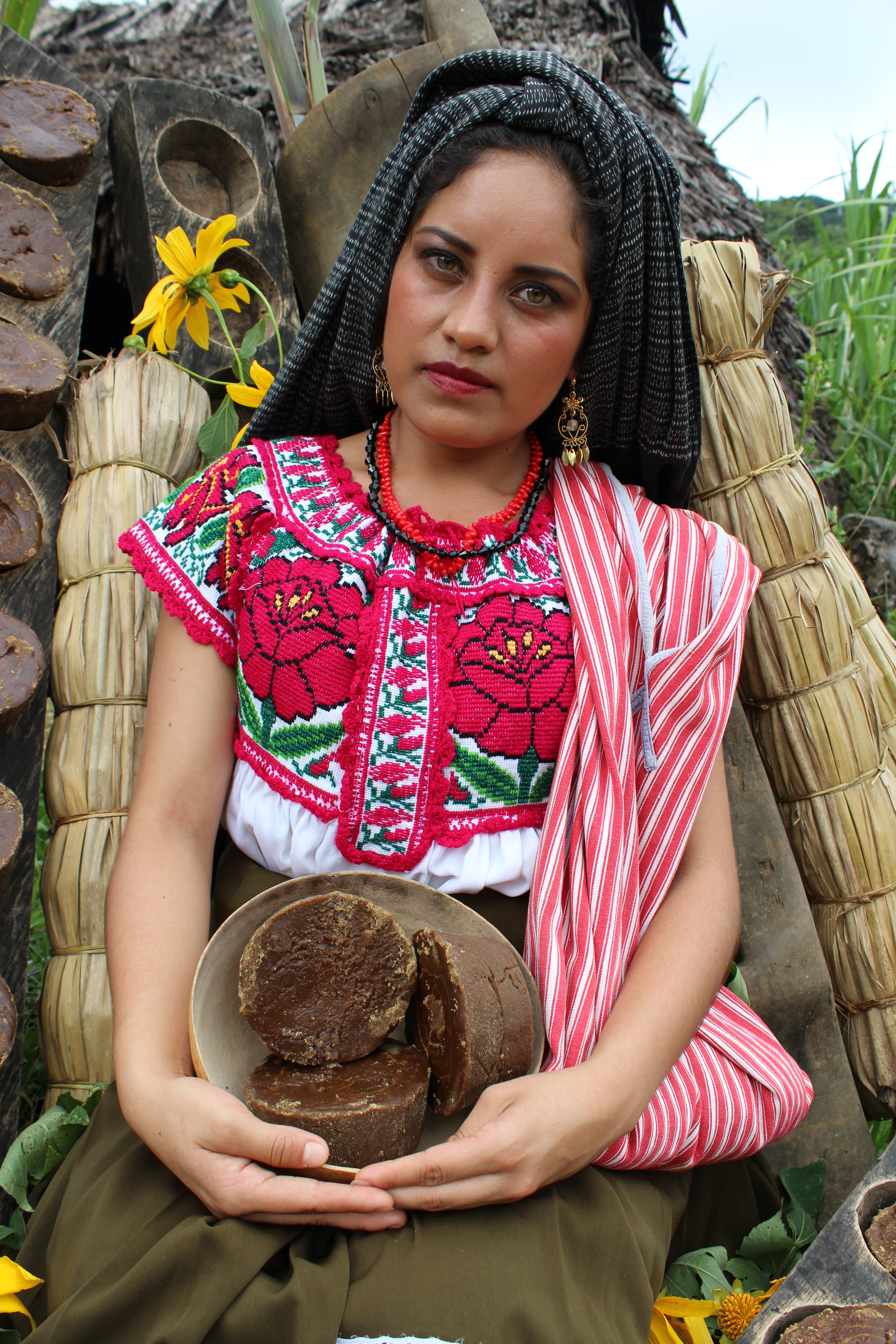
A Mestiza woman clad in indigenous clothes

Population by Sex and Age Group, 2010 census. Including an estimation of 1,334,585 people corresponding to 448,195 housing units without information of the occupants:

Age group	Male	Female	Total	%
Total	54 855 231	57 481 307	112 336 538	100
0–4	5 346 943	5 181 379	10 528 322	9.37
5–9	5 604 175	5 443 362	11 047 537	9.83
10–14	5 547 613	5 392 324	10 939 937	9.74
15–19	5 520 121	5 505 991	11 026 112	9.82
20–24	4 813 204	5 079 067	9 892 271	8.81
25–29	4 205 975	4 582 202	8 788 177	7.82
30–34	4 026 031	4 444 767	8 470 798	7.54
35–39	3 964 738	4 328 249	8 292 987	7.38
40–44	3 350 322	3 658 904	7 009 226	6.24
45–49	2 824 364	3 104 366	5 928 730	5.28
50–54	2 402 451	2 661 840	5 064 291	4.51
55–59	1 869 537	2 025 828	3 895 365	3.47
60–64	1 476 667	1 639 799	3 116 466	2.77
65–69	1 095 273	1 221 992	2 317 265	2.06
70–74	873 893	1 000 041	1 873 934	1.67
75–79	579 689	665 794	1 245 483	1.11
80–84	355 277	443 659	798 936	0.71
85–89	197 461	256 703	454 164	0.40
90–94	68 130	96 794	164 924	0.15
95–99	25 920	39 812	65 732	0.06
100+	7 228	11 247	18 475	0.02
Age group	Male	Female	Total	Percent
0–14	16 498 731	16 017 065	32 515 796	28.94
15–64	34 453 410	37 031 013	71 484 423	63.63
65+	3 202 871	3 736 042	6 938 913	6.18
unknown	700 219	697 187	1 397 406	1.24

Population by Sex and Age Group, 2020 census. Including an estimation of 6,337,751 persons corresponding to 1,588,422 housing units without information of the occupants.:

Age group	Male	Female	Total	%
Total	61 473 390	64 540 634	126 014 024	100
0–4	5 077 482	4 969 883	10 047 365	7.97
5–9	5 453 091	5 311 288	10 764 379	8.54
10–14	5 554 260	5 389 280	10 943 540	8.68
15–19	5 462 150	5 344 540	10 806 690	8.57
20–24	5 165 884	5 256 211	10 422 095	8.27
25–29	4 861 404	5 131 597	9 993 001	7.93
30–34	4 527 726	4 893 101	9 420 827	7.47
35–39	4 331 530	4 668 746	9 020 276	7.15
40–44	4 062 304	4 441 282	8 503 586	6.74
45–49	3 812 344	4 130 069	7 942 413	6.30
50–54	3 332 163	3 705 360	7 037 532	5.58
55–59	2 692 976	3 002 982	5 695 958	4.52
60–64	2 257 862	2 563 200	4 821 062	3.82
65–69	1 706 850	1 938 227	3 645 077	2.89
70–74	1 233 492	1 413 848	2 647 340	2.10
75–79	847 898	966 684	1 814 582	1.43
80–84	523 812	651 552	1 175 364	0.93
85+	433 968	605 583	1 039 551	0.82
Age group	Male	Female	Total	Percent
0–14	16 084 833	15 670 451	31 755 284	25.20
15–64	40 506 343	43 157 097	83 663 440	66.39
65+	4 746 020	5 575 894	10 321 914	8.19
unknown	136 194	137 192	273 386	0.22

View source data.
View source data.
View source data.

== Vital statistics ==
=== Registered births and deaths ===
Source: Instituto Nacional de Estadística, Geografía e Informática (INEGI)

	Average population	Birth registrations	Live births	Deaths	Natural change	Crude birth rate (per 1000)	Crude death rate (per 1000)	Natural change (per 1000)	Crude migration change (per 1000)	Total fertility rate	Life expectancy
1936		791,725								5.86	
1937		826,307								5.83	
1938		829,651				43.5				5.87	
1939		865,081				44.6				5.90	
1940	19,763,000	875,471				44.3				5.93	
1941	20,208,000	878,935				43.5				5.96	
1942	20,657,000	940,067				45.5				5.99	
1943	21,165,000	963,317				45.5				6.07	
1944	21,674,000	958,119				44.2				6.16	
1945	22,233,000	999,093				44.9				6.24	
1946	22,779,000	994,838		442,935	551,903	43.7	19.4	24.3	-0.3	6.32	
1947	23,440,000	1,079,816		390,087	689,729	46.1	16.6	29.5	-1.2	6.41	
1948	24,129,000	1,090,867		407,708	683,159	44.7	16.9	27.8	0.3	6.49	
1949	24,833,000	1,123,358		443,559	670,476	46.0	17.7	28.3	1.4	6.58	
1950	28,296,000	1,174,947		418,430	756,517	41.5	14.8	26.7	101.9	6.66	
1951	29,110,000	1,183,788		458,238	725,550	40.7	15.7	24.9	3.9	6.68	
1952	29,980,000	1,195,209		408,823	786,386	39.9	13.6	26.2	3.7	6.72	
1953	30,904,000	1,261,775		446,127	815,648	40.8	14.4	26.4	4.4	6.74	
1954	31,880,000	1,339,837		378,752	961,085	42.0	11.9	30.1	1.5	6.76	
1955	32,906,000	1,377,917		407,522	970,395	41.9	12.4	29.5	2.7	6.78	
1956	33,978,000	1,427,722		368,740	1,058,982	42.0	10.9	31.2	1.4	6.78	
1957	35,095,000	1,485,202		414,545	1,070,657	42.3	11.8	30.5	2.4	6.78	
1958	36,253,000	1,447,578		404,529	1,043,049	39.9	11.2	28.8	4.2	6.78	
1959	37,448,000	1,589,606		396,924	1,192,682	42.4	10.6	31.8	1.2	6.77	
1960	38,677,000	1,608,174		402,545	1,205,629	41.6	10.4	31.2	1.6	6.77	
1961	39,939,000	1,647,006		388,857	1,258,149	41.2	9.7	31.5	1.1	6.76	
1962	41,234,000	1,705,481		403,046	1,302,435	41.4	9.8	31.6	0.8	6.76	
1963	42,564,000	1,756,624		412,834	1,343,790	41.3	9.7	31.6	0.7	6.75	
1964	43,931,000	1,849,408		408,275	1,441,133	42.1	9.3	32.8	-0.7	6.75	
1965	45,339,000	1,888,171		404,163	1,484,008	41.6	8.9	32.7	-0.6	6.76	
1966	46,784,000	1,954,340		424,141	1,530,199	41.8	9.1	32.7	-0.8	6.77	
1967	48,264,000	1,981,363		420,298	1,561,065	41.1	8.7	32.3	-0.7	6.79	
1968	49,788,000	2,058,251		452,910	1,605,341	41.3	9.1	32.2	-0.6	6.81	
1969	51,361,000	2,088,902		458,886	1,630,016	39.7	8.9	30.7	0.9	6.83	
1970	52,988,000	2,132,630		485,656	1,646,974	40.2	9.2	31.1	0.6	6.83	
1971	54,669,000	2,231,399		458,323	1,773,076	40.8	8.4	32.4	-0.7	6.79	
1972	56,396,000	2,346,002		476,206	1,869,796	41.6	8.4	33.2	-1.6	6.70	
1973	58,156,000	2,572,287		458,915	2,113,372	44.2	7.9	36.3	-5.1	6.56	
1974	59,931,000	2,607,452		433,104	2,089,476	42.1	7.2	34.9	-4.4	6.37	
1975	61,708,000	2,429,768		435,888	1,818,609	36.5	7.1	29.5	0.2	6.13	
1976	63,486,000	2,370,025		455,660	1,910,645	37.3	7.2	30.1	-1.3	5.86	
1977	65,261,000	2,402,418		450,454	1,928,873	36.5	6.9	29.6	-1.6		
1978	67,013,000	2,346,862		418,381	1,928,481	35.0	6.2	28.8	-2.0		
1979	68,715,000	2,448,774		428,217	1,846,050	33.1	6.2	26.9	-1.5		
1980	70,353,000	2,427,628		434,465	2,011,773	34.8	6.2	28.6	-4.8		
1981	71,916,000	2,530,662		424,274	2,106,388	35.2	5.9	29.3	-7.1	4.6	
1982	73,416,000	2,392,849		412,345	1,980,504	32.6	5.6	27.0	-6.1		
1983	74,880,000	2,609,088		413,403	2,195,685	34.8	5.5	29.3	-9.4		
1984	76,351,000	2,511,894		410,550	2,101,344	32.9	5.4	27.5	-7.9		
1985	77,859,000	2,655,571	2,474,957	414,003	2,241,668	34.1	5.3	28.8	-9.0		
1986	79,410,000	2,579,301	2,536,014	400,079	2,176,966	32.5	5.0	27.4	-7.5		
1987	80,999,000	2,794,390	2,511,891	406,913	2,394,110	34.5	4.9	29.6	-10.0	3.8	
1988	82,635,000	2,622,031	2,543,021	412,987	2,209,044	31.7	5.0	26.7	-7.1		
1989	84,327,000	2,620,262	2,580,454	423,304	2,196,958	31.1	5.0	26.1	-6.1		
1990	86,077,000	2,735,312	2,635,427	422,803	2,312,509	31.8	4.9	26.9	-6.7	3.47	
1991	87,890,000	2,756,447	2,632,462	411,131	2,345,316	31.4	4.7	26.7	-6.1	3.37	
1992	89,758,000	2,797,397	2,674,492	409,814	2,387,583	31.2	4.6	26.6	-5.9	3.27	
1993	91,654,000	2,839,686	2,646,775	416,335	2,423,351	31.0	4.5	26.4	-5.9	3.18	
1994	93,542,000	2,904,389	2,644,274	419,074	2,485,315	31.0	4.5	26.6	-6.5	3.10	
1995	95,393,000	2,750,444	2,604,709	430,278	2,320,166	28.8	4.5	24.3	-5.0	3.02	
1996	97,202,000	2,707,718	2,501,678	436,321	2,271,397	27.9	4.5	23.4	-4.8	2.95	
1997	98,969,000	2,698,425	2,468,084	440,437	2,257,988	27.3	4.5	22.8	-5.1	2.88	
1998	100,679,000	2,668,428	2,497,680	444,665	2,223,763	26.5	4.4	22.1	-5.2	2.82	
1999	102,317,000	2,769,089	2,504,433	443,950	2,325,139	27.1	4.3	22.7	-6.8	2.77	
2000	103,874,000	2,798,339	2,580,918	437,667	2,360,672	26.9	4.2	22.7	-7.9	2.72	
2001	105,340,000	2,767,610	2,495,027	443,127	2,324,483	26.3	4.2	22.1	-8.3	2.67	
2002	106,724,000	2,699,084	2,477,304	459,687	2,239,397	25.3	4.3	21.0	-8.1	2.62	
2003	108,056,000	2,655,894	2,425,408	472,140	2,183,754	24.6	4.4	20.2	-8.0	2.58	
2004	109,382,000	2,625,056	2,407,144	473,417	2,151,639	24.0	4.3	19.7	-7.6	2.54	
2005	110,732,000	2,567,906	2,379,913	495,240	2,072,666	23.2	4.5	18.7	-6.6	2.50	
2006	112,117,000	2,505,939	2,372,982	494,471	2,011,468	22.4	4.4	17.9	-5.7	2.46	
2007	113,530,000	2,655,083	2,388,445	514,420	2,140,663	23.4	4.5	18.9	-6.5	2.42	
2008	114,968,000	2,636,110	2,410,505	539,530	2,096,580	22.9	4.7	18.2	-5.8	2.39	
2009	116,423,000	2,577,214	2,396,969	564,673	2,012,541	22.1	4.9	17.3	-4.8	2.36	
2010	114,255,000	2,643,908	2,377,010	592,018	2,051,890	23.1	5.2	17.9	-36.2	2.34	74.3
2011	115,683,000	2,586,287	2,383,883	590,693	1,995,594	22.3	5.1	17.2	-5.5	2.32	74.7
2012	117,054,000	2,498,880	2,378,246	602,354	1,896,526	21.3	5.1	16.2	-4.5	2.29	74.9
2013	118,395,000	2,478,889	2,334,129	623,599	1,855,290	20.9	5.3	15.6	-4.4	2.27	75.2
2014	119,713,000	2,463,420	2,291,428	633,641	1,829,779	20.5	5.3	15.2	-4.3	2.21	75.1
2015	121,005,000	2,353,596	2,256,528	655,688	1,697,908	19.4	5.4	14.0	-3.4	2.22	75.1
2016	122,298,000	2,293,708	2,182,066	685,766	1,607,942	18.8	5.6	13.2	-2.5	2.19	74.8
2017	123,415,000	2,234,039	2,157,276	703,047	1,530,992	18.1	5.8	12.3	-3.2	2.17	74.8
2018	124,738,000	2,162,535	2,070,173	722,611	1,439,924	17.3	5.8	11.5	-0.8	2.07	74.9
2019	125,930,000	2,092,214	1,954,398	747,784	1,344,430	16.5	5.9	10.6	-1.0	1.88	74.8
2020	126,014,024	1,629,211	1,850,916	1,086,743	542,468	12.9	8.6	4.3	-3.6		68.9
2021	127,488,991	1,912,178	1,700,606	1,122,249	789,929	15.1	8.8	6.3	-0.8		68.8
2022	128,533,664	1,891,388	1,670,634	847,716	1,043,672	14.8	6.7	8.1	-1.9		75.2
2023	129,202,482	1,820,888	1,530,190	799,869	1,021,019	14.2	6.2	8.0	-0.2	1.60	75.3
2024	129,940,228	1,672,227	1,381,457	819,672	852,555	12.9	6.3	6.6	-0.81	1.2	75.4
2025	130,575,786	1,678,532	1,058,332	792,187	886,345	12.9	6.1	6.8			75.7
2026	131,231,919										75.9

==== Current vital statistics ====
Period	Live births	Deaths	Natural increase
January – March 2025		212,844	
January – March 2026		207,599	
Difference		▼ –5,245 (–2.5%)	

=== Total fertility rate by state ===
Total fertility rate (TFR) in Mexico by state as of 2024:

2024
state	TFR
Chiapas	1.75
Guerrero	1.59
Durango	1.51
Zacatecas	1.49
Tabasco	1.45
Nayarit	1.41
Michoacán	1.40
Oaxaca	1.39
Coahuila	1.37
San Luis Potosí	1.35
Guanajuato	1.30
Puebla	1.29
Sonora	1.27
Sinaloa	1.26
Tamaulipas	1.25
Tlaxcala	1.25
Veracruz	1.24
Mexico	1.23
Campeche	1.23
Jalisco	1.23
Chihuahua	1.20
Baja California Sur	1.20
Aguascalientes	1.20
Colima	1.19
Morelos	1.13
Hidalgo	1.13
Quintana Roo	1.11
Yucatán	1.10
State of Mexico	1.07
Querétaro	1.06
Baja California	1.04
Mexico City	0.79

Total fertility rate by state and year; intercensal surveys

2014

2024
Total fertility rate in Mexico City

2024

=== CBR and CDR estimates ===
The following estimates were prepared by the Instituto Nacional de Estadística, Geografía e Informatica:

Life expectancy in Mexico, 1893 to 2023

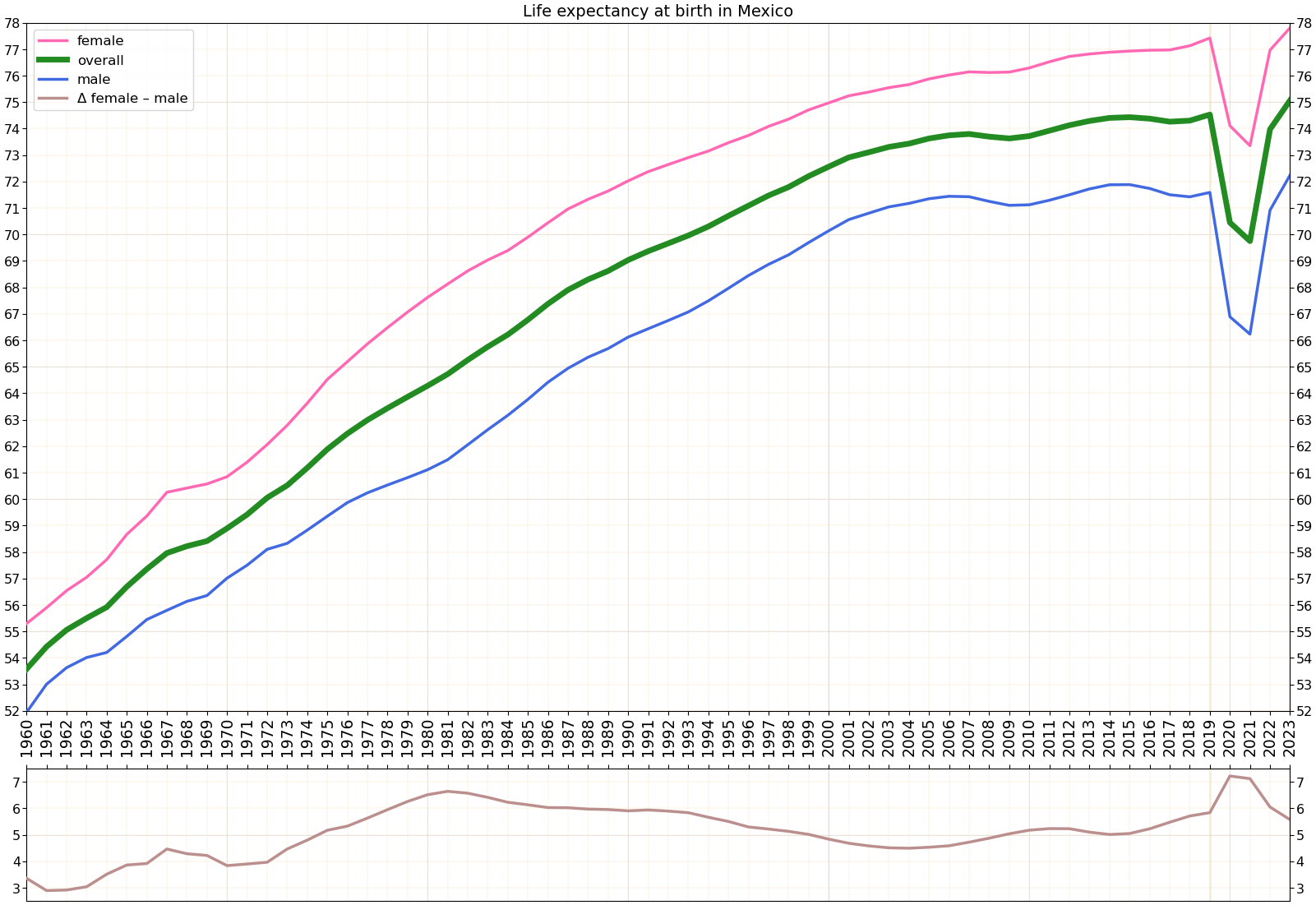
Life expectancy in Mexico by gender, 1960 to 2023

	Crude birth rate (per 1000)	Crude death rate (per 1000)	Natural change (per 1000)	Total fertility rate
1976				5.7
1981				4.4
1987				3.8
1990	27.9	5.6	22.3	3.4
1991	27.5	5.5	22.0	3.3
1992	27.1	5.4	21.7	3.2
1993	26.8	5.3	21.5	3.1
1994	26.3	5.2	21.1	3.0
1995	25.9	5.2	20.7	3.0
1996	25.4	5.1	20.3	2.9
1997	24.8	5.1	19.7	2.8
1998	24.3	5.1	19.2	2.8
1999	23.9	5.1	18.8	2.7
2000	23.4	5.1	18.3	2.6
2001	23.0	5.1	17.9	2.6
2002	22.6	5.1	17.5	2.6
2003	22.2	5.2	17.0	2.5
2004	21.8	5.2	16.6	2.5
2005	21.5	5.2	16.3	2.5
2006	21.1	5.3	15.8	2.4
2007	20.8	5.3	15.5	2.4
2008	20.4	5.4	15.0	2.3
2009	20.1	5.5	14.6	2.3
2010	19.7	5.6	14.1	2.3
2011	19.4	5.6	13.8	2.3
2012	19.2	5.7	13.5	2.2
2013	19.0	5.7	13.3	2.2
2014	18.7	5.7	13.0	2.2
2015	18.5	5.7	12.8	2.2
2016	18.3	5.8	12.5	2.2

==== TFR before 1936 ====
Years	1900	1901	1902	1903	1904	1905	1906	1907	1908	1909
Total Fertility Rate in Mexico	6.80	6.52	6.23	6.22	6.20	6.19	6.18	6.16	6.09	6.01

Years	1910	1911	1912	1913	1914	1915	1916	1917	1918	1919
Total Fertility Rate in Mexico	5.94	5.86	5.79	5.72	5.65	5.58	5.51	5.44	5.57	5.69

Years	1920	1921	1922	1923	1924	1925	1926	1927	1928	1929
Total Fertility Rate in Mexico	5.82	5.94	6.07	6.04	6.02	5.99	5.96	5.94	5.94	5.95

Years	1930	1931	1932	1933	1934	1935
Total Fertility Rate in Mexico	5.96	5.97	5.98	5.95	5.92	5.89

=== Life expectancy from 1893 to 1950 ===
Life expectancy in Mexico from 1893 to 1950. Source: Our World In Data

Years	1893	1894	1895	1896	1897	1898	1899	1900	1901	1902	1903	1904	1905	1906	1907	1908	1909	1910
Life expectancy in Mexico	23.3	26.6	29.5	28.8	26.2	27.0	25.0	25.0	26.7	28.4	28.7	29.1	26.8	27.8	28.0	28.7	29.2	28.0

Years	1920	1922	1923	1924	1925	1926	1927	1928	1929	1930
Life expectancy in Mexico	34.0	32.6	33.5	32.8	32.1	34.2	40.3	34.5	35.4	34.0

Years	1931	1932	1933	1934	1935	1936	1937	1938	1939	1940
Life expectancy in Mexico	37.7	38.4	37.3	38.2	40.4	38.3	36.8	39.4	45.5	39.0

Years	1941	1942	1943	1944	1945	1946	1947	1948	1949	1950
Life expectancy in Mexico	42.6	39.8	42.8	43.2	44.2	44.8	46.3	48.3	45.8	50.7

=== UN estimates ===
The Population Department of the United Nations prepared the following estimates.

Period	Live births	Deaths	Natural change	CBR*	CDR*	NC*	TFR*	IMR*	Life expectancy		
Period	per year			CBR*	CDR*	NC*	TFR*	IMR*	Overall	Males	Females
1950–1955	1 469 000	509 000	959 000	48.3	16.7	31.6	6.75	121	50.7	48.9	52.5
1955–1960	1 675 000	483 000	1 193 000	46.6	13.5	33.1	6.78	102	55.3	53.3	57.3
1960–1965	1 878 000	481 000	1 397 000	44.6	11.5	33.1	6.75	88	58.5	56.4	60.6
1965–1970	2 147 000	510 000	1 637 000	43.6	10.4	33.2	6.75	80	60.3	58.2	62.5
1970–1975	2 434 000	521 000	1 913 000	43.7	9.2	34.5	6.71	69	62.6	60.1	65.2
1975–1980	2 406 000	490 000	1 916 000	37.2	7.5	29.7	5.40	57	65.3	62.2	68.6
1980–1985	2 352 000	470 000	1 882 000	32.3	6.3	26.0	4.37	47	67.7	64.4	71.2
1985–1990	2 385 000	466 000	1 919 000	29.7	5.7	24.0	3.75	40	69.8	66.8	73.0
1990–1995	2 493 000	470 000	2 022 000	27.4	5.2	22.3	3.23	33	71.8	69.0	74.6
1995–2000	2 535 000	471 000	2 064 000	25.2	4.8	20.5	2.85	28	73.3	71.3	76.1
2000–2005	2 449 000	492 000	1 958 000	23.0	4.6	18.4	2.61	21	75.1	72.4	77.4
2005–2010	2 355 000	513 000	1 841 000	20.7	4.6	16.1	2.40	17	75.1	73.7	78.6
2010–2015	2 353 000	579 000	1 774 000	19.4	4.8	14.6	2.29		74.9		
2015–2020	2 291 000	635 000	1 656 000	17.6	4.9	12.7	2.14		74.9		
2020–2025	2 206 000	699 000	1 507 000	16.0	5.1	11.0	2.00				
2025–2030	2 105 000	773 000	1 332 000	14.6	5.4	9.2	1.89				
2030–2035	2 014 000	860 000	1 154 000	13.4	5.7	7.7	1.81				
2035–2040	1 936 000	960 000	976 000	12.5	6.2	6.3	1.76				
* CBR = crude birth rate (per 1000); CDR = crude death rate (per 1000); NC = natural change (per 1000); IMR = infant mortality rate per 1000 births; TFR = total fertility rate (number of children per woman)

== International migration ==
=== Immigration to Mexico ===
Place	Foreign-born population in Mexico	2020
1	United States	797,266
2	Guatemala	56,810
3	Venezuela	52,948
4	Colombia	36,234
5	Honduras	35,361
6	Cuba	25,976
7	Spain	20,763
8	El Salvador	19,736
9	Argentina	18,693
10	Canada	12,439
11	China	10,547
12	France	9,080
13	Brazil	8,689
14	Peru	8,670
15	Germany	6,860
16	Italy	6,619
17	Chile	6,532
18	Haiti	5,895
19	Nicaragua	5,731
20	Japan	5,539
21	South Korea	5,339
22	United Kingdom	4,030
23	Ecuador	3,995
24	Costa Rica	3,803
25	Dominican Republic	2,849
26	Belize	2,813
27	Uruguay	2,706
28	India	2,656
29	Bolivia	2,505
30	Russia	2,321
31	Panama	1,916
32	Switzerland	1,439
	Other countries	25,492
TOTAL		1,212,252
Source: INEGI (2020)

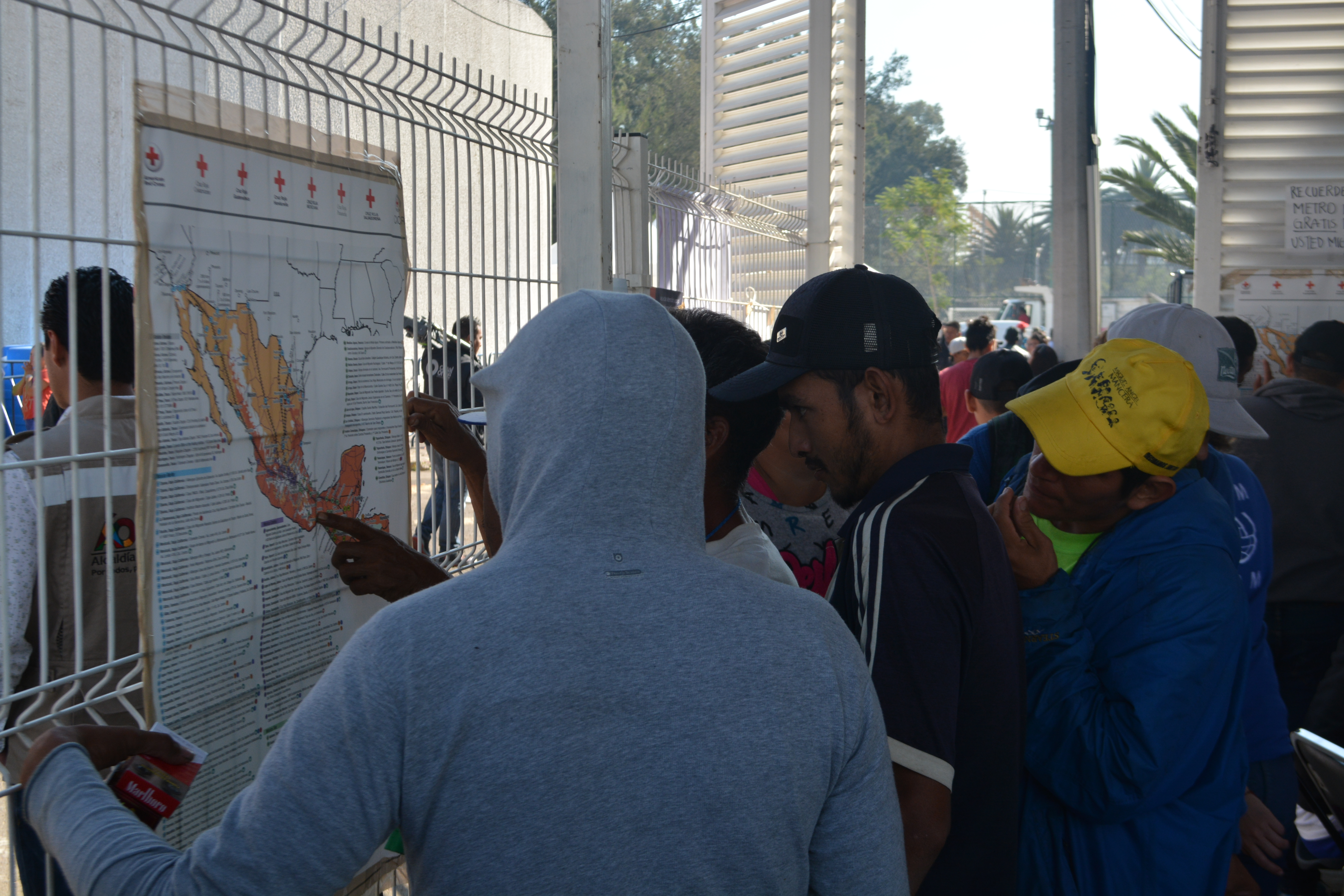
Central American migrant caravans migrants looking for routes on a map of Mexico, November 2018

Aside from the original Spanish colonists, many Europeans immigrated to Mexico in the late 19th and early 20th centuries. Non-Spanish immigrant groups included British, Irish, Italian, German, French and Dutch. Large numbers of Middle Eastern immigrants arrived in Mexico during the same period, mostly from Syria and Lebanon. Asian immigrants, mostly Chinese, some via the United States, settled in northern Mexico, whereas Koreans settled in central Mexico. The PRI governments, in power for most of the 20th century, had a policy of granting asylum to fellow Latin Americans fleeing political persecution in their home countries. This led to the arrival of immigrants, mainly political refugees from Argentina, Chile, Cuba, Peru, Colombia and Central America during the 1970s and 1980s.

A second wave of immigrants has come to Mexico as a result of the economic crises experienced by some countries in the region. The Argentine community is quite significant estimated to be somewhere between 11,000 and 30,000. Due to the 2008–2014 Spanish financial crisis, many Spaniards have been emigrating to Mexico to seek new opportunities. For example, during the last quarter of 2012, a number of 7,630 work permits were granted to Spaniards.

Mexico is also the country where the largest number of American citizens live abroad, with Mexico City playing host to the largest number of American citizens abroad in the world. The American Citizens Abroad Association estimated in 1999 that a little more than one million Americans live in Mexico (which represent 1% of the population in Mexico and 25% of all American citizens living abroad). This immigration phenomenon could well be explained by the interaction of both countries under the North American Free Trade Agreement (NAFTA), but also by the fact that Mexico has become a popular destination for retirees, especially the small towns: just in the State of Guanajuato, in San Miguel de Allende and its surroundings, 10,000 Americans have their residence.

Discrepancies between the figures of official legal immigrants and all foreign-born residents is quite large. The official figure for foreign-born residents in Mexico in 2020 was 1,212,252, with the majority being born in the United States, who also are the most common immigrant group across the country's states with the exception of the state of Chiapas, where the majority of immigrants are from Central America. The six states with the most immigrants are Baja California (12.1% of total immigrants), Mexico City (11.4%), Jalisco (9.9%), Chihuahua (9%) and Tamaulipas (7.3%).

=== Emigration from Mexico ===
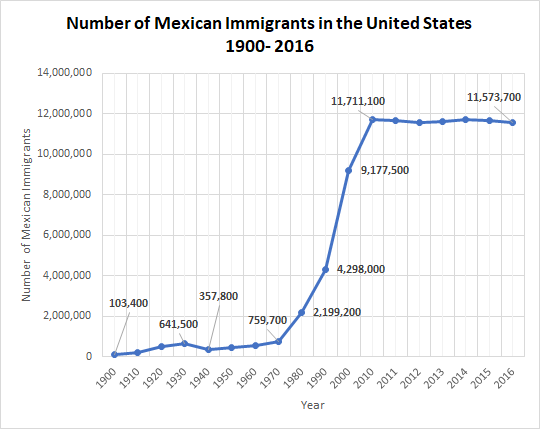
Trend of Mexican migration to the United States. Here the term immigrant refers to those who were not born in the U.S. but are now currently residing in the U.S. This can include naturalized U.S. citizens, legal permanent residents, employees and students on visas, and the undocumented.

The national net migration rate of Mexico is negative, estimated at -1.8 migrants per 1,000 population as of 2017. The great majority of Mexican emigrants have moved to the United States of America, this migration phenomenon has been a defining feature in the relationship of both countries for most of the 20th century. During World Wars I and II, the United States government approved the recruitment of Mexican workers in their territory, and tolerated unauthorized migration to obtain additional farm and industrial workers to fill the necessary spots vacated by the population in war, and to supply the increase in the demand for labor. Nonetheless, the United States unilaterally ended the wartime programs, in part as a result of arguments from labor and from civil-rights groups. In spite of that, emigration of Mexicans continued at varying rates, growing significantly during the 1990s and the first years of the 2000s, it has been estimated that 37% of all Mexican immigrants to the United States in the 20th century arrived during the 1990s. In the year 2000 approximately 20 million American residents identified themselves as either Mexican, Mexican-Americans or of Mexican origin, making "Mexican" the sixth-most cited ancestry of all US residents.

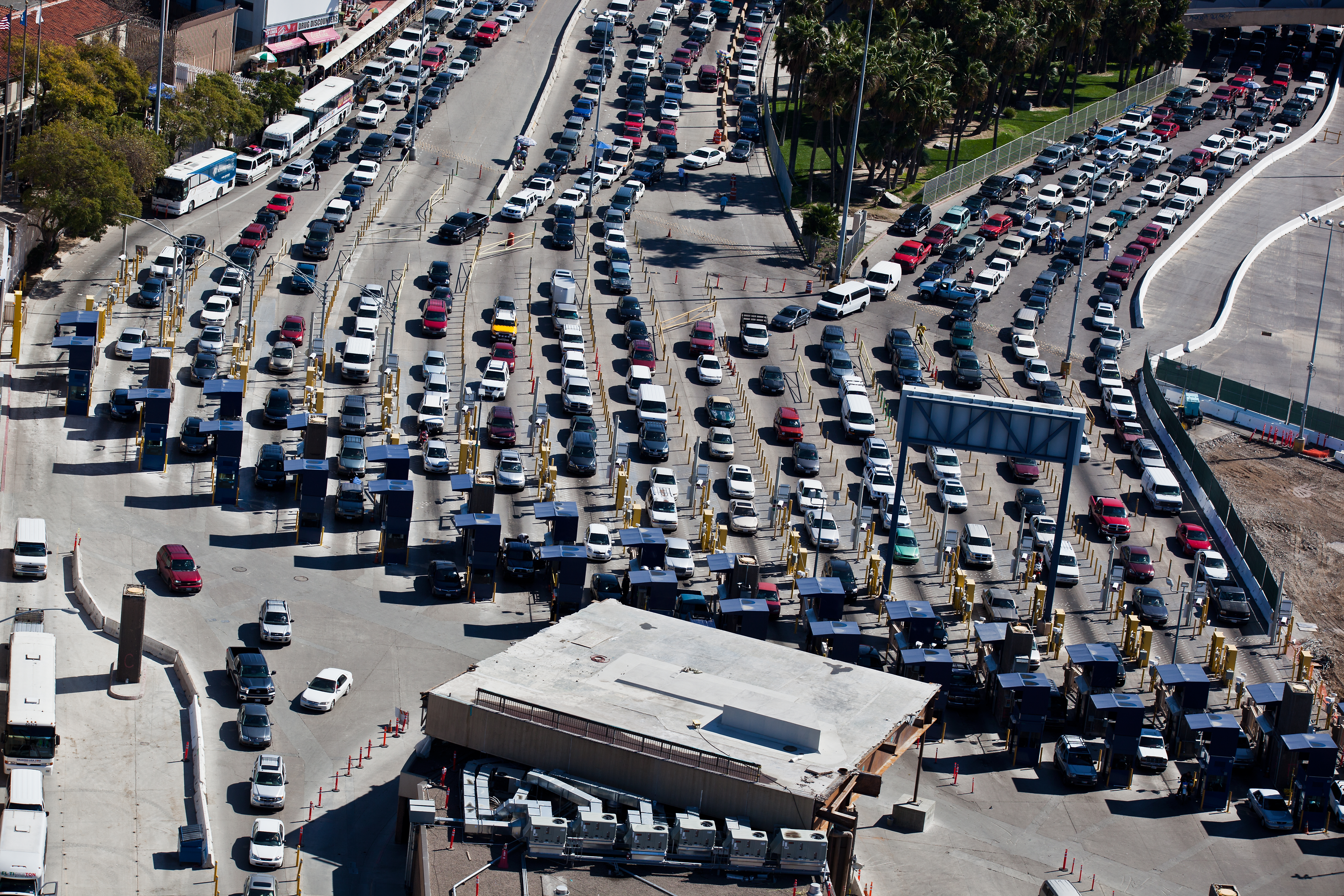
The San Ysidro Port of Entry is the fourth busiest border checkpoint in the world. Most traffic is related to commerce or day workers, rather than immigration.

In the year 2000 the INEGI estimated that about eight million Mexican-born people, which then was equivalent to 8.7% of the population of Mexico itself, lived in the United States of America and according to the Pew Hispanic Center in 2006, an estimated ten percent of all Mexican citizens lived in the United States. For the 2015-2020 period the states who sent the highest percentages of migrants to the United States were Guanajuato (7.8%), Jalisco (7.5%), Michoacán (6.3%) y el Estado de México (5.4%), with the total number of migrants being 803 thousand people, the great majority being men and approximately 30% of them coming from rural communities. For the same period, it was reported that 178 thousand migrants returned to Mexico.

The population of Mexican immigrants residing illegally in the United States fell from around seven million in 2007 to about 6.1 million in 2011. This trajectory has been linked to the 2008 financial crisis, which reduced available jobs, and to the introduction of stricter immigration laws in many States. According to the Pew Hispanic Center the total number of Mexican-born people had stagnated in 2010 and then began to fall. After the Mexican-American community, Mexican Canadians are the second-largest group of emigrant Mexicans, with a population of over 90,000. A significant but unknown number of mestizos of Mexican descent migrated to the Philippines during the era of the Viceroyalty of New Spain, when the Philippines was a territory under the rule of Mexico city. Mexicans live throughout Latin America as well as in Australia, France, Germany, Italy, and the United Arab Emirates.

Emigration list from Mexico Mexican residents in the world by countries
Country	Population	Pos.	Continent
United States	36,300,000	1	North America
Canada	90,585	2	North America
Spain	56,757	3	Europe
Guatemala	14,481	4	North America
Bolivia	13,377	5	South America
Germany	8,848	6	Europe
Argentina	6,750	7	South America
United Kingdom	5,125	8	Europe
Australia	4,872	9	Oceania
France	4,601	10	Europe
Israel	4,252	11	Asia
Netherlands	3,758	12	Europe
Italy	3,485	13	Europe
Venezuela	3,075	14	South America
Sweden	2,794	15	Europe
Belize	2,349	16	North America
Costa Rica	2,327	17	North America
Panama	2,299	18	North America
Colombia	2,286	19	South America
Chile	1,874	20	South America
Paraguay	1,778	21	South America
The list includes also temporary residents (1–3 years' stay)

== Cities and metropolitan areas ==
=== Settlements, cities and municipalities ===
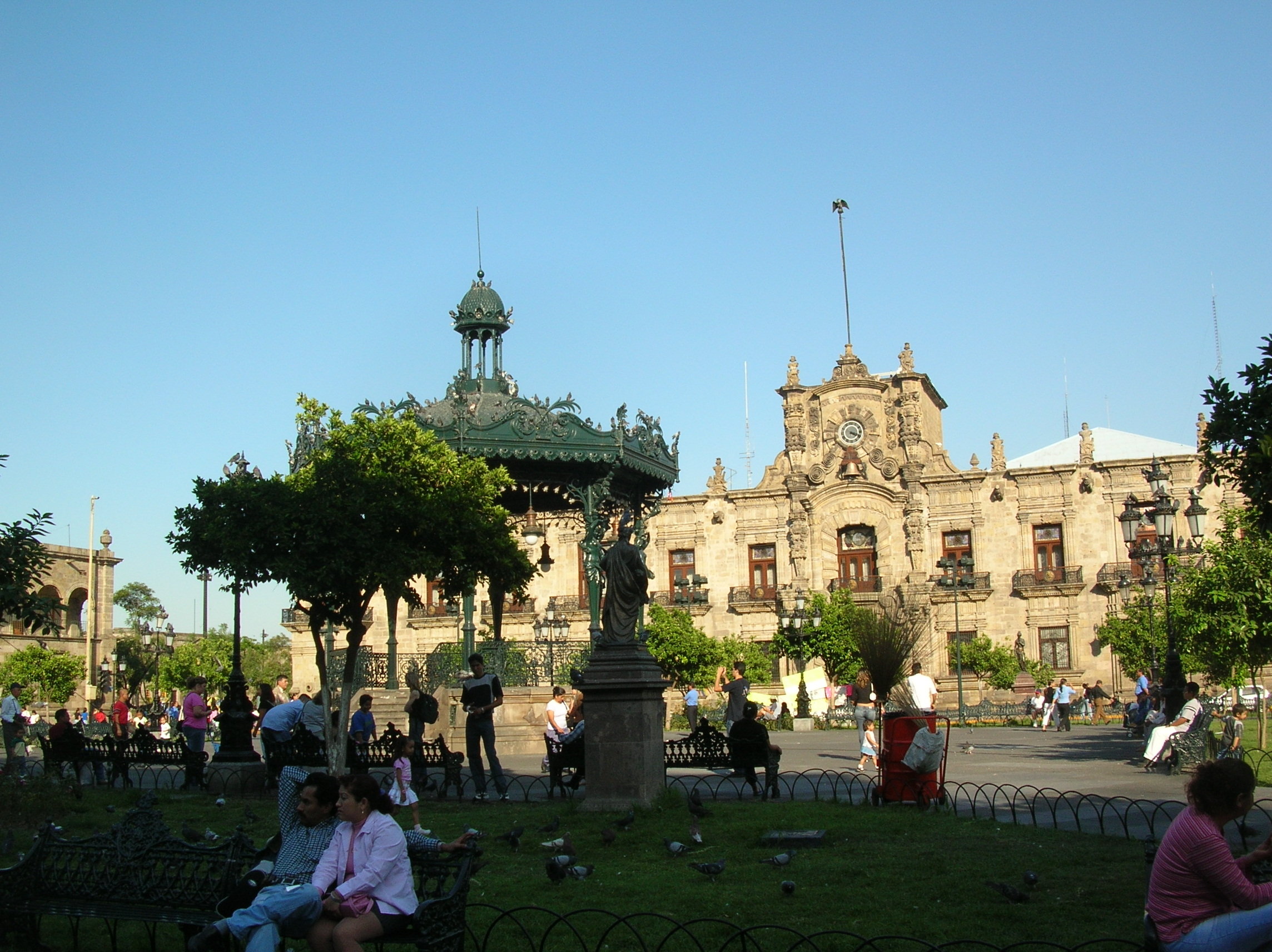
Palacio de Gobierno y Plaza de Armas de Guadalajara

Most populated municipalities
Municipality	Pop. (2020)
Mexico City	9,209,944
Tijuana	1,922,523
León	1,721,215
Puebla	1,692,181
Ecatepec	1,645,352
Juárez	1,512,450
Guadalajara	1,385,629
Monterrey	1,142,952

In 2010, Mexico had more than 189,432 localidades (lit. "localities" or "settlements"), which are census-designated places defined as a small town, a large city, or simply as a single unit housing in a rural area whether situated remotely or close to an urban area. Localities with more than 2,500 inhabitants are considered urban settlements. Those with less than 2500 inhabitants are considered rural settlements.

In 2010, there were 3,021 cities with a population between 2,500 and 15,000 inhabitants, 413 with a population between 15,000 and 50,000 inhabitants, 86 with a population between 50,000 and 100,000, 95 with a population between 100,000 and 500,000, 25 with a population between 500,000 and one million and 11 with a population of more than one million. Urban areas contain 76.81% of Mexico's total population and rural settlements contain 23% of the population.

Municipalities (municipios in Spanish) and boroughs (delegaciones in Spanish) are incorporated places in Mexico, that is, second or third-level political divisions with internal autonomy, legally prescribed limits, powers and functions. In terms of second-level political divisions there are 2,477 municipalities, including 16 semi-autonomous boroughs all within Mexico city. A municipality can be constituted by one or more cities one of which is the cabecera municipal (municipal seat).

Cities are usually contained within the limits of a single municipality. Small areas of one city may extend to other adjacent municipalities without incorporating the city which serves as the municipal seat of the adjacent municipality. Some municipalities or cities within municipalities are further divided into delegaciones or boroughs. Unlike the boroughs of the Federal District, these are third-level administrative divisions. They have very limited autonomy and no elective representatives.

Municipalities in central Mexico are usually very small in area and thus coextensive with cities, as is the case of Guadalajara, Puebla and León. Municipalities in northern and southeastern Mexico are much larger and usually contain more than one city or town that may not necessarily conform a single urban agglomeration, as is the case of Tijuana.

=== Metropolitan areas ===
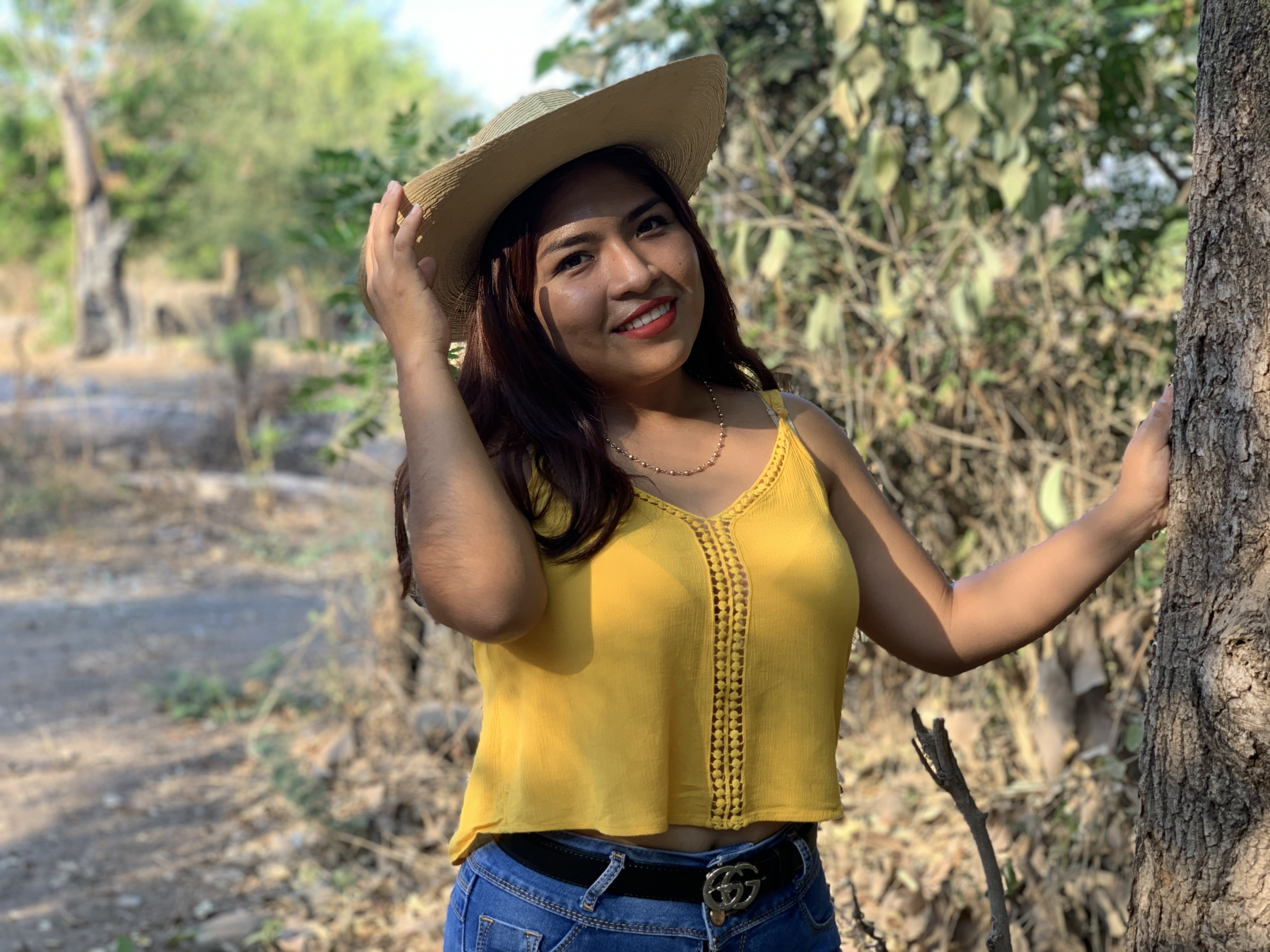
A Mexican woman from Ajuchitlán del Progreso, a Nahua area.

A metropolitan area in Mexico is defined as a group of municipalities that heavily interact with each other, usually around a core city. In 2004, a joint effort between CONAPO, INEGI and the Ministry of Social Development (SEDESOL) agreed to define metropolitan areas as either:

- a group of two or more municipalities in which a city with a population of at least 50,000 is located whose urban area extends over the limit of the municipality that originally contained the core city incorporating either physically or under its area of direct influence other adjacent predominantly urban municipalities all of which have a high degree of social and economic integration or are relevant for urban politics and administration; or
- a single municipality in which a city of a population of at least one million is located and fully contained, (that is, it does not transcend the limits of a single municipality); or
- a city with a population of at least 250,000 which forms a conurbation with other cities in the United States of America.

In 2020 there were 48 metropolitan areas in Mexico, in which close to 53% of the country's population lives. The most populous metropolitan area in Mexico is the Metropolitan Area of the Valley of Mexico, or Greater Mexico City, which in 2020 had a population of 21.8 million, or around 18% of the nation's population. The next four largest metropolitan areas in Mexico are Greater Monterrey (5.3 million), Greater Guadalajara (5.2 million), Greater Puebla (3.2 million) and Greater Toluca (2.3 million), whose added population, along with Greater Mexico City, is equivalent to nearly 30% of the nation's population.

Greater Mexico City was the fastest growing metropolitan area in Mexico from the 1930s until the late 1980s. Since then, Mexico has slowly become economically and demographically less centralized. From 2000 to 2005 the average annual growth rate of Greater Mexico City was the lowest of the five largest metropolitan areas. The fastest growing metropolitan area was Puebla (2.0%), followed by Monterrey (1.9%), Toluca (1.8%) and Guadalajara (1.8%).

Largest metropolitan areas in Mexico 2020 National Population Census
Rank	Name	State	Pop.	Rank	Name	State	Pop.
1	Valley of Mexico	Mexico City, State of Mexico, Hidalgo	21,804,515	11	Aguascalientes	Aguascalientes	1,225,432
2	Monterrey	Nuevo León	5,341,171	12	San Luis Potosí	San Luis Potosí	1,221,526
3	Guadalajara	Jalisco	5,286,642	13	Mérida	Yucatán	1,201,000
4	Puebla–Tlaxcala	Puebla, Tlaxcala	3,199,530	14	Mexicali	Baja California	1,049,792
5	Toluca	State of Mexico	2,353,924	15	Saltillo	Coahuila	1,031,779
6	Tijuana	Baja California	2,157,853	16	Cuernavaca	Morelos	1,028,589
7	León	Guanajuato	1,924,771	17	Culiacán	Sinaloa	1,003,530
8	Querétaro	Querétaro	1,594,212	18	Morelia	Michoacán	988,704
9	Juárez	Chihuahua	1,512,450	19	Chihuahua	Chihuahua	988,065
10	La Laguna	Coahuila, Durango	1,434,283	20	Veracruz	Veracruz	939,046

== Other demographic statistics ==
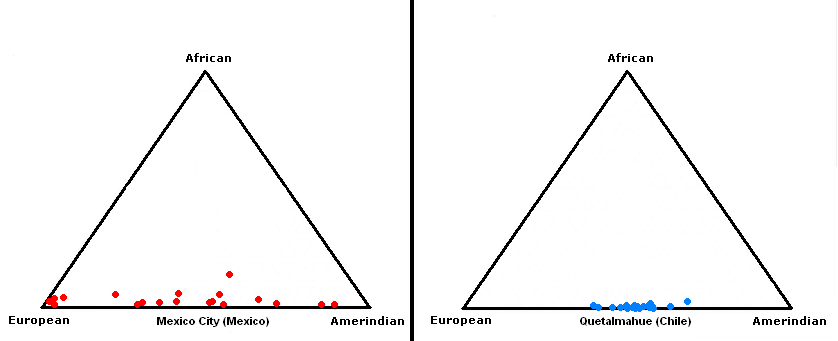
The Mexican mestizo population is the most diverse of all the mestizo groups of Latin America, with its mestizos being either largely European or Amerindian rather than having a uniform admixture. Distribution of Admixture Estimates for Individuals from Mexico City and Quetalmahue, an indigenous community in Chile.

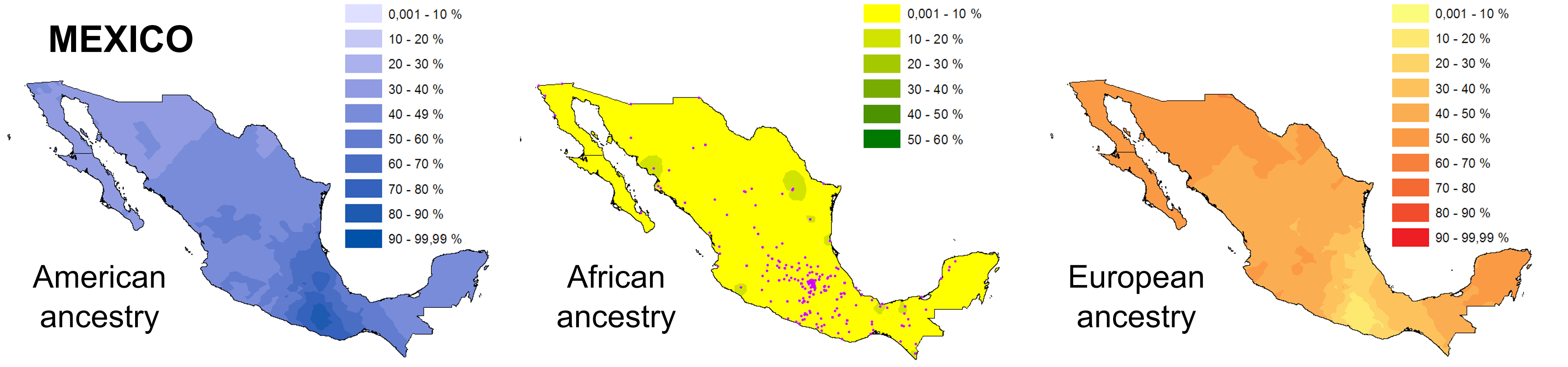
The regional variation of ancestry in 2014. Each dot represents a volunteer, with most coming from south Mexico and Mexico City.

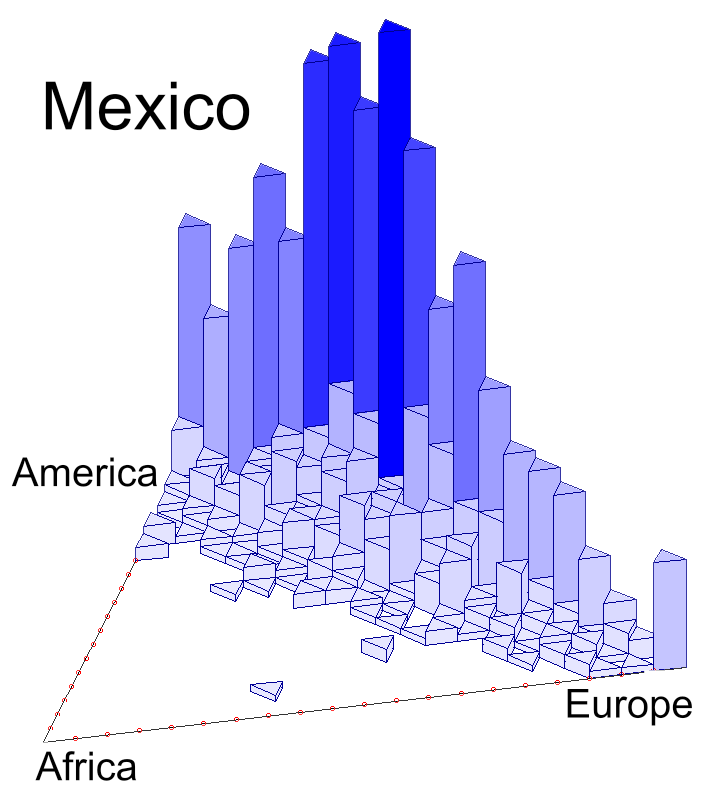
Trivate for ancestry, from the same 2014 study as the image above.

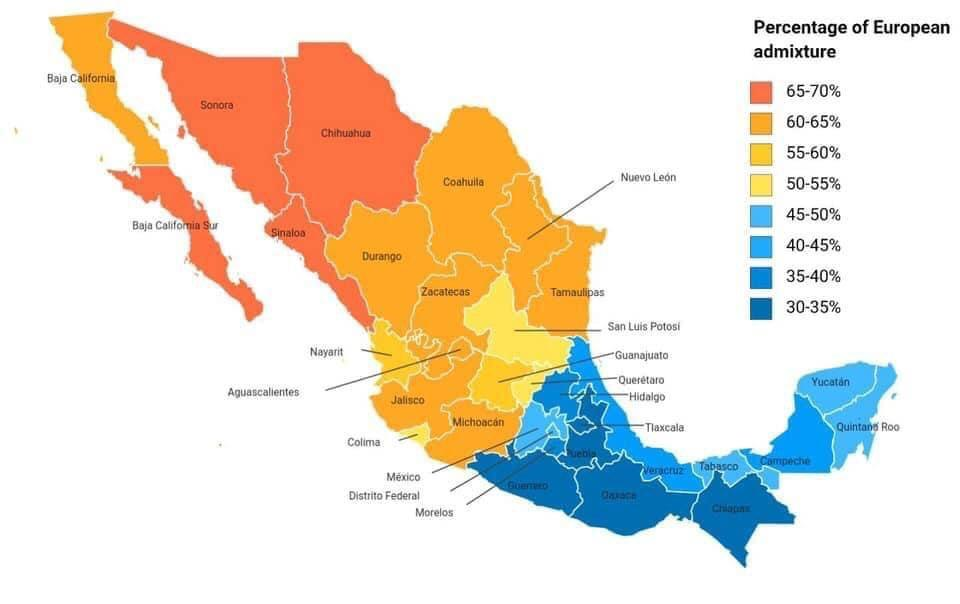
The percentage of European admixture in Mexico, 2024

Demographic statistics according to the CIA World Factbook, unless otherwise indicated.

=== Median age ===
Total: 30.6 years (2023 est.). Country comparison to the world: 130th
Male: 28.2 years
Female: 30.4 years (2020 est.)

=== Contraceptive prevalence rate ===
73.1% (2018)
66.9% (2015)

Prevalence of modern contraceptive use among women of childbearing age, by state
Federal entity	1992	1997	2009	2014	2018	2023
Mexico	55.0	59.4	67.2	68.3	53.4	52.8
Aguascalientes	47.6	51.3	63.4	66.0	48.3	49.8
Baja California	65.0	68.0	75.3	74.1	58.6	55.7
Baja California Sur	73.1	73.6	73.8	73.1	59.8	59.2
Campeche	54.8	59.5	67.8	66.5	52.9	52.3
Coahuila de Zaragoza	68.9	67.7	71.5	71.4	58.2	54.9
Colima	64.7	66.0	71.6	71.3	54.9	57.0
Chiapas	40.1	47.6	51.7	55.6	44.6	45.1
Chihuahua	66.4	69.0	74.3	74.0	58.5	57.6
Ciudad de México	68.6	71.2	74.8	72.8	55.5	55.6
Durango	53.2	60.8	68.8	71.1	55.0	55.6
Guanajuato	41.7	42.2	59.6	61.8	50.9	49.1
Guerrero	40.3	43.5	57.8	63.7	49.8	50.3
Hidalgo	51.2	55.4	65.2	70.5	58.2	55.7
Jalisco	48.8	53.4	63.2	64.4	51.4	49.8
México	64.1	65.2	71.3	73.6	56.2	55.6
Michoacán de Ocampo	45.2	50.7	56.9	62.5	48.3	48.1
Morelos	60.7	65.6	71.3	71.1	55.5	53.1
Nayarit	66.7	69.9	75.2	72.9	56.9	57.6
Nuevo León	66.5	66.1	73.2	69.3	53.3	53.3
Oaxaca	33.6	42.4	59.6	58.9	46.4	47.4
Puebla	40.1	48.1	63.4	68.8	48.9	52.0
Querétaro	43.2	52.1	62.7	67.9	52.9	49.7
Quintana Roo	56.0	58.5	67.4	67.6	54.1	55.2
San Luis Potosí	45.3	52.6	62.9	68.2	51.4	51.6
Sinaloa	67.7	73.3	77.6	76.2	56.1	55.7
Sonora	66.6	70.3	76.1	73.4	59.9	57.9
Tabasco	55.5	57.9	63.4	65.8	52.1	50.9
Tamaulipas	61.6	64.2	69.4	71.1	52.6	52.5
Tlaxcala	47.4	53.5	60.7	70.0	54.7	55.0
Veracruz de Ignacio de la Llave	52.9	61.2	70.4	66.1	56.4	52.8
Yucatán	44.9	52.8	61.1	64.2	49.8	52.7
Zacatecas	48.5	59.6	64.5	65.3	50.0	50.9

=== Mother's mean age at first birth ===
21.3 years (2008 est.)

=== Major infectious diseases ===
degree of risk: intermediate (2020)
food or waterborne diseases: bacterial diarrhea and hepatitis A
vectorborne diseases: dengue fever

Note: a new coronavirus is causing sustained community spread of respiratory illness (COVID-19) in Mexico; sustained community spread means that people have been infected with the virus, but how or where they became infected is not known, and the spread is ongoing; illness with this virus has ranged from mild to severe with fatalities reported; as of June 6, 2022, Mexico has reported a total of 5,782,405 cases of COVID-19 or 4,484.8 cumulative cases of COVID-19 per 100,000 population with a total of 324,966 cumulative deaths or a rate of 252 cumulative deaths per 100,000 population; as of May 20, 2022, 66.68% of the population has received at least one dose of COVID-19 vaccine.

=== Dependency ratios ===
total dependency ratio: 51.4 (2015 est.)
youth dependency ratio: 41.6 (2015 est.)
elderly dependency ratio: 9.8 (2015 est.)
potential support ratio: 10.2 (2015 est.)

=== Urbanization ===
urban population: 81.3% of total population (2022)
rate of urbanization: 1.4% annual rate of change (2020–25 est.)

urban population: 80.2% of total population (2018)
rate of urbanization: 1.59% annual rate of change (2015–20 est.)

=== Obesity – adult prevalence rate ===
28.9% (2016) Country comparison to the world: 29th

=== Children under the age of 5 years underweight ===
4.7% (2018/19) Country comparison to the world: 80th
4.2% (2016) Country comparison to the world: 87th

=== Education expenditures ===
4.3% of GDP (2018) Country comparison to the world: 92nd
5.2% of GDP (2015) Country comparison to the world: 59th

=== Literacy ===
definition: age 15 and over can read and write (2016 est.)

total population: 95.2%
male: 96.1%
female: 94.5% (2020)

=== School life expectancy (primary to tertiary education) ===
total: 15 years
male: 15 years
female: 15 years (2019)

=== Unemployment, youth ages 15–24 ===
total: 8.1%
male: 7.8%
female: 8.7% (2020 est.)

== Ethnic groups ==
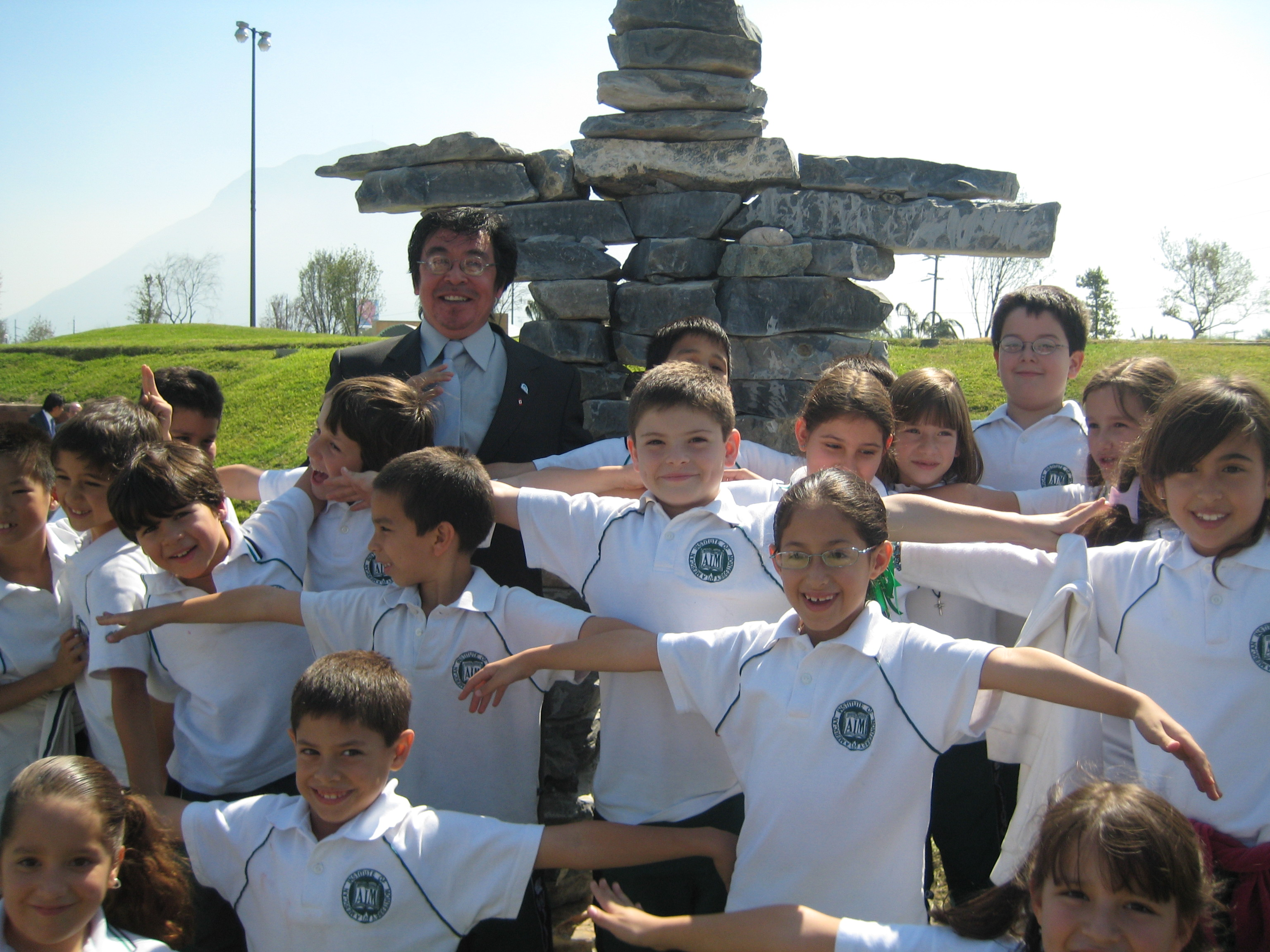
Children from the American Institute school in Monterrey mimic the pose of Inuk artist Bill Nasogaluak's Inukshuk.

Although Mexico is an ethnically diverse country, for most of the 20th century and early 21st century the Mexican government has not conducted surveys regarding the ethnic origin of the population, except for indigenous peoples. However, recently the Mexican National Institute of Statistics and Geography has begun conducting surveys to quantify the percentage of Afro-descendant Mexicans, as well as Euro-descendant Mexicans living in the country. However, the results of surveys on the population of Euro-descendants has never been published.

Mexican national identity is the product of an ideology promoted by Mexican academics such as Manuel Gamio and José Vasconcelos known as mestizaje, whose goal was that of Mexico becoming a racially and culturally homogeneous country. The ideology influenced Mexico's national census of 1921, which was Mexico's first post-colonial national census that considered race. In that census, approximately 60% of Mexico's population identified as Mestizos. Subsequent censuses dropped racial categorization, instead favoring language-based categorization.

Mexico does not have a dominant ethnic group at the national level since many areas have different ethnic groups in majority and minority. For example, in the central regions where large Mesoamerican cultures flourished, and where there was a great fusion between Spaniards and Amerindians, a mostly balanced mestizaje is noted, while in the more rural southern regions, Amerindian ancestry predominates, while in the northern and western regions of the country, the population is predominantly of European ancestry. Each region of the Mexican territory is different in society, culture and traditions.

Some historians and academics have disputed the accuracy of past census results on ethnicity, saying that in its efforts to homogenize Mexico, the government inflated the Mestizo label's percentage by over-classifying people as such regardless actual ancestry.

The term mestizo since 1930 refers to a cultural identity as well as a racial identity. Mexicans who did not speak indigenous languages were classified as mestizos by the government, so under this definition it is possible for a Mexican to be simultaneously "culturally" mestizo and "racially" indigenous, white, black etc. Traditionally, Mexico has defined itself as a multicultural nation or as José Vasconcelos (1925) said, the "melting pot of all races" both culturally and ethnically.

Maps of ethnic groups in Mexico (2020 census)

Indigenous Mexicans

Black Mexicans

=== Mestizo Mexicans ===
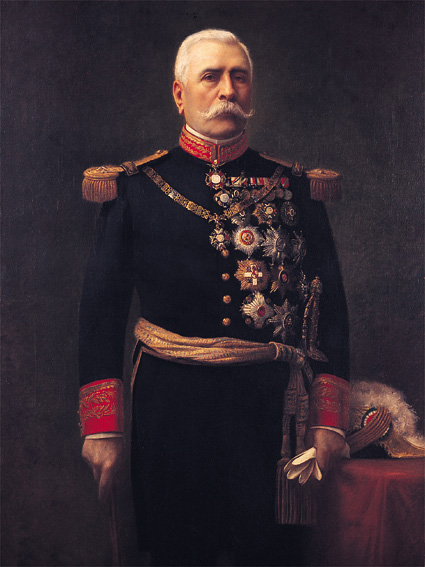
President Porfirio Diaz was of Mestizo descent.

A large majority of Mexicans have been classified as "Mestizos", meaning in modern Mexican usage that they neither identify fully with any indigenous culture nor with a Spanish cultural heritage, but rather identify as having cultural traits incorporating elements from both indigenous and Spanish traditions. By the deliberate efforts of post-revolutionary governments, the "Mestizo identity" was constructed as the base of the modern Mexican national identity, through a process of cultural synthesis referred to as mestizaje [mestiˈsaxe]. Mexican politicians and reformers such as José Vasconcelos and Manuel Gamio were instrumental in building a Mexican national identity upon this concept, which were designed with the main goal of "helping" indigenous peoples to achieve the same level of progress as the rest of society by transforming indigenous communities into Mestizo ones, eventually assimilating them into the Mestizo Mexican society.

According to many 20th- and 21st-century academics, large scale intermixing between the European immigrants and the native Indigenous peoples would result in Mestizos making up the vast majority of Mexico's population by the time of the Mexican Revolution. However, this claim is contested, as church registers from the colonial times show that the majority of Spanish men married with Spanish women. Said registers also put in question other assumptions held by contemporary academics, such as the claim that European immigrants who arrived to Mexico were almost exclusively men, or that "pure Spanish" people were part of a small powerful elite, as Spaniards were often the most numerous ethnic group in the colonial cities and there were menial workers and people in poverty who were of complete Spanish origin.

As the Mestizo identity promoted by the government is more of a cultural identity, it has achieved a strong influence in the country and has caused many people who may not qualify as "Mestizos" in its original sense to be counted as such in Mexico's demographic investigations and censuses, with many people who may be considered "White" being historically classified as Mestizos. A similar situation occurs regarding the distinctions between Indigenous peoples and Mestizos: while the term Mestizo is sometimes used in English with the meaning of a person with mixed indigenous and European blood, In Mexican society an indigenous person can be considered mestizo. and a person with none or a very low percentage of indigenous genetic heritage would be considered fully indigenous either by speaking an indigenous language or by identifying with a particular indigenous cultural heritage. In certain areas of Mexico the word Mestizo has a different meaning: in the Yucatán peninsula it has been used to refer to the Maya-speaking populations living in traditional communities, because during the caste war of the late 19th century those Maya who did not join the rebellion were classified as Mestizos whereas in the state of Chiapas the word "Ladino" is used instead of "mestizo".

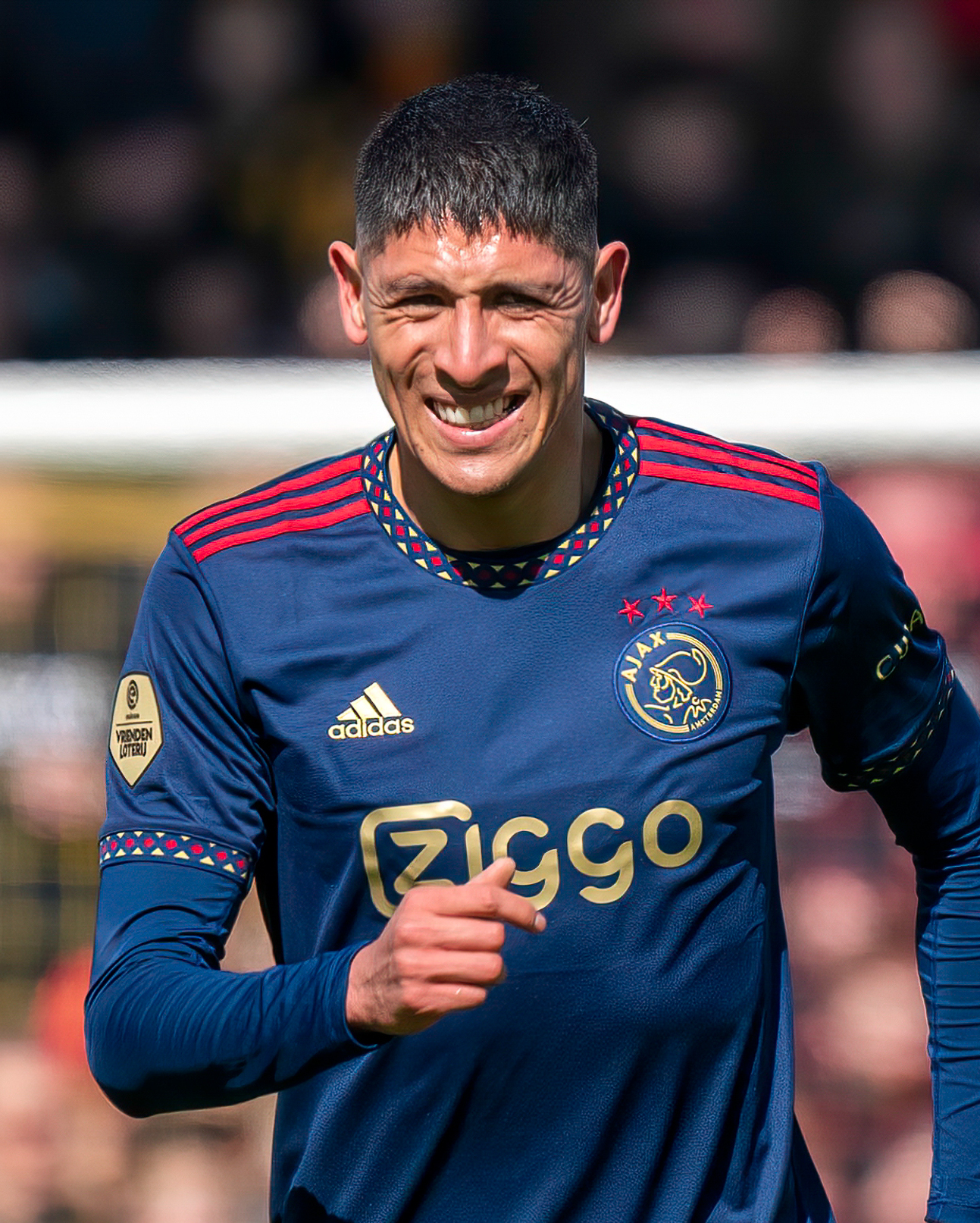
Edson Álvarez, Mexican football player.

Given that the word Mestizo has different meanings in Mexico, estimates of the Mexican Mestizo population vary widely. According to the Encyclopædia Britannica, around three-fifths of the Mexican population is Mestizo. The word "Mestizo" has pejorative connotations, which complicates attempts to quantify Mestizos via self-identification. Research based on self-identification has observed that many Mexicans do not identify as mestizos.

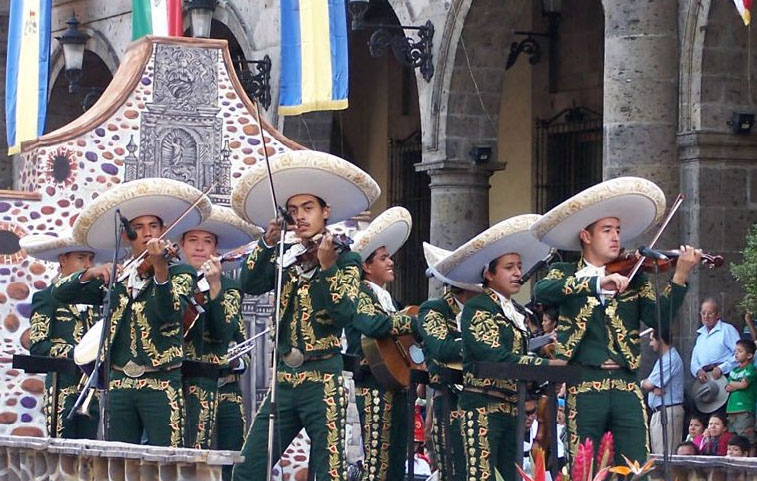
A group of mariachi musicians in Guadalajara, Jalisco.

The use of variated methods and criteria to quantify the number of Mestizos in Mexico is not new: Since several decades ago, many authors have analyzed colonial censuses data and have made different conclusions regarding the ethnic composition of the population of colonial Mexico/New Spain. Some historians, such as Gonzalo Aguirre-Beltrán who claimed in 1972 that practically the totality of New Spain's population, in reality, were Mestizos, using to back up his claims arguments such as that affairs of Spaniards with non-Europeans due to the alleged absence of female European immigrants were widespread as well as there being a huge desire of Mestizos to "pass" as Spaniards, this because Spanishness was seen as a symbol of high status.

Other historians, however, argue that Aguirre-Beltran's numbers tend to have inconsistencies and take too many liberties (it is pointed out in the book Ensayos sobre historia de la población. México y el Caribe 2 published in 1998 that on 1646, when according to historic registers the mestizo population was of 1% he estimates it to be 16.6% already, with this being attributed to him interpreting the data in a way convenient for a historic narrative), often omitting data of New Spain's northern and western provinces. His self-made classifications thus, although could be plausible, are not useful for precise statistical analysis.

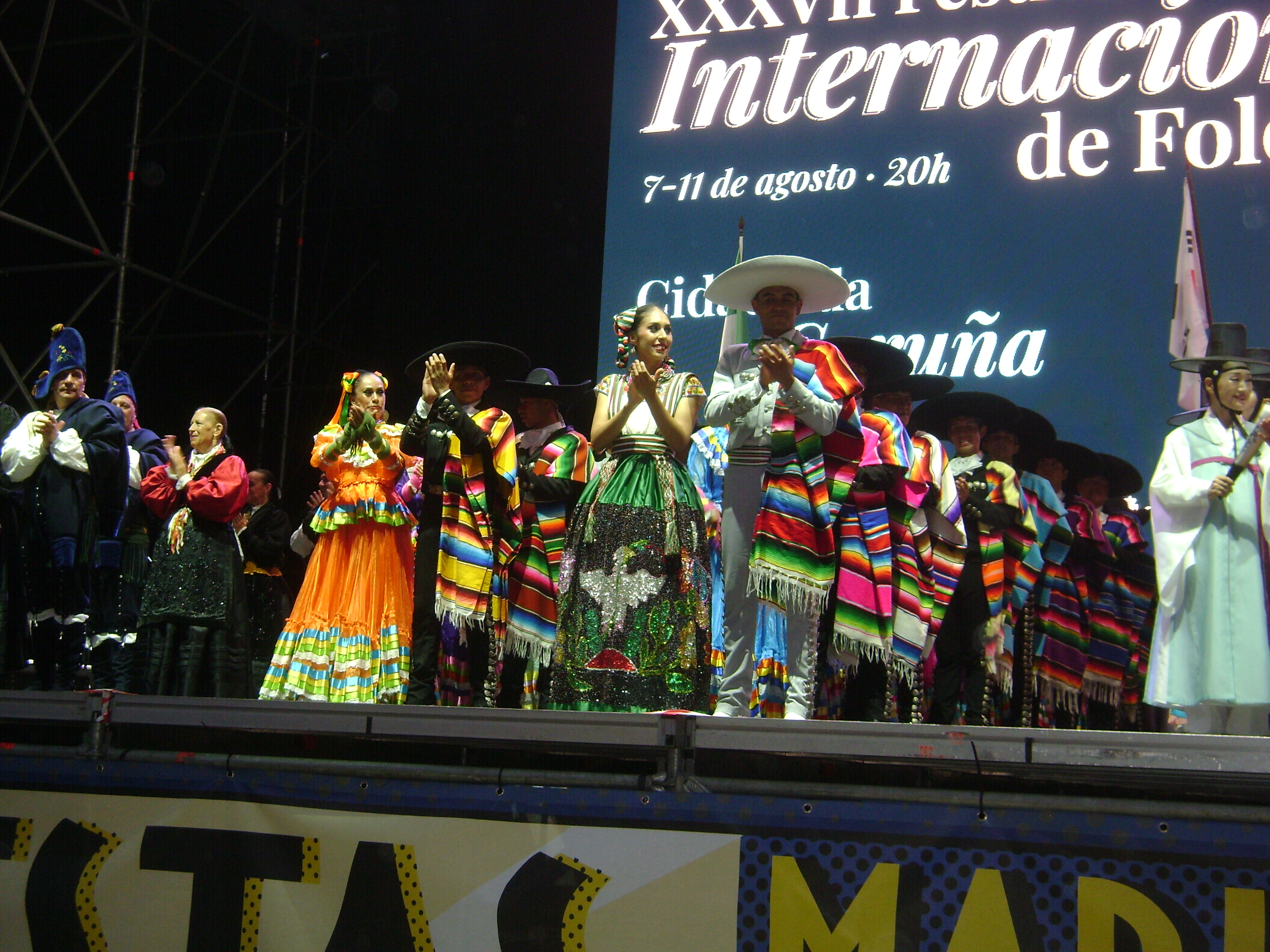
Mexican folklore in La Coruña, Galicia, (Spain).

According to some 21st-century historians, Aguirre Beltran also disregards facts such as the population dynamics of New Spain being different depending on the region at hand (i.e. miscegenation could not happen in a significant amount in regions where the native population was openly hostile until the early 20th century, such as most of New Spain's internal provinces, which nowadays are the northern and western regions of Mexico), or that historic accounts made by investigators at the time consistently observed that New Spain's European population was notoriously concerned with preserving their European heritage, with practices such as inviting relatives and friends directly from Spain or favoring Europeans for marriage even if they were from a lower socioeconomic level than them being common. Newer publications that do cite Aguirre-Beltran's work take those factors into consideration, stating that the Spaniard/Euromestizo/Criollo ethnic label was composed on its majority by descendants of Europeans, albeit the category may have included people with some non-European ancestry.

=== Indigenous peoples ===
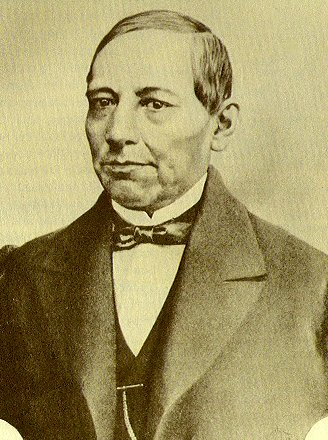
President Benito Juarez was of Zapotec ancestry. He became the first Amerindian president in the Americas.

The 2003 General Law of Linguistic Rights of the Indigenous Peoples recognizes 62 indigenous languages as "national languages" which have the same validity as Spanish in all territories in which they are spoken. The recognition of indigenous languages and the protection of indigenous cultures is granted not only to the ethnic groups indigenous to modern-day Mexican territory, but also to other North American indigenous groups that migrated to Mexico from the United States, such as the Kikapú in the 19th century and those who immigrated from Guatemala in the 1980s. The category of "indígena" (indigenous) in Mexico has been defined based on different criteria throughout history. This means that the percentage of the Mexican population defined as "indigenous" varies according to the definition applied.

The latest intercensal survey carried out by the Mexican government in 2015 reports that Indigenous people make up 21.5% of Mexico's population, including both those who self-identified as "Indigenous" and people who self-identified as "partially Indigenous". According to the 2020 national Mexican census, 19.4% of the population self-identified as Indigenous. The number of people who speak an Indigenous language is significantly less than the total population of self-identified Indigenous people. Approximately 6.1% of the population speaks an Indigenous language, while 11.8 million people, or 9.36% of the population, live in what is designated as "Indigenous households" (households where at least one person spoke an indigenous language). However, activists for the rights of Indigenous Mexicans have referred to the usage of linguistic criterion, rather than self identification, as "statistical genocide."

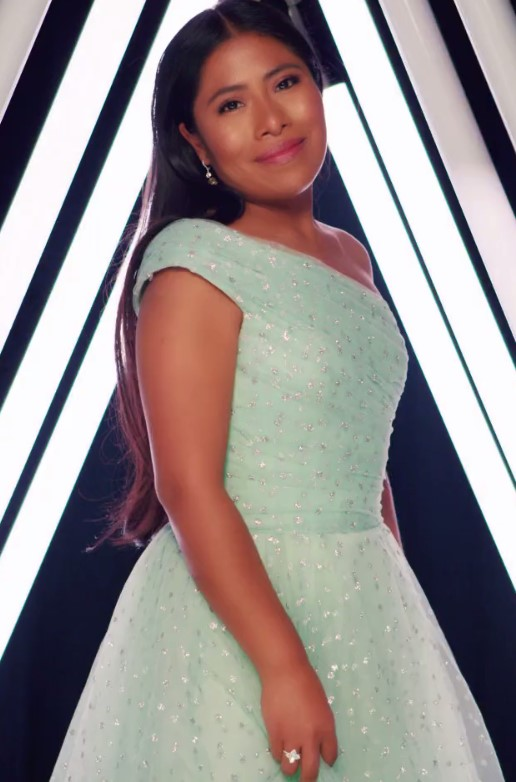
Actress Yalitza Aparicio, daughter of a Mixtec father and Triqui mother.

Surveys made by the Mexican government do count as Indigenous all persons who speak an indigenous language and people who do not speak indigenous languages nor live in indigenous communities but self-identify as Indigenous. According to these criteria, the National Commission for the Development of Indigenous Peoples (Comisión Nacional para el Desarrollo de los Pueblos Indígenas, or CDI in Spanish) and the INEGI (Mexico's National Institute of Statistics and Geography), state that there are 15.7 million indigenous people in Mexico of many different ethnic groups, which constitute 14.9% of the population in the country, with 1.2% not fluent in Spanish. The states with the greatest percentage of people who speak an Amerindian language or identify as Amerindian are Yucatán (59%), Oaxaca (48%), Quintana Roo (39%), Chiapas (28%), Campeche (27%), Hidalgo (24%), Puebla (19%), Guerrero (17%), San Luis Potosí (15%) and Veracruz (15%). Oaxaca is the state with the greatest number of distinct indigenous peoples and languages in the country.

Largest indigenous peoples
Group	Number
Nahua peoples (Nawatlaka)	2,445,969
Yucatec Maya (Maayatʼaan)	1,475,575
Zapotec (Binizaa)	777,253
Mixtec (Ñuu sávi)	726,601
Otomí (Hñähñü)	646,875
Totonac (Tachihuiin)	411,266

% Indigenous (Note: Percentage of population aged 3 years or older)
State	Percentage
Between 50% and 100%
Oaxaca	69.2%
Yucatán	65.2%
Between 20% and 50%
Campeche	47.3%
Chiapas	36.8%
(Hidalgo (state)) Hidalgo	36.7%
Quintana Roo	33.2%
Puebla	33.2%
Guerrero	33.1%
Veracruz	26.9%
Morelos	24.5%
Tabasco	21.4%
Michoacán	20.8%
San Luis Potosí	20.3%
Between 10% and 20%
Mexico	19.4%
Tlaxcala	16.5%
Nayarit	15.9%
(State of Mexico) Mexico	15.7%
Sonora	13.3%
Colima	13.2%
Querétaro	13.2%
Baja California Sur	11.9%
(Chihuahua (state)) Chihuahua	10.5%
Between 5% and 10%
Sinaloa	9.4%
Mexico City	9.3%
Durango	8.9%
Baja California	8.0%
Jalisco	7.0%
Tamaulipas	6.7%
Nuevo León	6.4%
Guanajuato	6.4%
Aguascalientes	6.2%
Between 0% and 5%
Zacatecas	4.9%
Coahuila	2.1%
Source: Mexican census 2020 INEGI.

=== White Mexicans ===
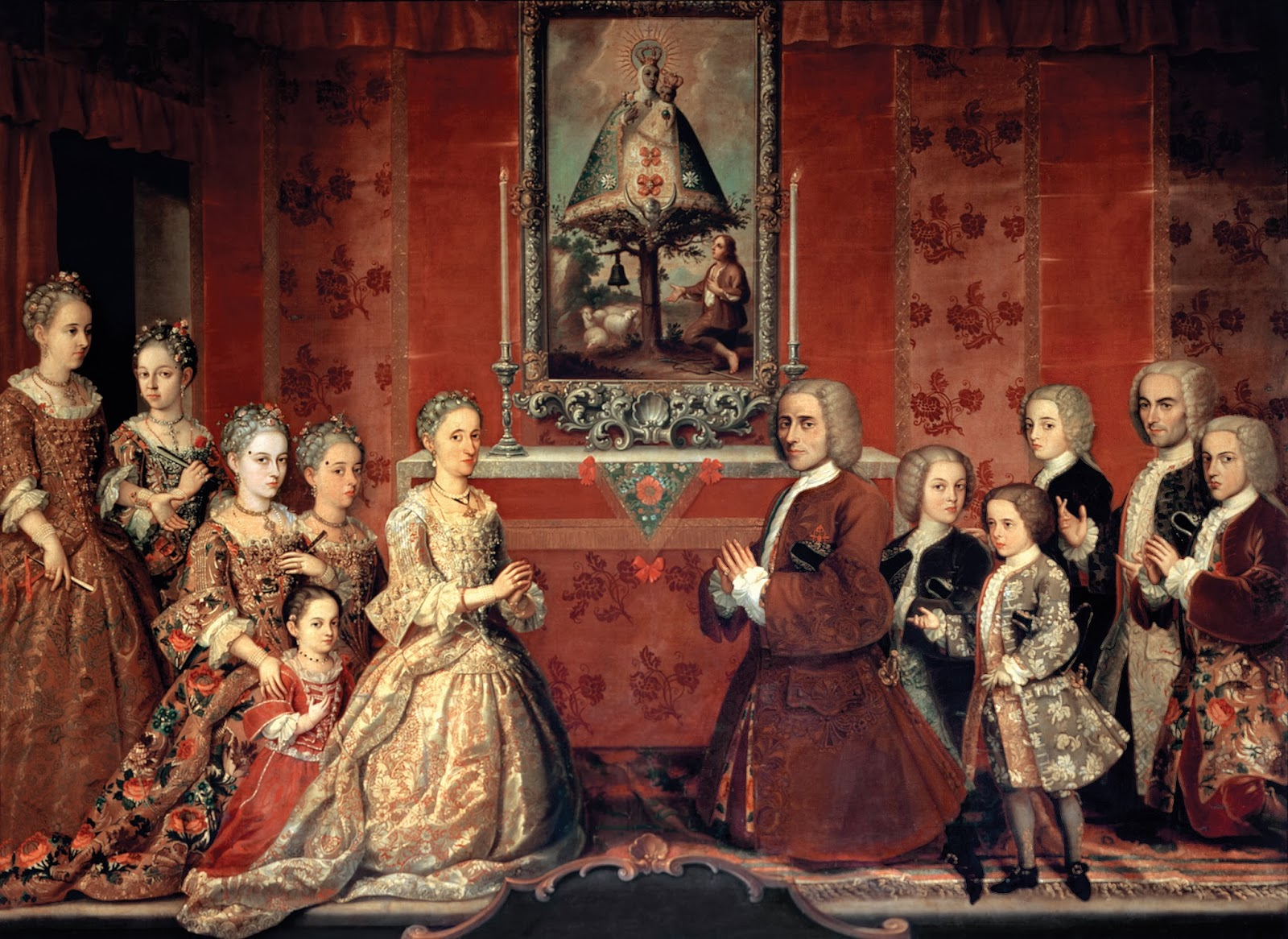
An 18th-century portrait of the Fagoaga Arozqueta family, an upper-class family of Basque descent from Mexico City.

White Mexicans are Mexicans of total or predominantly European ancestry. Spaniards and other Europeans began arriving in Mexico during the Spanish conquest of the Aztec Empire.

The Mexican government conducts surveys of skin color, but does not publish census results for ethnic identity. Estimates of Mexico's white population differ greatly in methodology, definition, and percentages given. The World Factbook give an approximation of about 10% as of 2017, while Britannica listed 15% in 2000.

The majority of the first waves of European immigration to Mexico was from Spain, starting with the colonization of America. A subsequent wave of Spanish immigration coincided with the Spanish Civil War of 1937. During the Second Mexican Empire, immigration was mostly French. In the late 19th and early 20th centuries, spurred by government policies of Porfirio Díaz, migrants came mainly from Italy, Germany, the United Kingdom, and Ireland. Most settled in Mexico City, Veracruz, Yucatán, and Puebla. Significant numbers of German immigrants also arrived during and after the First and Second World Wars. Additionally, small numbers of White Americans, Croats, Greeks, Poles, Romanians, Russians, and Ashkenazi Jews came. European Jewish immigrants joined the Sephardic community that lived in Mexico since colonial times, though many lived as Crypto-Jews, mostly in the northern states of Nuevo León and Tamaulipas.

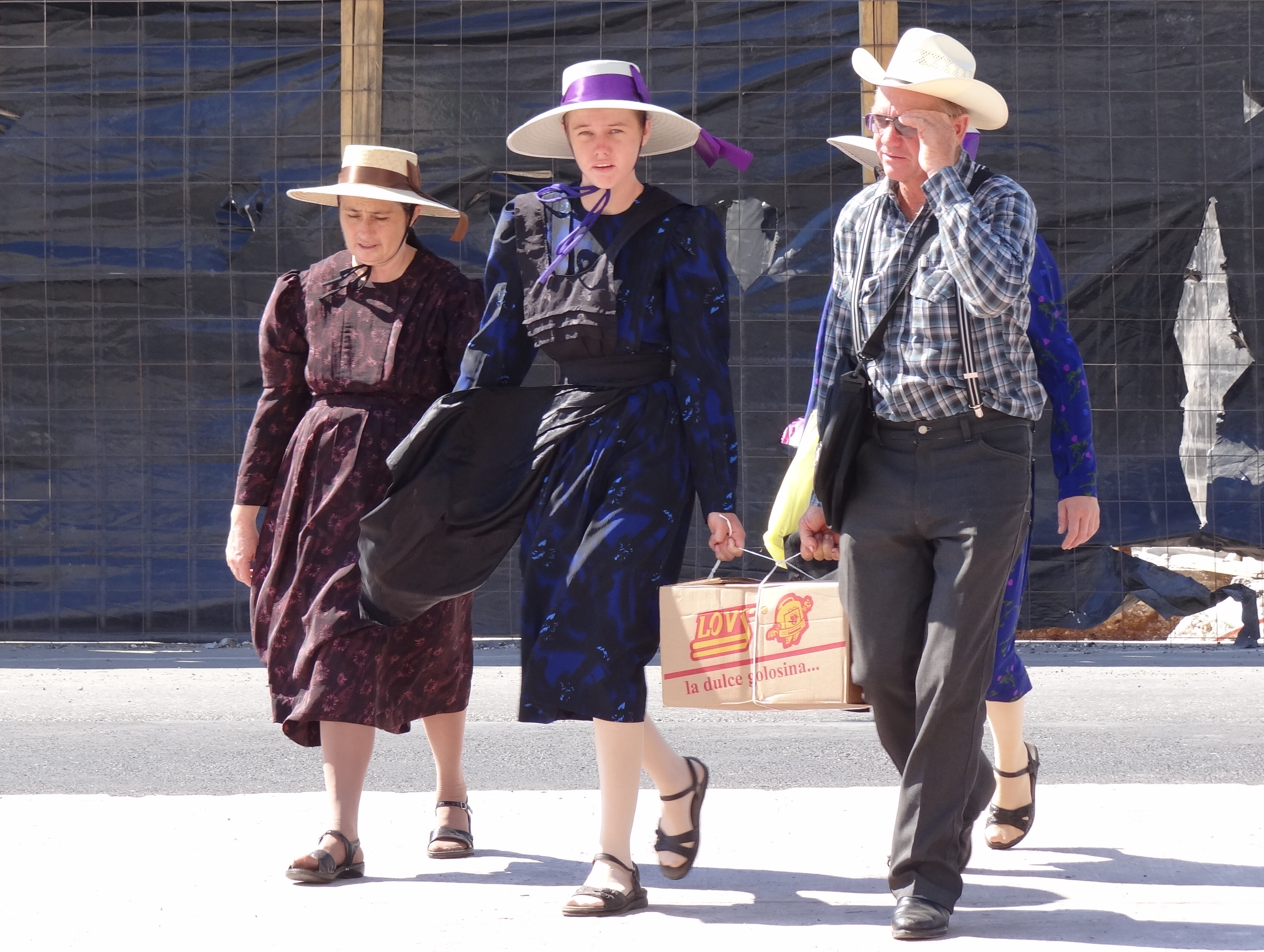
A Mennonite family in Campeche.

Some communities of European immigrants have remained isolated from the rest of the general population since their arrival, among them the German-speaking Mennonites from Russia of Chihuahua and Durango, and the Venetos of Chipilo, Puebla, which have retained their original languages.

=== Afro-Mexicans ===
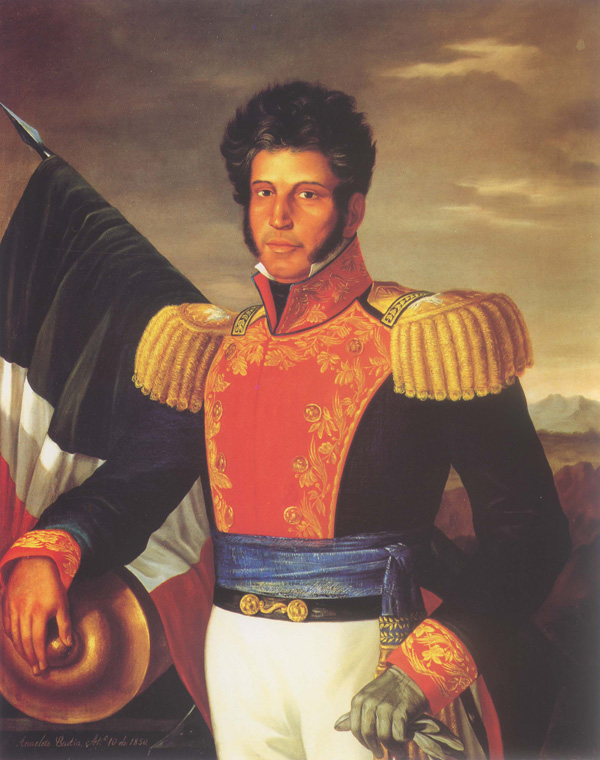
Vicente Guerrero, major figure during the late Mexican War of Independence and second President of Mexico, was an Afro-descendent. His father was Mestizo and his mother was Black.

Afro-Mexicans are an ethnic group that predominate in certain areas of Mexico such as the Costa Chica of Oaxaca and the Costa Chica of Guerrero, Veracruz (e.g. Yanga) and in some towns in northern Mexico, mainly in Múzquiz Municipality, Coahuila. The existence of individuals of Sub-Saharan African descent in Mexico has its origins in the slave trade that took place during colonial times and that did not end until 1829 after the consummation of Mexican independence. The institution was not as prominent as elsewhere in the Americas and was already in decay by the late 1700s, which led to the number of free black people eventually surpassing that of enslaved ones. Although Mexico did not abolish slavery immediately after independence, the expansion of Anglo-American settlement in Texas with their Black slaves became a point of contention between the US and Mexico. The northern territory had been claimed by the Spanish Empire but not settled beyond a few missions. The Mexican government saw a solution to the problem of Indian attacks in the north by inviting immigration by US Americans. Rather than settling in the territory contested by northern Indian groups, the Anglo-Americans and their Black slaves established farming in eastern Texas, contiguous to US territory in Louisiana. Mexican President Anastasio Bustamante, concerned that the US would annex Texas, sought to limit Anglo-American immigration in 1830 and mandated no new slaves in the territory.

Historically, the presence of this ethnic group within the country has been difficult to assess for a number of reasons: their small numbers, heavy intermarriage with other ethnic groups, and Mexico's tradition of defining itself as a Mestizo society or mixing of European and indigenous only.

The majority of Mexico's Afro-descendants are Afromestizos, i.e. "mixed-race".According to the intercensal survey carried out in 2015, 1.2% of the population self-identified as Afro-Mexican with 64.9% (896,829) of them also identifying as indigenous and 9.3% being speakers of indigenous languages. In the 2020 INEGI census carried out by the Mexican government, Afro-Mexicans were reported to make up 2.04% of the country's population.

% Afro-Mexican
State	Percentage
Between 5% and 10%
Guerrero	8.6%
Between 2.5% and 5%
Oaxaca	4.7%
Baja California Sur	3.3%
Yucatán	3.0%
Quintana Roo	2.8%
Veracruz	2.7%
Between 0% and 2.5%
Campeche	2.1%
Mexico	2.04%
Mexico City	2.0%
San Luis Potosí	2.0%
(Coahuila) Morelos	1.9%
Colima	1.9%
Querétaro	1.8%
(Guanajuato) Morelos	1.8%
(State of Mexico) México	1.7%
Puebla	1.7%
Baja California	1.7%
Nuevo León	1.7%
Jalisco	1.7%
(Chihuahua (state)) Chihuahua	1.6%
(Hidalgo (state)) Hidalgo	1.6%
Aguascalientes	1.6%
Tabasco	1.6%
Michoacán	1.5%
Sonora	1.5%
Coahuila	1.5%
Sinaloa	1.4%
Tlaxcala	1.3%
Tamaulipas	1.2%
Chiapas	1.0%
Zacatecas	1.0%
Durango	0.9%
Nayarit	0.8%
Source: Mexican census 2020 INEGI.

=== Arab Mexicans ===
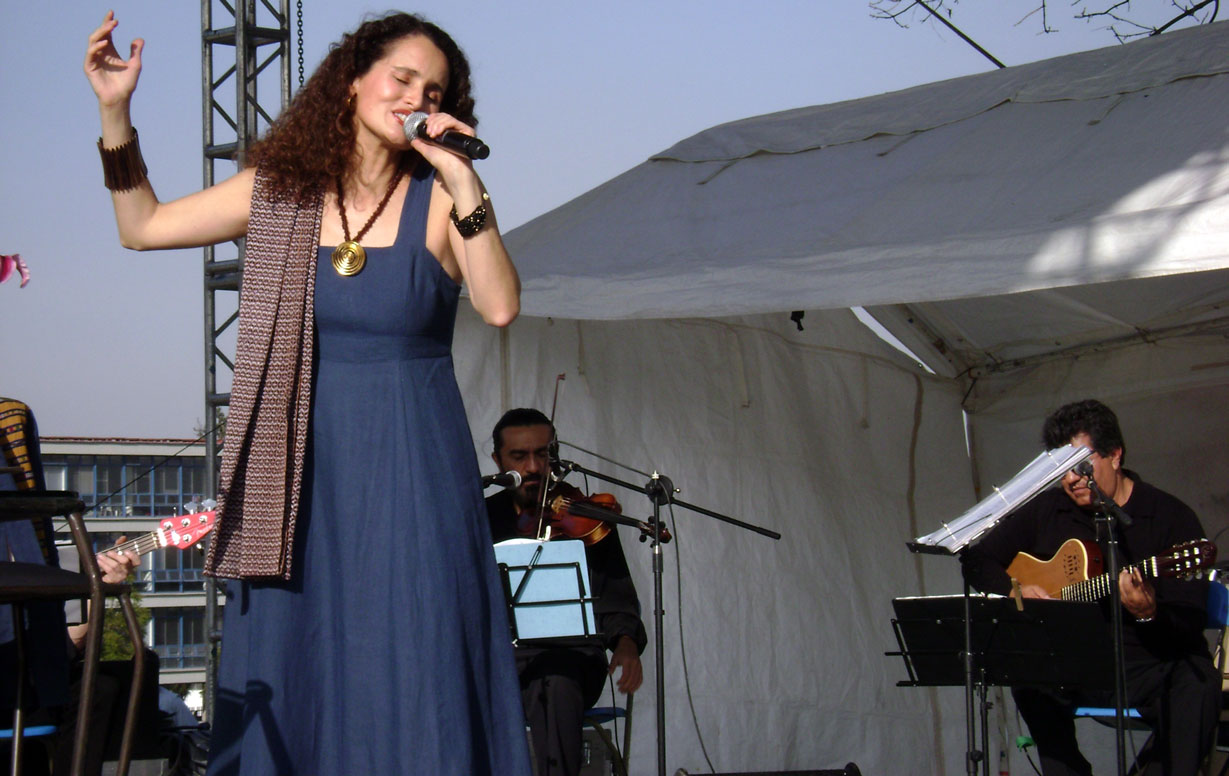
Susana Harp Mexican singer and currently serves as a senator.

An Arab Mexican is a Mexican citizen of Arabic-speaking origin who can be of various ancestral origins. The vast majority of Mexico's 1.1 million Arabs are from either Lebanese, Syrian, or Palestinian background. Immigration of Arabs in Mexico has influenced Mexican culture, in particular food, where they have introduced Kibbeh, Tabbouleh and even created recipes such as Tacos Árabes. By 1765, Dates, which originated from the Middle East, were introduced into Mexico by the Spaniards. The fusion between Arab and Mexican food has highly influenced the Yucatecan cuisine.

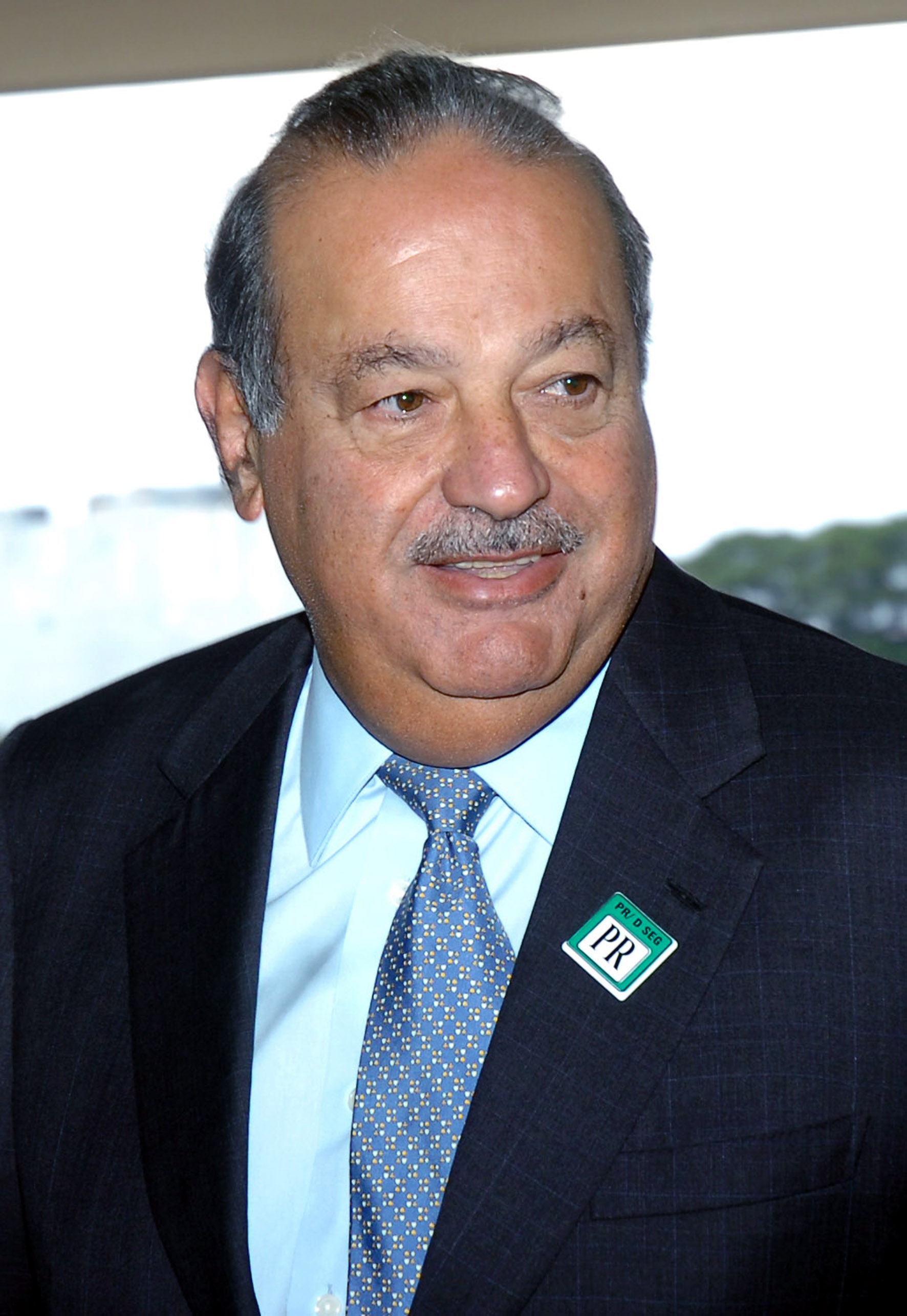
Engineer Carlos Slim

Arab immigration to Mexico started in the 19th and early 20th centuries. Roughly 100,000 Arabic-speakers settled in Mexico during this time period. They came mostly from Lebanon, Syria, Palestine, and Iraq and settled in significant numbers in Nayarit, Puebla, Mexico City and the northern part of the country (mainly in the states of Baja California, Tamaulipas, Nuevo León, Sinaloa, Chihuahua, Coahuila, and Durango, as well as the city of Tampico and Guadalajara. During the 1948 Israel-Lebanon war and the Six-Day War, thousands of Lebanese left Lebanon for Mexico. They first arrived in Veracruz. Although Arabs made up less than 5% of the total immigrant population in Mexico during the 1930s, they constituted half of the immigrant economic activity. Another concentration of Arab-Mexicans is in Baja California facing the U.S.-Mexican border, esp. in cities of Mexicali in the Imperial Valley U.S./Mexico, and Tijuana across from San Diego with a large Arab American community (about 280,000), some of whose families have relatives in Mexico. 45% of Arab Mexicans are of Lebanese descent.

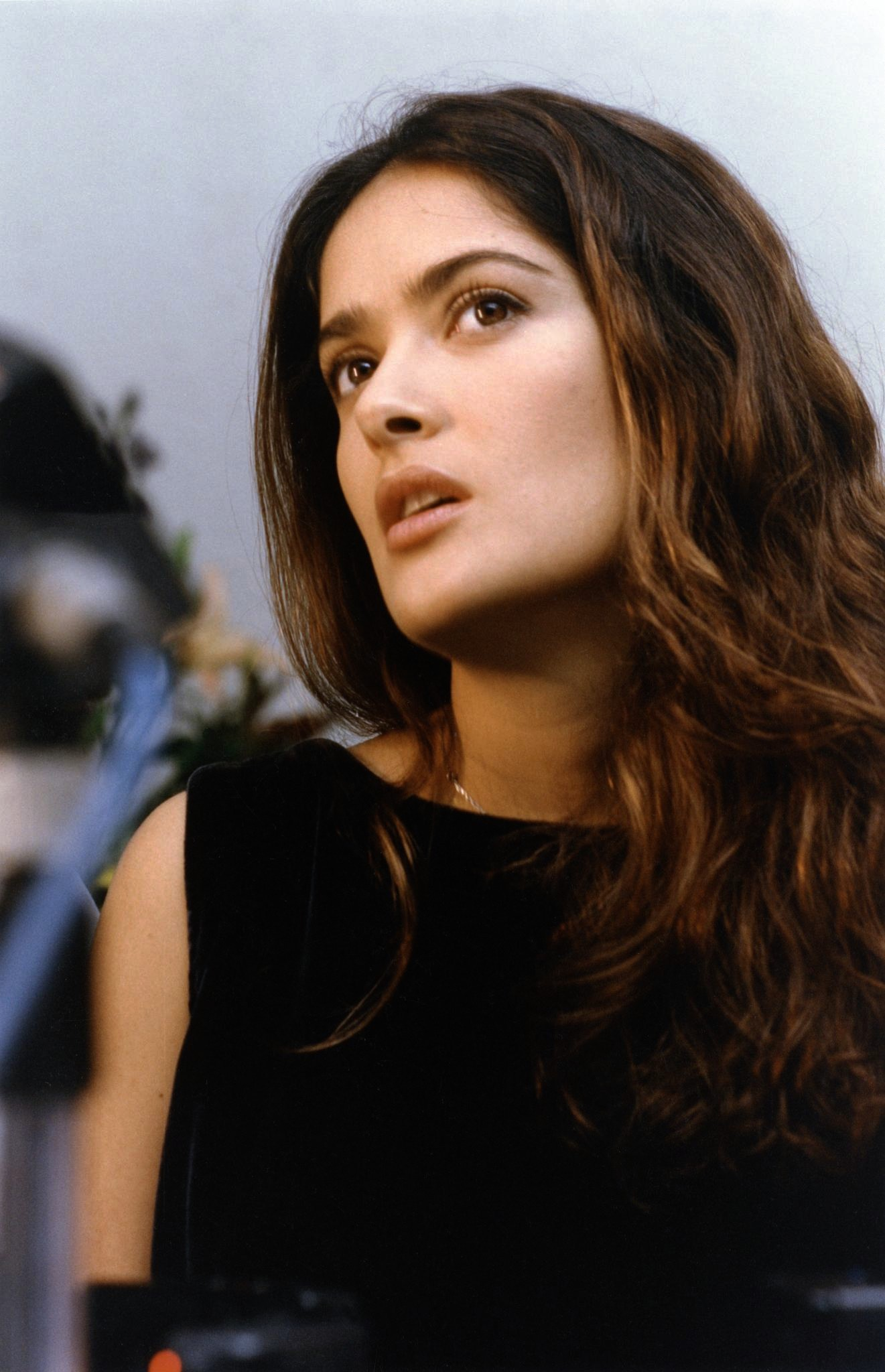
Salma Hayek, actress and film producer.

The majority of Arab-Mexicans are Christians who belong to the Maronite Church, Roman Catholic, Eastern Orthodox and Eastern Rite Catholic Churches and a scant number are Muslims, The term "Arab Mexican" may include ethnic groups that do not in fact identify as Arab. The inter-ethnic marriage in the Arab community, regardless of religious affiliation, is very high; most community members have only one parent of Arab ancestry. As a result, the Arab community in Mexico shows marked language shift away from Arabic. Only a few speak any Arabic, and such knowledge is often limited to a few basic words. Instead, the majority, especially those of younger generations, speak Spanish as a first language. Today, the most common Arabic surnames in Mexico include Nader, Hayek, Ali, Haddad, Nasser, Malik, Abed, Mansoor, Harb, and Elias.

=== Asian Mexicans ===
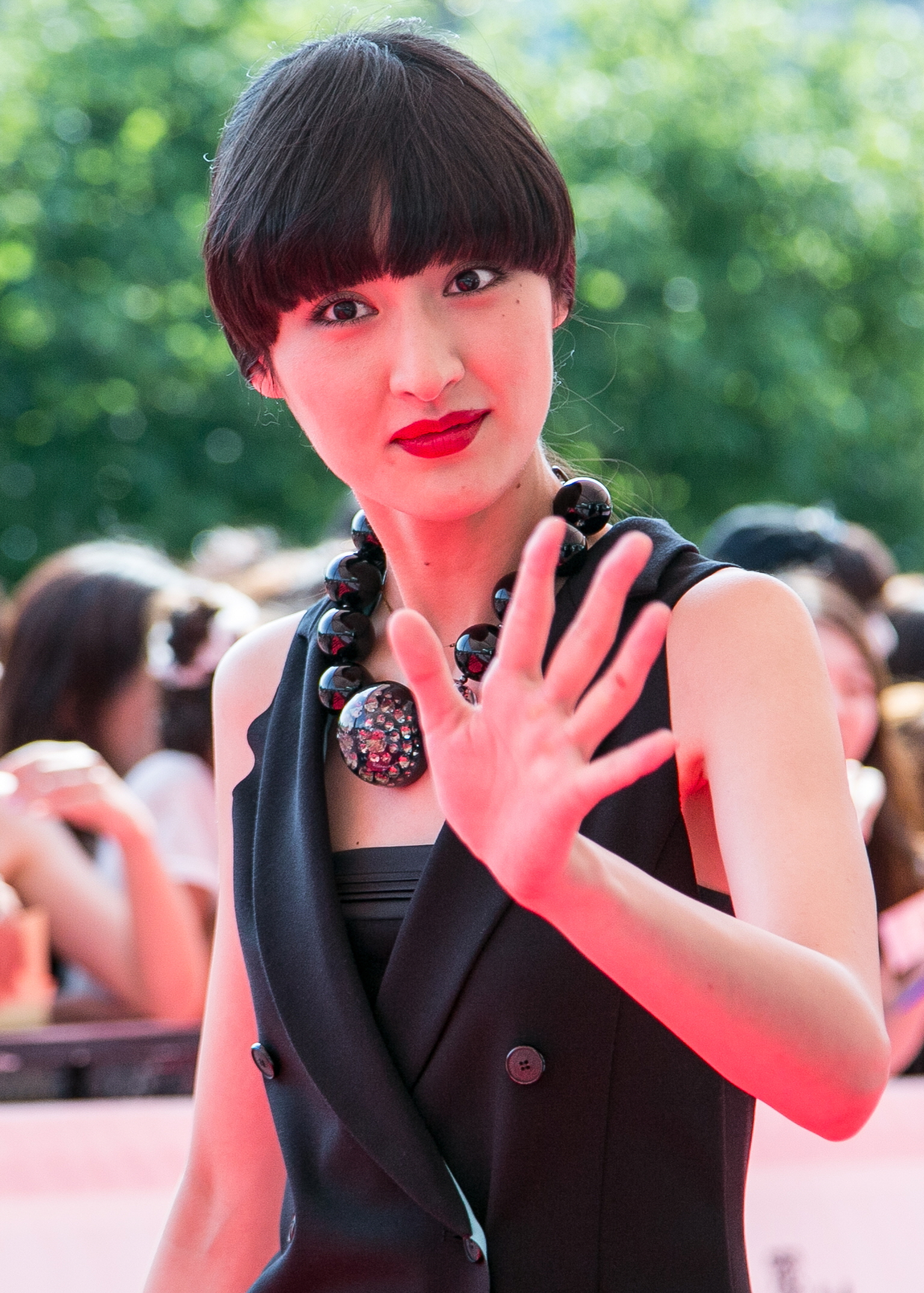
Kavka Shishido, drummer and vocalist.

Although Asian Mexicans make up less than 1% of the total population of modern Mexico, they are nonetheless a notable minority. Due to the historical and contemporary perception in Mexican society of what constitutes Asian culture (associated with the Far East rather than the Near East), Asian Mexicans typically refers to those of East Asian descent, and may also include those of South and Southeast Asian descent while Mexicans of West Asian descent are referred to as Arab Mexicans.

Asian immigration began with the arrival of Filipinos to Mexico during the colonial period. For two and a half centuries, between 1565 and 1815, many Filipinos and Mexicans sailed back and forth between Mexico and the Philippines as crews, prisoners, adventurers and soldiers in the Manila-Acapulco Galleon assisting Spain in its trade between Asia and the Americas. Also, on these voyages, thousands of Asian individuals (mostly males) were brought to Mexico as slaves and were called "Chino", which means Chinese, although in reality they were of diverse origins, including Koreans, Japanese, Malays, Filipinos, Javanese, Cambodians, Timorese, and people from Bengal, India, Ceylon, Makassar, Tidore, Terenate, and China. A notable example is the story of Catarina de San Juan (Mirra), an Indian girl captured by the Portuguese and sold into slavery in Manila. She arrived in New Spain and eventually she gave rise to the "China Poblana".

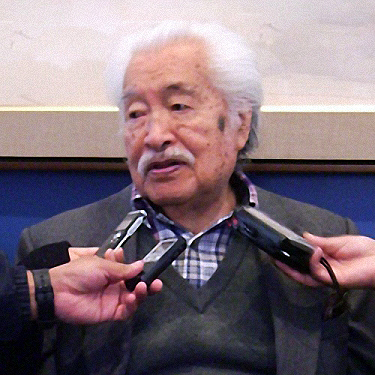
Luis Nishizawa was a Mexican artist.

These early individuals are not very apparent in modern Mexico for two main reasons: the widespread mestizaje of Mexico during the Spanish period and the common practice of Chino slaves to "pass" as Indios (the indigenous people of Mexico) to attain freedom. As had occurred with a large portion of Mexico's black population, over generations the Asian populace was absorbed into the general Mestizo population. Facilitating this miscegenation was the assimilation of Asians into the indigenous population. The indigenous people were legally protected from chattel slavery, and by being recognized as part of this group, Asian slaves could claim they were wrongly enslaved.

Asians, predominantly Chinese, became Mexico's fastest-growing immigrant group from the 1880s to the 1920s, exploding from about 1,500 in 1895 to more than 20,000 in 1910.

=== Romani Mexicans ===
Romani people have settled in Mexico since the colonial era. There are around 50,000 Vlax Romani in Mexico.

=== Official censuses ===
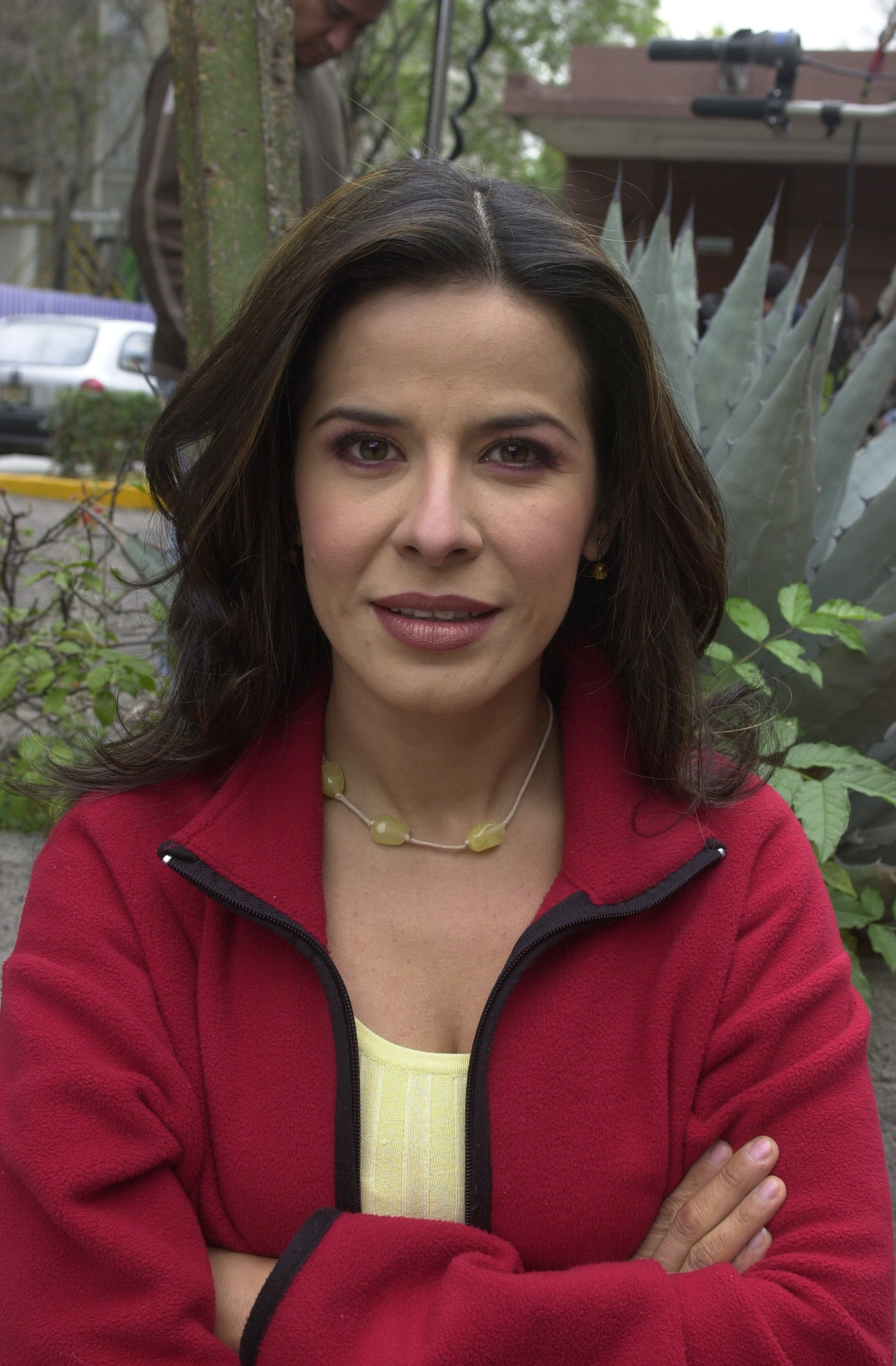
Arcelia Ramírez Mexican actress

Historically, population studies and censuses have never been up to the standards that a population as diverse and numerous such as Mexico's require: the first racial census was made in 1793, being also Mexico's (then known as New Spain) first ever nationwide population census. Since only part of its original datasets survive, most of what is known of it comes from essays made by researchers who back in the day used the census' findings as reference for their own works.

More than a century would pass until the Mexican government conducted a new racial census in 1921 (some sources assert that the census of 1895 included a comprehensive racial classification; however, according to the historic archives of Mexico's National Institute of Statistics, that was not the case). While the 1921 census was the last time the Mexican government conducted a census that included a comprehensive racial classification, in recent years it has conducted nationwide surveys to quantify most of the ethnic groups who inhabit the country as well as the social dynamics and inequalities between them.

==== 1793 census ====
Also known as the "Revillagigedo census" from the name of the Count who ordered that it be conducted, this census was the first nationwide population census of Mexico (then known as the Viceroyalty of New Spain). Most of its original datasets have reportedly been lost, so most of what is known about it nowadays comes from essays and field investigations made by academics who had access to the census data and used it as reference for their works, such as Prussian geographer Alexander von Humboldt.

Each author gives different estimations for each racial group in the country although they do not vary greatly, with Europeans ranging from 18% to 22% of New Spain's population, Mestizos from 21% to 25%, Indians from 51% to 61%, and Africans from 6,000 and 10,000. The estimations given for the total population range from 3,799,561 to 6,122,354. It is concluded then, that across nearly three centuries of colonization, the population growth trends of whites and mestizos were even, while the total percentage of the indigenous population decreased at a rate of 13%–17% per century. The authors assert that rather than whites and mestizos having higher birthrates, the reason for the indigenous population's numbers decreasing lies in their suffering higher mortality rates due to living in remote locations rather than in cities and towns founded by the Spanish colonists or in being at war with them. For the same reasons, the number of Indigenous Mexicans presents the greatest variation range between publications, as in some cases their numbers in a given location were estimated rather than counted, leading to possible overestimations in some provinces and possible underestimations in others.

Intendency or territory	Population proportions by category (%)		
Intendency or territory	European	Indigenous	Mestizo
México (only the State of Mexico and Mexico City)	16.9%	66.1%	16.7%
Puebla	10.1%	74.3%	15.3%
Oaxaca	06.3%	88.2%	5.2%
Guanajuato	25.8%	44.0%	29.9%
San Luis Potosí	13.0%	51.2%	35.7%
Zacatecas	15.8%	29.0%	55.1%
Durango	20.2%	36.0%	43.5%
Sonora	28.5%	44.9%	26.4%
Yucatán	14.8%	72.6%	12.3%
Guadalajara	31.7%	33.3%	34.7%
Veracruz	10.4%	74.0%	15.2%
Valladolid	27.6%	42.5%	29.6%
Nuevo México	~	30.8%	69.0%
Vieja California	~	51.7%	47.9%
Nueva California	~	89.9%	9.8%
Coahuila	30.9%	28.9%	40.0%
Nuevo León	62.6%	5.5%	31.6%
Nuevo Santander	25.8%	23.3%	50.8%
Texas	39.7%	27.3%	32.4%
Tlaxcala	13.6%	72.4%	13.8%

~Europeans are included within the Mestizo category.

Percentages may not sum to 100% because ......

Regardless of the possible inaccuracies related to the counting of Indigenous peoples living outside of the colonized areas, the effort that New Spain's authorities put into considering them as subjects is worth mentioning, as censuses made by other colonial or post-colonial countries did not consider American Indians to be citizens or subjects; for example, the censuses made by the Viceroyalty of the Río de la Plata would only count the inhabitants of the colonized settlements. Another example is the censuses made by the United States, which did not include Indigenous peoples living among the general population until 1860, and indigenous peoples as a whole until 1900.

==== 1921 census ====
Racial groups in Mexico (1921 census)
1. Mestizos (59.3%)
2. Indigenous (29.2%)
3. Whites (9.80%)
4. Other groups (1.00%)
5. Foreigners (0.71%)

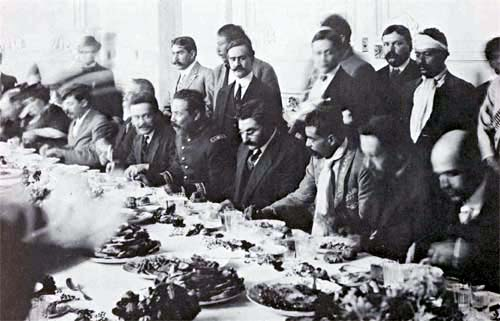
Eulalio Gutiérrez (1881–1939), flanked by Francisco "Pancho" Villa (1878–1923) and Emiliano Zapata (1879–1919). Gutiérrez was appointed provisional President of Mexico by the Convention of Aguascalientes, a move that Venustiano Carranza (1859–1920) found intolerable. In the ensuing war, Obregón fought for Carranza against the convention.

The 1921 census was made right after the end of the Mexican revolution. The 1921 census' reported that 59.33% of the Mexican population self-identified as Mestizo, 29.16% as Indigenous, 9.80% as white, and 1.71% as belonging to another group.

Historians, academics and social activists have disputed the accuracy of the census when contrasted with the 1793 census, citing relatively low frequency of marriages between people of different continental ancestries in colonial and early independent Mexico. It is claimed that the mestizaje process sponsored by the state resulted in the numbers of the Mestizo Mexican group being inflated at the expense of the identity of other races. The 1921 census was the last time the Mexican Government conducted a comprehensive racial census.

Federative Units	Population categories (%)		
Federative Units	Mestizo	Amerindian	White
Aguascalientes	66.12%	16.70%	16.77%
Baja California (Distrito Norte)	72.50%	7.72%	0.35%
Baja California (Distrito Sur)	59.61%	6.06%	33.40%
Campeche	41.45%	43.41%	14.17%
Coahuila	77.88%	11.38%	10.13%
Colima	68.54%	26.00%	4.50%
Chiapas	36.27%	47.64%	11.82%
Chihuahua	50.09%	12.76%	36.33%
Durango	89.85%	9.99%	0.01%
Guanajuato	96.33%	2.96%	0.54%
Guerrero	54.05%	43.84%	2.07%
Hidalgo	51.47%	39.49%	8.83%
Jalisco	75.83%	16.76%	7.31%
Mexico City	54.78%	18.75%	22.79%
State of Mexico	47.71%	42.13%	10.02%
Michoacán	70.95%	21.04%	6.94%
Morelos	61.24%	34.93%	3.59%
Nayarit	73.45%	20.38%	5.83%
Nuevo León	75.47%	5.14%	19.23%
Oaxaca	28.15%	69.17%	1.43%
Puebla	39.34%	54.73%	5.66%
Querétaro	80.15%	19.40%	0.30%
Quintana Roo	42.35%	20.59%	15.16%
San Luis Potosí	61.88%	30.60%	5.41%
Sinaloa	98.30%	0.93%	0.19%
Sonora	41.04%	14.00%	42.54%
Tabasco	53.67%	18.50%	27.56%
Tamaulipas	69.77%	13.89%	13.62%
Tlaxcala	42.44%	54.70%	2.53%
Veracruz	50.09%	36.60%	10.28%
Yucatán	33.83%	43.31%	21.85%
Zacatecas	86.10%	8.54%	5.26%

==== Modern era ====
Racial groups in Mexico (2020 census)
1. Undeclared (78.5%)
2. Indigenous (19.4%)
3. Blacks (2.04%)

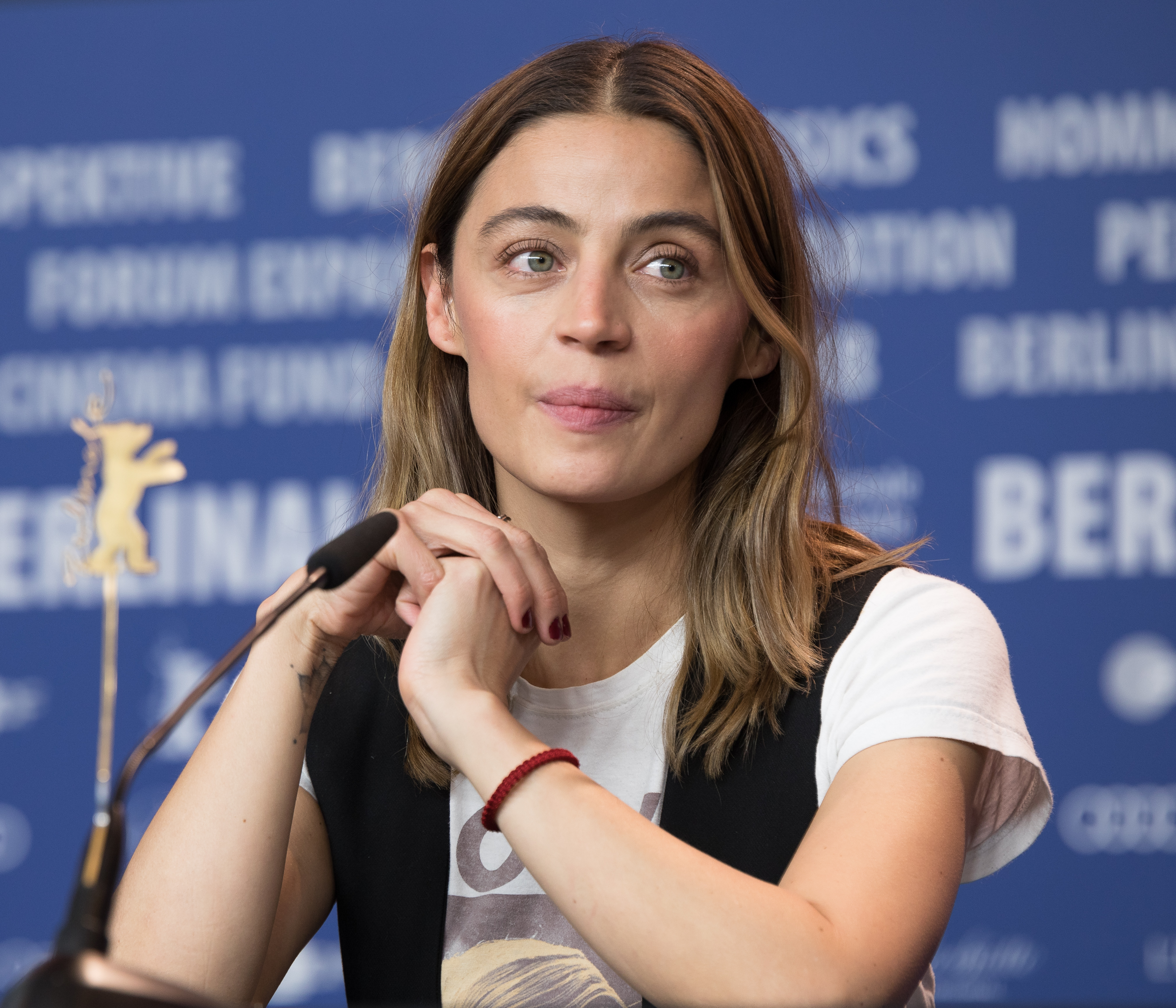
Ilse Salas has contributed significantly to representing contemporary Mexican society through films like "Las niñas bien" (The Good Girls) and Güeros.

Since the end of the Mexican Revolution, the official identity promoted by the government for non-indigenous Mexicans has been the Mestizo one, a mix of European and indigenous culture and heritage, established with the original intent of eliminating divisions and creating a unified identity that would allow Mexico to modernize and integrate with the international community. Even though nowadays the large majority of the country's population consider themselves Mexicans, differences on physical features and appearance continue playing an important role on everyday social interactions, taking this into account, on recent time Mexico's government has begun conducting ethnic investigations to quantify the different ethnic groups that inhabit the country with the aim of reducing social inequalities between them.

According to these recent investigations, 19.4% of Mexico's population self-identify as Indigenous and 2.04% self-identify as Afro-Mexican, there is no definitive census that quantifies White Mexicans, with estimates from the Mexican government and other contemporary sources reporting results that estimate them at about one-third of the country's population, This figure is based on phenotypical traits, rather than genetic ancestry or self-identified ancestry.

Generally speaking ethnic relations can be arranged on an axis between the two extremes of European and Amerindian cultural heritage, this is a remnant of the Spanish caste system which categorized individuals according to their perceived level of biological mixture between the two groups although in practice the classificatory system has become fluid, mixing socio-cultural traits with phenotypical traits allowing individuals to move between categories and define their ethnic and racial identities situationally, the presence of considerable portions of the population with African and Asian heritage makes the situation more complex.

Even though there is a large variation in phenotypes among Mexicans, European looks are strongly preferred in Mexican society, with lighter skin receiving more positive attention, as it is associated with higher social class, power, money, and modernity. In contrast, Indigenous ancestry is often associated with having an inferior social class, as well as lower levels of education. These distinctions are strongest in Mexico City, where the most powerful of the country's elite are located.

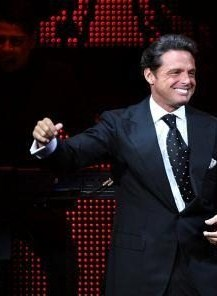
Luis Miguel, always referred to as The Sun of Mexico.

Despite Mexico's government not using racial terms related to European or white people officially for almost a century, resuming using such terms after 2010, the concepts of "white people" (known as güeros or blancos in Mexican Spanish) and of "being white" did not disappear and are still present in everyday Mexican culture: different idioms of race are used in Mexico's society that serve as mediating terms between racial groups. It is not strange to see street vendors calling a potential customer Güero or güerito, sometimes even when the person is not light-skinned. In this instance it is used to initiate a kind of familiarity, but in cases where social/racial tensions are relatively high, it can have the opposite effect. The lack of a clear dividing line between white and mixed race Mexicans means that the concept of race is fluid and subjective. Contemporary sociologists and historians agree that the concept of "race" has a psychological foundation rather than a biological one.

== Languages ==
Languages in Mexico, 2017:
1. Spanish (92.7%)
2. Spanish and indigenous languages (5.70%)
3. indigenous (0.80%)
4. unspecified (0.80%)

Spanish is the de facto official language in Mexico, spoken by 98.3% of the population in 2015. Mexican Spanish is spoken in a variety of dialects, accents and variations in different regions across Mexico. In 2020, indigenous languages were spoken by around 5% of Mexicans. In 2003, the General Law of Linguistic Rights of the Indigenous Peoples recognized 68 indigenous languages as "national languages", with the "same validity" in all territories and contexts where they are spoken.

The indigenous language with the greatest number of speakers is Nahuatl (1,586,884 speakers in 2010 or 1.5% of the nation's population), followed by Yucatec Maya (796,405 speakers in 2010 0.8%) spoken Yucatán Peninsula, Mixtecas languages (494,454), Tzeltal (474,298), Zapotecas languages (460,683), Tzotzil (429,168), Otomí (288,052), Totonaca (250,252) Mazateco (230,124), Chol (222,051) and 1,462,857 speakers of other languages. After half a century of rural-to-urban migration, in Mexico City and other major cities, large districts and sections use written and spoken Amerindian languages. In 2020, approximately 7,364,645 Mexicans (6.1% of the population) spoke an indigenous language.

During the first half of the 20th century the government promoted a policy of castellanización, promoting the use of Spanish to integrate indigenous peoples into Mexican society. Since the 1980s the government has sponsored bilingual and intercultural education in all indigenous communities. This policy has mainly been successful in large communities with a significant number of speakers. Some languages, with less than 1,000 speakers, are still facing extinction.

English is the second most spoken language in Mexico. It is used extensively at border areas, tourist centers and large metropolitan areas, a phenomenon arguably caused by the economic integration of North American under the North American Free Trade Agreement (NAFTA) and the immigration phenomenon and the return of workers and their families from the United States. In border cities, American TV and radio waves in English and Spanish are received as much as Spanish-speaking radio and TV stations from Mexico on the US side of the border, thus a bilingual cross-cultural exchange is at work. Among the languages brought to Mexico by immigrants are the Venetian of Chipilo, and Mennonite Low German spoken in Durango and Chihuahua.

== Mexican nationality and citizenship ==
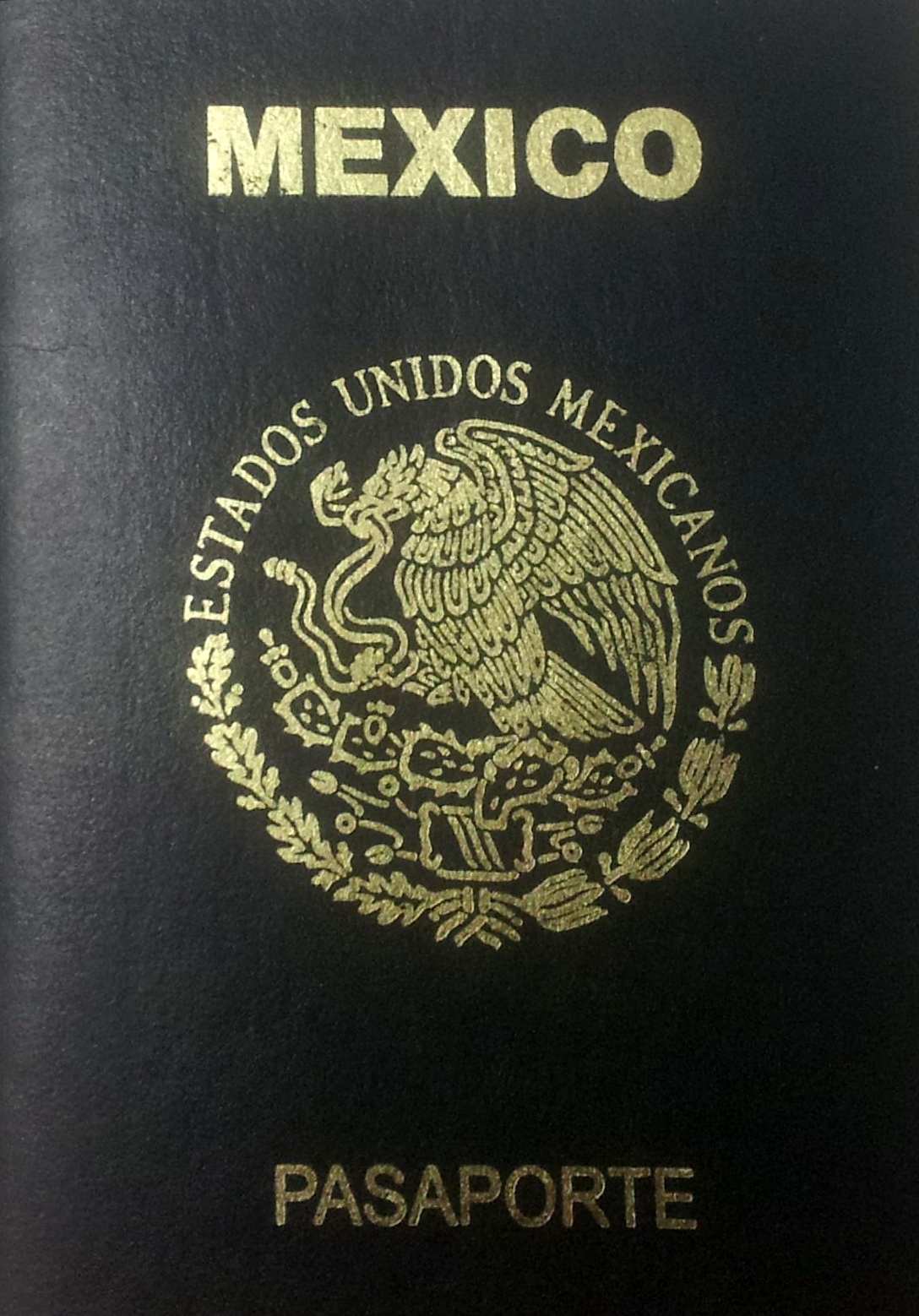
Mexican passport

The Constitution of Mexico grants Mexican nationality based on birth and naturalization. Mexican laws regarding nationality by birth are very open. Mexican nationality by birth is granted to:

- all those individuals born in Mexican territory,
- all those individuals born outside Mexico, whose father or mother is Mexican by birth,
- all those individuals born outside Mexico, whose father or mother is Mexican by naturalization,
- all those individuals born aboard Mexican aircraft or sea vessels, whether warships or commercial vessels.

Mexican nationality by naturalization is granted to:

- foreign citizens granted Mexican nationality by the Secretariat of Government (Ministry of the Interior);
- foreign citizens married to a Mexican national, whether by birth or naturalization.

== Religion ==
Religion in Mexico by percentage, 2017:
1. Catholic (82.7%)
2. Evangelical Churches (5.00%)
3. Pentecostal (1.60%)
4. Jehovah's Witnesses (1.40%)
5. other (1.90%)
6. none (4.70%)
7. unspecified (2.70%)

In 2020, the adult Mexican population was predominantly Catholic. In 2006, 46% attended church on a weekly basis. In 2007, about 7.6% of the population was classified as Protestant or Evangelical, 2.5% were classified as "Non-Evangelical Biblical" (a classification that groups Adventists, Mormons and Jehovah's Witnesses), 0.05% as practicing Jews, and 4.6% without a religion. The largest group of Protestants are Pentecostals and Charismatics, classified as Neo-Pentecostals.

In 2007, the states with the highest percentage of professing Catholics were central states, namely Guanajuato (96.4%), Aguascalientes (95.6%) and Jalisco (95.4%). Southeastern states had the lowest percentage of Catholics, namely Chiapas (63.8%), Tabasco (70.4%) and Campeche (71.3%). The percentage of professing Catholics has been on the decrease over the last four decades, from over 98% in 1950 to 78% in 2020.

The average annual growth of Catholic believers from 1990 to 2000 was 1.7%. For non-Catholics, the annual growth was 3.7%. Given that the average annual population increase over the same time period was 1.8%, the percentage of Catholics in relation to the total population continues to be in overall decline.

Since 1857 with the La Reforma laws, the Mexican Constitution drastically separates Church and State, unlike some other countries in Latin America or Ibero-America. The State does not support or provide any economic resource to the Church, as is the case in Spain and Argentina. The Church cannot participate in public education. No public school can be operated by a Catholic order, although they can participate in private education. The government nationalized all the Church's properties, some of which were given back in the 1990s. Priests lost the right to vote or to be voted for. In the 1990s, they regained the right to vote.

== See also ==
- List of municipalities in Mexico by population
- Metropolitan areas of Mexico
- List of Mexican states by population
- List of Mexican states by fertility rate
- Economy of Mexico
- Poverty in Mexico
- Romani Mexicans
