= Pachuca metropolitan area =

- Metropolitan Area
- Zona Metropolitana de Pachuca (Spanish)
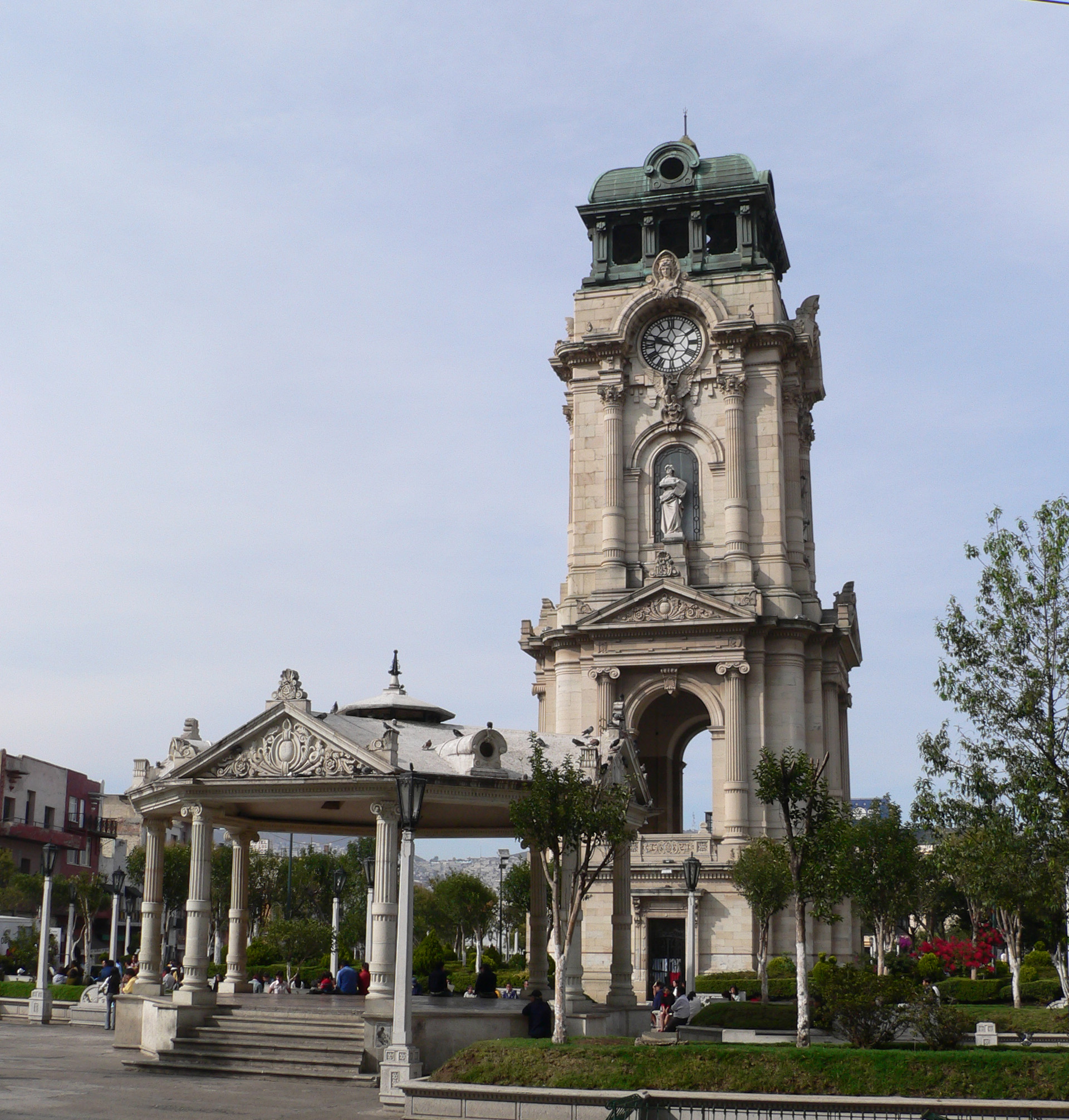
- Reloj Monumental de Pachuca
Interactive Map of Pachuca metropolitan area
City of Pachuca / Ciudad de Pachuca de Soto
Pachuca Metro Area / Zona Metropolitana
- Country: Mexico
- State: (Hidalgo (state)) Hidalgo

Population
  - Total: 665,929
- Time zone: UTC-6 (CST)

The Pachuca metropolitan area (Spanish: Zona metropolitana de Pachuca de Soto) is a metropolitan area located in the state of Hidalgo in Mexico. It consists of the municipalities of Pachuca, Mineral del Monte, Mineral de la Reforma, San Agustín Tlaxiaca, Epazoyucan, Zapotlán de Juárez and Zempoala.

The metropolitan area arose from the population growth that the city of Pachuca had in the years 2000-2010, due to the proximity of Mexico City, urban growth began to spread to other municipalities, occupying agricultural areas and ejidos, creating the metropolitan area.

21.6% of the population of the state of Hidalgo lives in this metropolitan area, and two out of every ten Hidalguenses live in this area. This metropolitan area, together with the metropolitan areas of Tulancingo and Tula, are part of the Mexico City megalopolis.

== Delimitation ==
The National Population Council (CONAPO), the National Institute of Statistics, Geography and Informatics (INEGI) and the Secretary of Social Development (SEDESOL) define a metropolitan area as the set of two or more municipalities where a city of 50,000 or more inhabitants, whose urban area, functions and activities exceed the limits of the municipality that originally contained it.

The central municipalities are Pachuca and Mineral de la Reforma, the outer municipality defined by functional integration is Mineral del Monte, and the outer municipalities defined based on urban policy are San Agustín Tlaxiaca, Epazoyucan, Zapotlán de Juárez and Zempoala. On occasions, due to their functional relationship, it has been incorporated into Mineral del Chico.

== Population ==
Municipality	Municipal seat	Population (2020)	Area in km^{2}	Inhabitants per km^{2}
Epazoyucan	Epazoyucan	16,285	142.3	114.4
Mineral del Monte	Mineral del Monte	14,324	53.4	268.1
Pachuca	Pachuca	314,331	154.0	2040.7
Mineral de la Reforma	Pachuquilla	202,749	112.5	1801.6
San Agustín Tlaxiaca	Tlaxiaca	38,891	297.4	130.8
Zapotlán de Juárez	Zapotlán	21,443	105.3	203.7
Zempoala	Zempoala	57,906	319.9	181.0
Total		665,929	1184.8	562.06
Source: INEGI.

== Infrastructure ==
The main cities are Pachuca and Mineral de la Reforma, since they concentrate approximately 80% of the population of this metropolitan area, maintaining a close physical conurbation. The Pachuca metropolitan area is of great population exchange between its municipalities, in which Pachuca is the driving force since 91.7% of its population works in the same municipality where they reside, for which reason only 8% travel to Mexico City and 0.3% to another municipality in the same area.

The water and sewerage service is administered and provided by the Intermunicipal Water and Sewerage Commission (CAASIM), and provides the service to the municipalities of Pachuca, Mineral de la Reforma, Zapotlán de Juárez, San Agustín Tlaxiaca, Zempoala, Singuilucan, Epazoyucan, Tlanalapa and Tepeapulco, and supplies block water to Tizayuca, Villa de Tezontepec, Tolcayuca, El Arenal and Mineral del Chico.

According to the results of the State Transport Institute, about 5,000 vehicles provide this service with 112 routes and 50 bases in the metropolitan area, however, only 56 routes and 90 routes serve Pachuca, 28 routes and 40 routes are inter-municipal and the rest are from other municipalities. On 16 August 2015, the Tuzobús, the trunk route (Centro-Téllez) and 19 feeder routes were inaugurated and put into operation. It is a rapid transit bus system for the metropolitan area serving mainly Pachuca and Mineral de la Reforma.

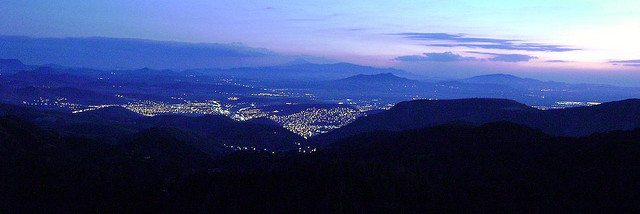
Night view of the Pachuca metropolitan area, from Las Ventanas in El Chico National Park.

== Metropolitan Commission of Pachuca ==
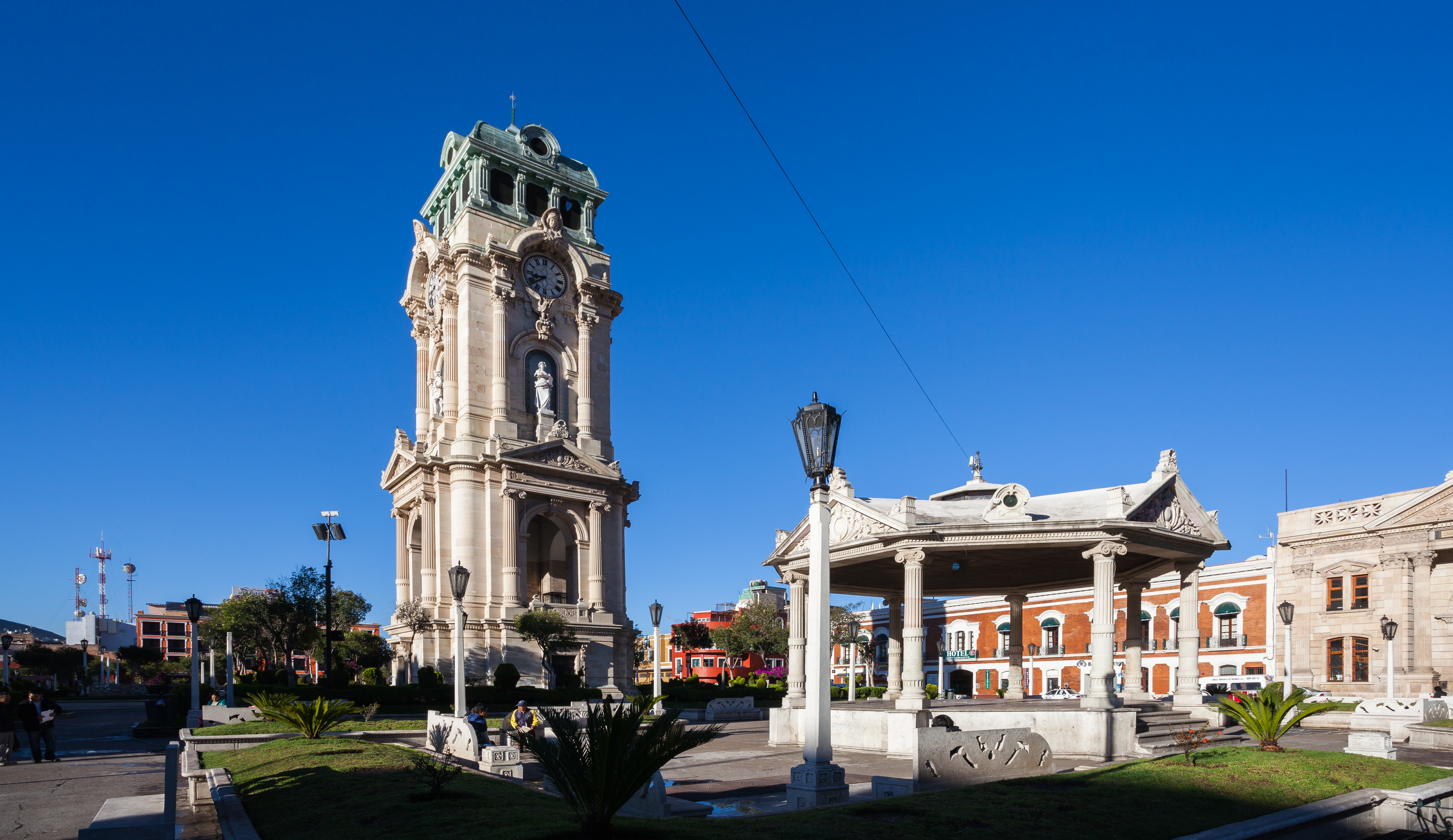
Monumental Clock of Pachuca in the Plaza Independencia right of the historic centre of Pachuca.

On 15 October 2009, the Metropolitan Commission of Pachuca was created, the commission was created in order to seek effective coordination mechanisms for adequate planning, regulation of physical growth, the provision of public services and care for the environment.

The municipalities that make it up are: seven from the metropolitan area (Pachuca de Soto, Zapotlán de Juárez, Zempoala, Epazoyucan, San Agustín Tlaxiaca, Mineral del Monte and Mineral de la Reforma) and four from the remaining municipalities (Tizayuca, Tolcayuca, Villa from Tezontepec and Mineral del Chico); these member municipalities meet most of the requirements established to be considered as part of the metropolitan area, even if the municipalities are not fully adjacent to the conurbation.

The municipality of Tizayuca is considered part of Greater Mexico City.

=== Planning ===
The consequences that the disproportionate metropolitan growth has had are caused by little planning, which has led to problems such as: insecurity, chaos in the police system, roads, water supply, territorial disputes between the different municipalities of the metropolitan area, and problems in paying the property tax.

The explosive growth of the population of Pachuca de Soto and its suburbs has caused border conflicts with the municipalities of Mineral de la Reforma, San Agustín Tlaxiaca, Zempoala and Zapotlán de Juárez. The commission was created in order to search for effective coordination mechanisms for adequate planning, regulation of physical growth, provision of public services and care for the environment. With this commission, the following is planned:

- The creation of a Metropolitan Road Regulation.
- The creation of a Metropolitan Canine Control Center in Mineral de la Reforma.
- Collection and application of funds for the construction and maintenance of common roads.
- Sanitation of the drinking water system.
- Delimitation of municipal limits to end dual property tax collections.
- Solution of public transport problems.
- Increased public safety.
- Communication channels
- Social development.

== See also ==
- Metropolitan Areas of Mexico
