= Metropolitan areas of Mexico =

A map showing the location of the metropolitan areas in Mexico in 2004.

Metropolitan areas of Mexico have been defined as the group of municipalities that heavily interact with each other, usually around a core city, in Mexico. The phenomenon of metropolization in Mexico is relatively recent, starting in the 1940s. Because of an accelerated level of urbanization in the country, the definition of a metropolitan area (in Mexican Spanish: zona metropolitana) is reviewed periodically by the Mexican population and census authorities.

== Identifying metropolitan areas in Mexico ==
One of the first studies on a methodology to define and quantify the metropolitan areas in Mexico was published by El Colegio de México in 1978. In Luis Unikel's book "Urban Development in Mexico: Diagnosis and Future Implications", a metropolitan area was designated as "the territorial area that includes the political and administrative units from a central city, and any contiguous, urban political and administrative units with a direct socioeconomic interrelation with the central city, and viceversa". 12 metropolitan areas were identified, containing 25.6 percent of the national population.

A 1993 study published by Mexico's National Institute of Public Administration (INAP), "Metropolitan and Regional Government and Management", defined a metropolitan area as "the physical or functional union of two or more municipalities that contain a central city and its contiguous locations, or a central city and surrounding locations under its socio-economic influence", and increased the number of metropolitan areas to 37.

In 2004, a joint effort between the National Population Council (CONAPO), INEGI and the Ministry of Social Development (SEDESOL) agreed to officially define metropolitan areas as any of the following:

- a group of two or more municipalities in which a city with a population of at least 50,000 is located in an urban area that extends over the limit of the municipality that originally contained the core city incorporating, physically or under its area of direct influence other adjacent predominantly urban municipalities, all of which either have a high degree of social and economic integration or are relevant for urban politics and administration
- a single municipality in which a city of a population of at least one thousand is located and fully contained (that is, it does not transcend the limits of a single municipality)
- a city with a population of at least 250,000 that forms a conurbation with other cities in the United States.

The number of metropolitan areas increased to 55 under these criteria.

CONAPO last reviewed the criteria in 2018, and from that date, a metropolitan area in Mexico is defined as:

- a set of two or more municipalities where a city with a population of at least 100,000 is located, and whose urban area, functions and activities exceed the limits of the municipality, incorporating within its area of direct influence the predominantly urban neighboring municipalities, maintaining a high degree of socioeconomic integration. Also included are those municipalities that, due to their particular characteristics, are relevant to urban planning and policy for each metropolitan area.
- municipalities with a city of more than 500,000 inhabitants.
- municipalities with a city of more than 200,000 inhabitants located in the northern and southern border areas and in the coastal zone.
- municipalities where state capitals are located, if they are not already included in a metropolitan area.

These new criteria also introduced two groups of municipalities within a metropolitan area: core, the location of the core city or cities in the area; and peripheral, surrounding, urban areas with high degree of integration with the core.

As per this last definition, there are currently 74 metropolitan areas in Mexico. 75.1 million people, 62.8 percent of the country population, live within a metropolitan area.

== Metropolitan areas beyond municipal borders ==
Map of Greater Mexico City, the largest metropolitan area in the country

Northern states are generally divided into a small number of large municipalities, whereas central and southern states are divided into a large number of smaller municipalities. As such, metropolitan areas in the north of the country cover fewer municipalities than those in the central and southern parts.

A few metropolitan areas extend beyond the limits of one state, like Greater Mexico City (Mexico City, Mexico and Hidalgo), La Laguna (Coahuila and Durango), and Tampico (Tamaulipas and Veracruz).

== Financial situation of metropolitan areas in Mexico ==
Determining the public finance of metropolitan areas in Mexico has been challenging. Metropolitan areas in Mexico are complex in terms of population and industry. The Federal government of Mexico is transferring money to Municipalities of Mexico, but metropolitan areas in Mexico are increasingly plagued by a weakening fiscal capacity and rising local debt. The political factors that undermine a local tax reform in the metropolitan areas of Mexico are not well documented.

== List of metropolitan areas in Mexico by population ==
Official name of each metropolitan area, area in square kilometers and number of municipalities from CONAPO.

Population in 2020 from the 2020 Census, population in 2010 from the 2010 Census.

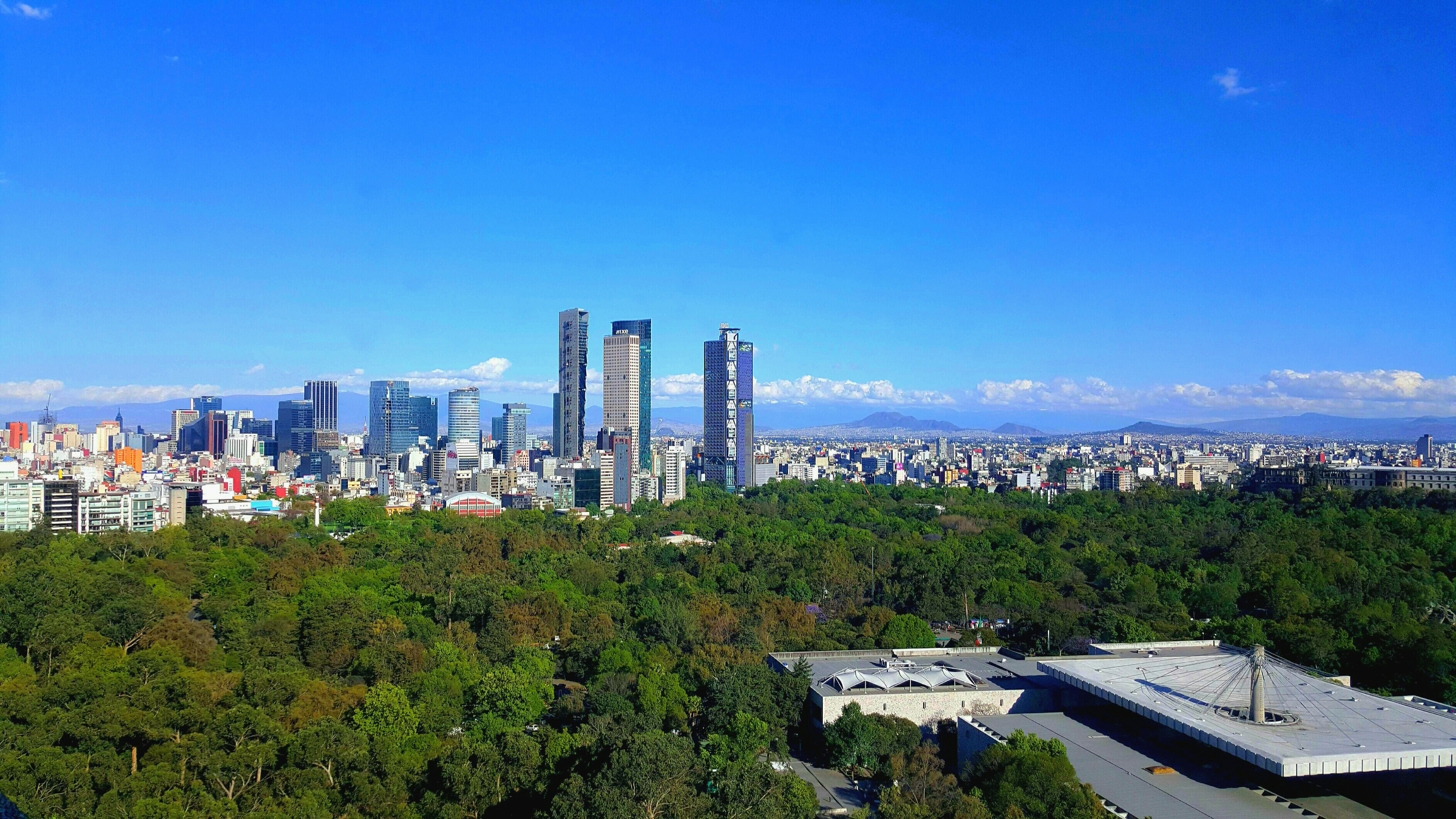
1 – Valley of Mexico / Mexico City

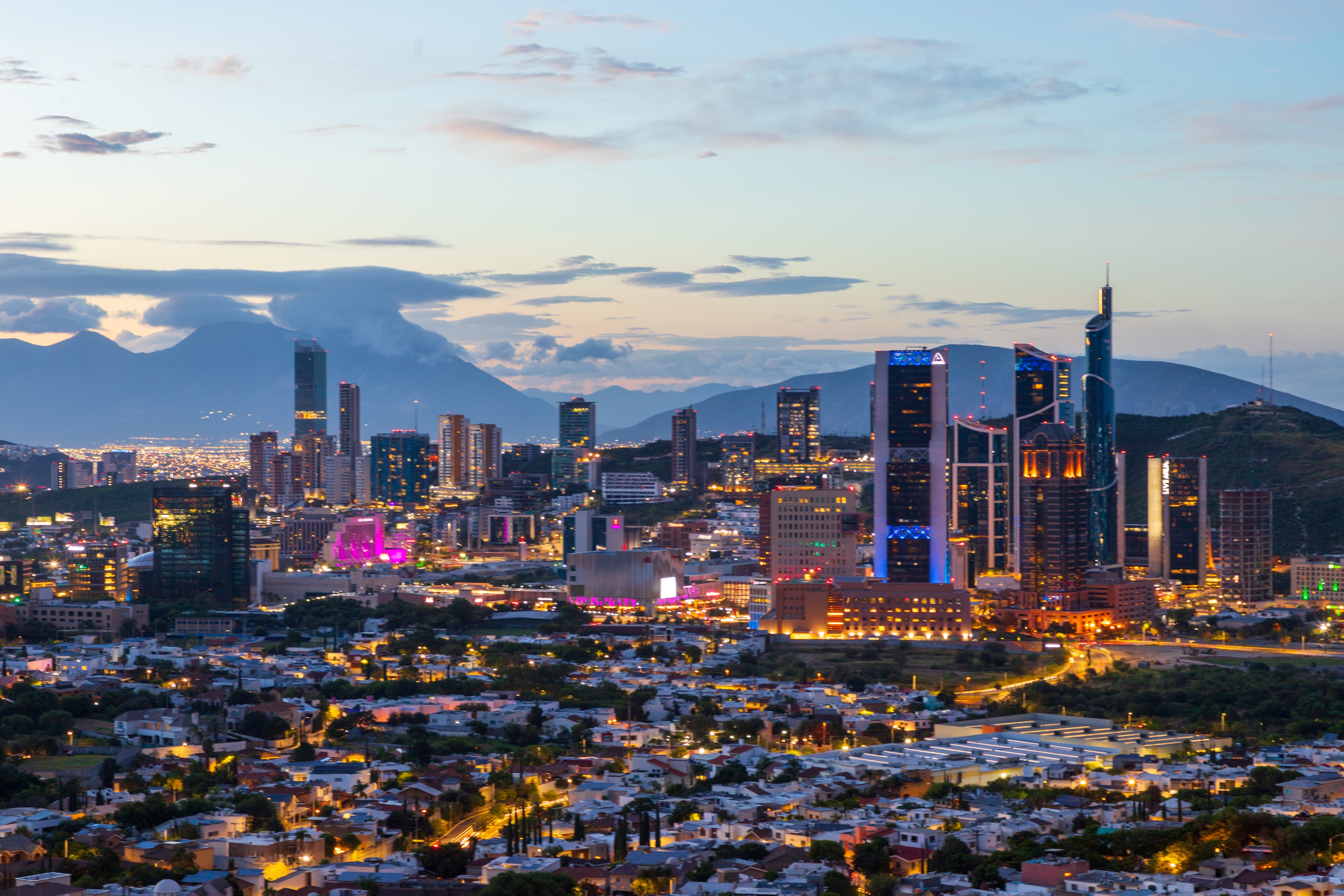
2 – Monterrey, Nuevo León.

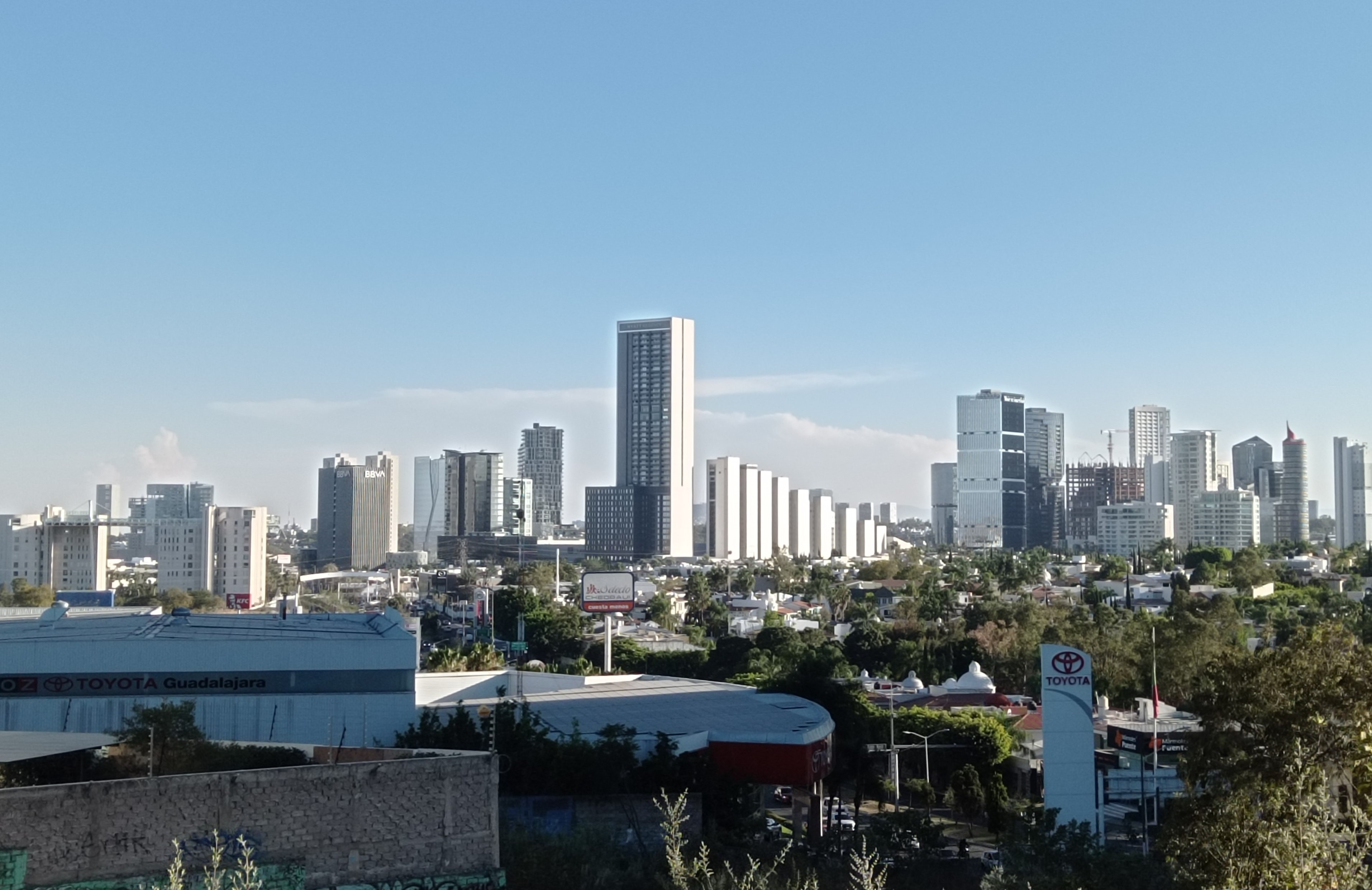
3 – Guadalajara, Jalisco.

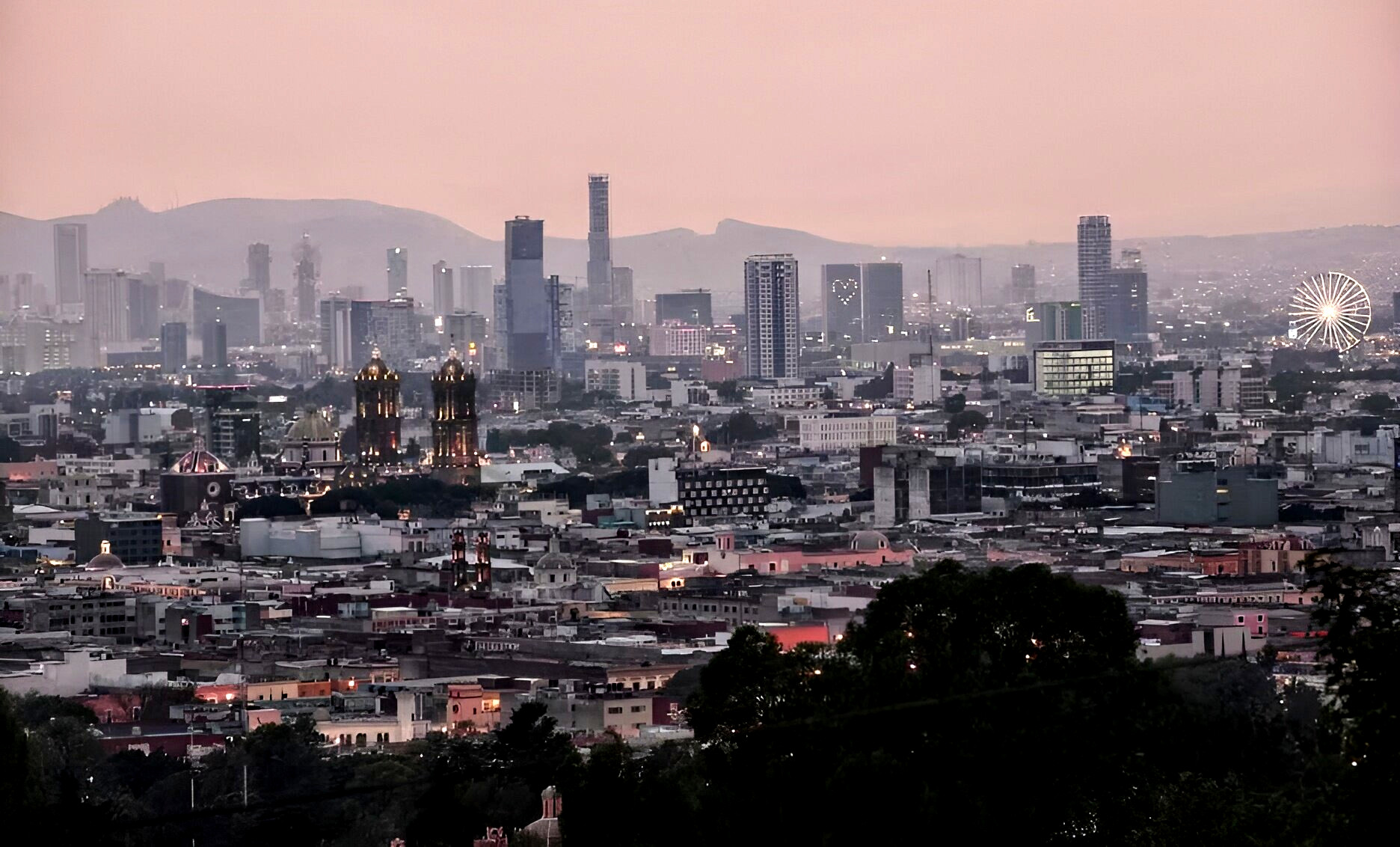
4 – Puebla, Puebla.

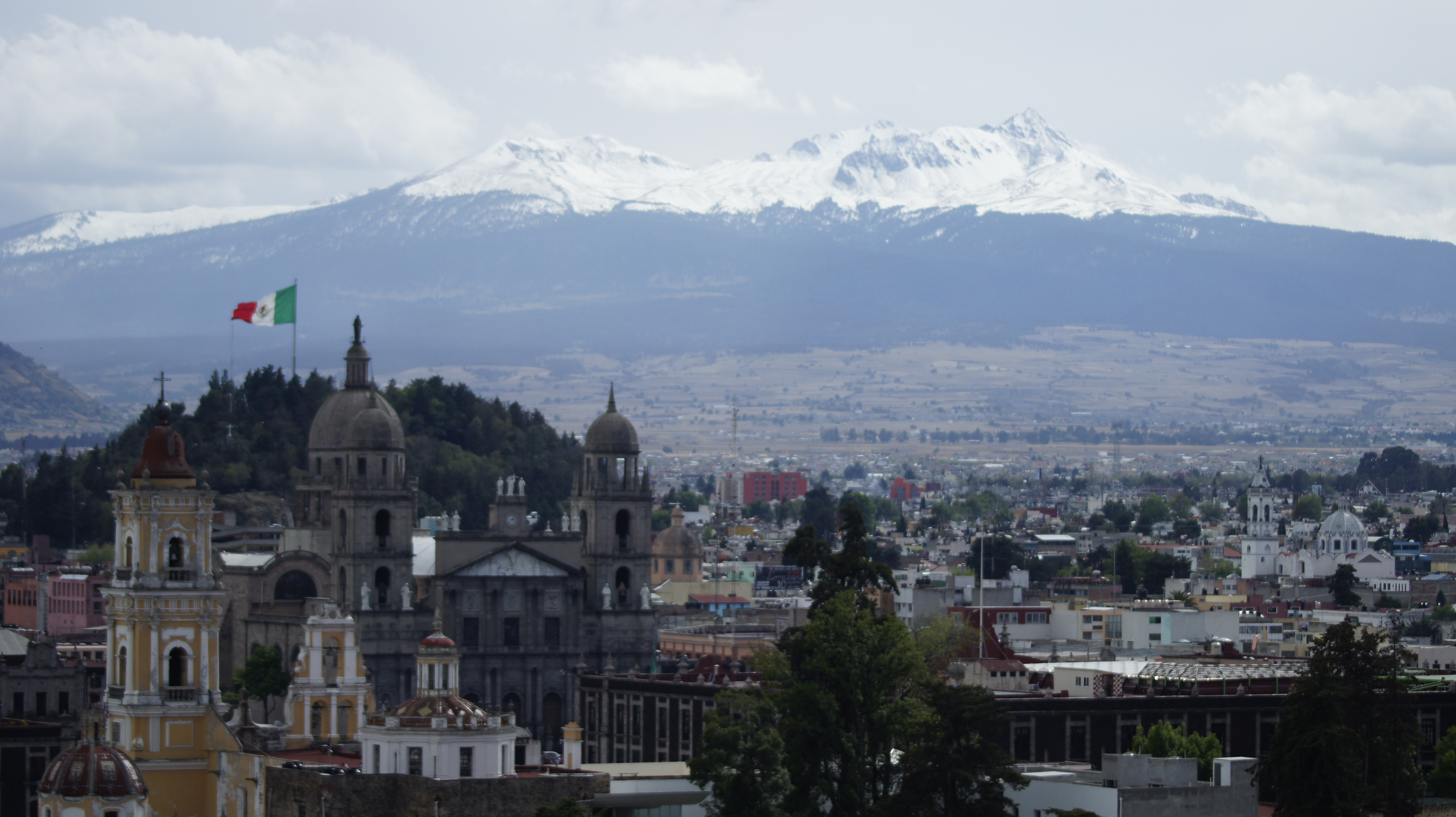
5 – Toluca, State of Mexico.

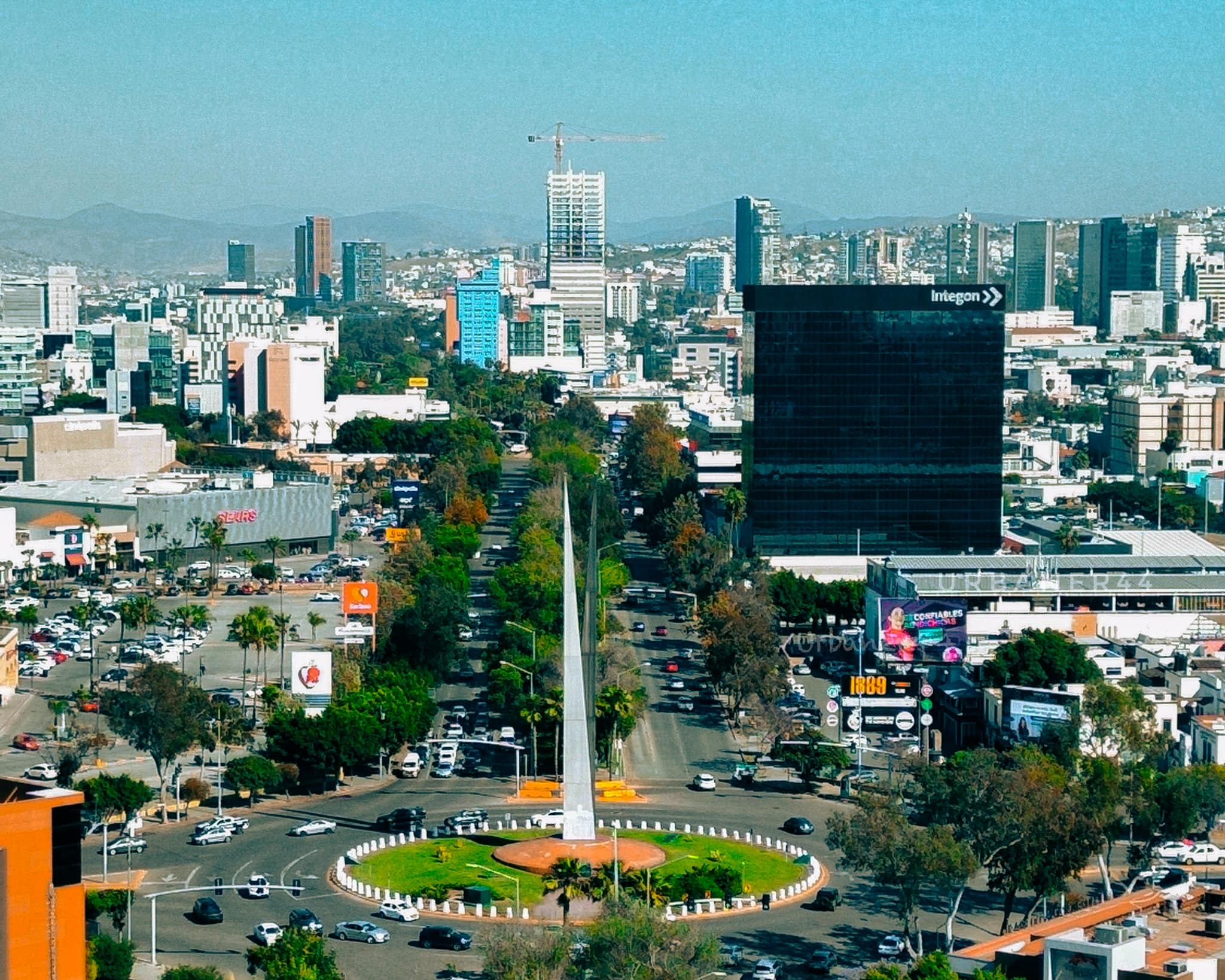
6 – Tijuana, Baja California.

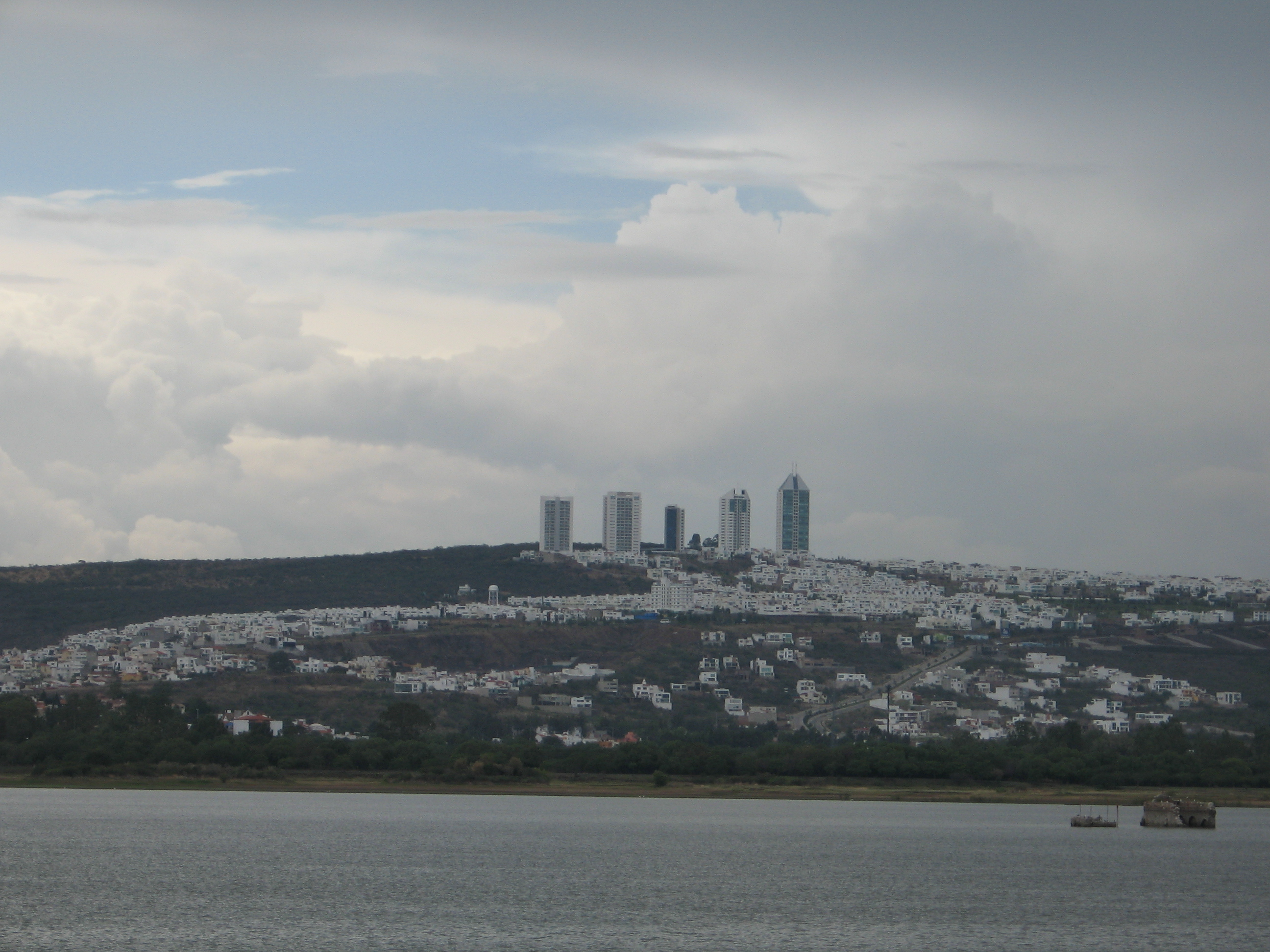
7 – León, Guanajuato.

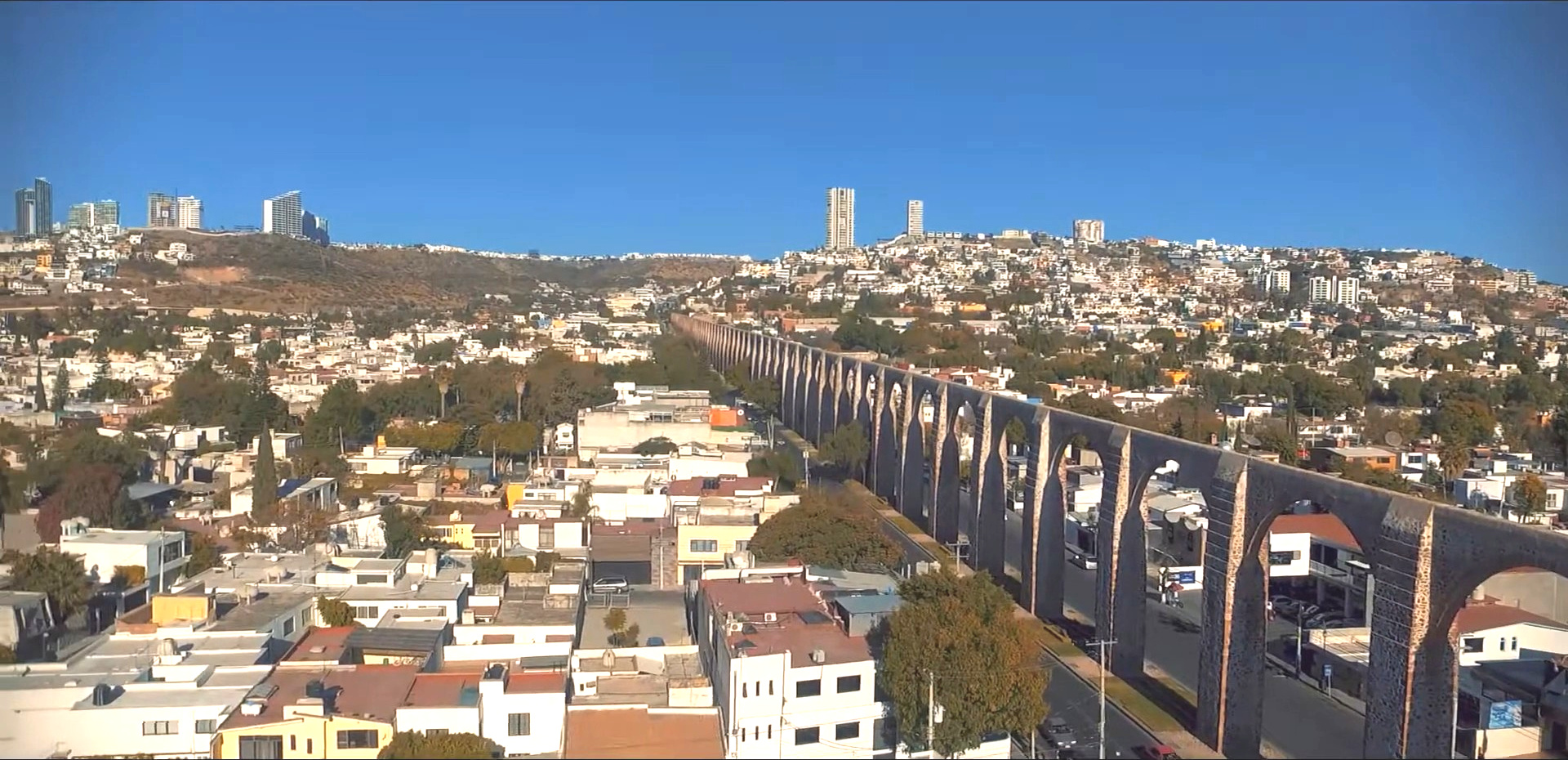
8 – Querétaro, Querétaro.

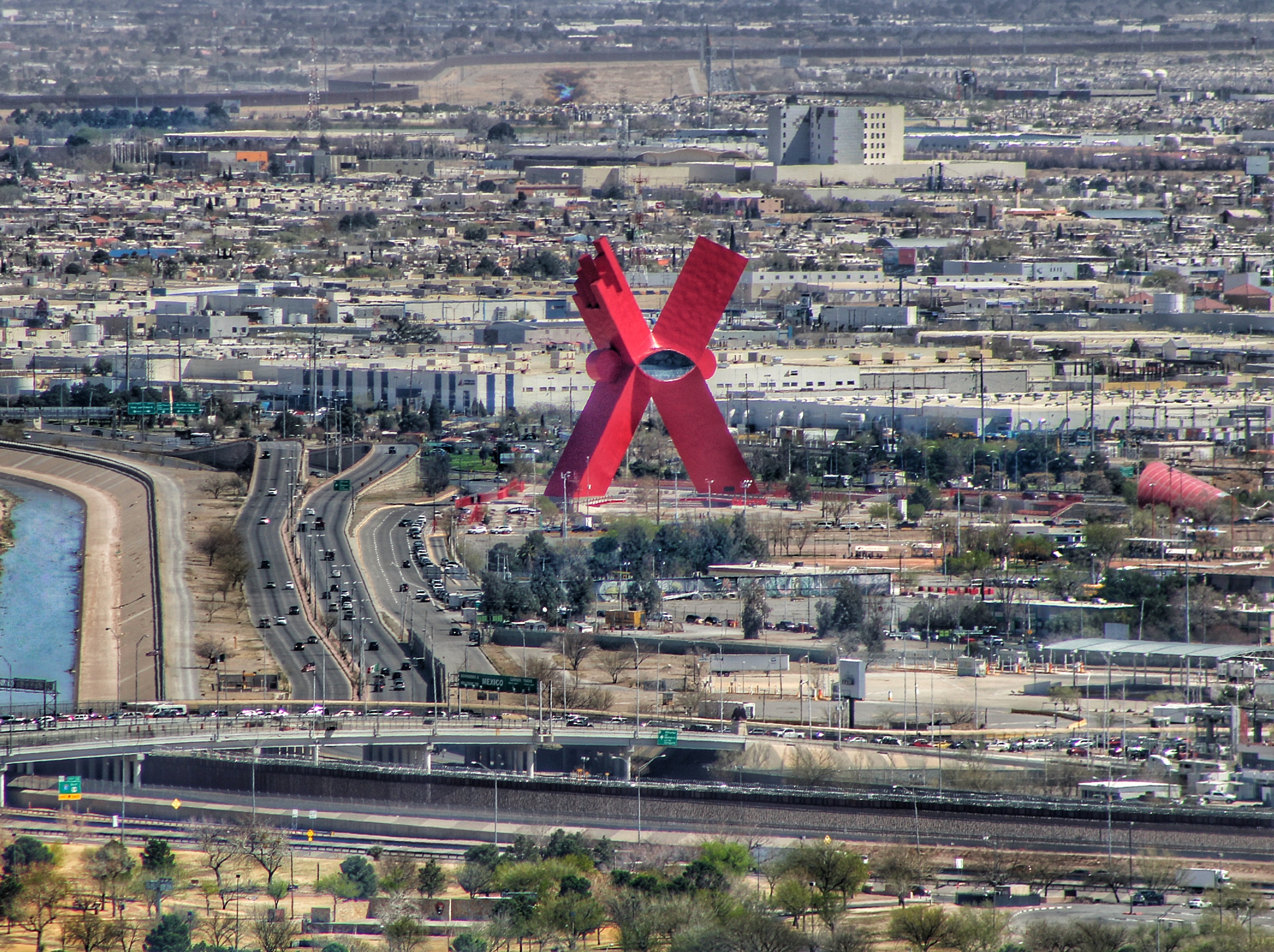
9 – Ciudad Juárez, Chihuahua.

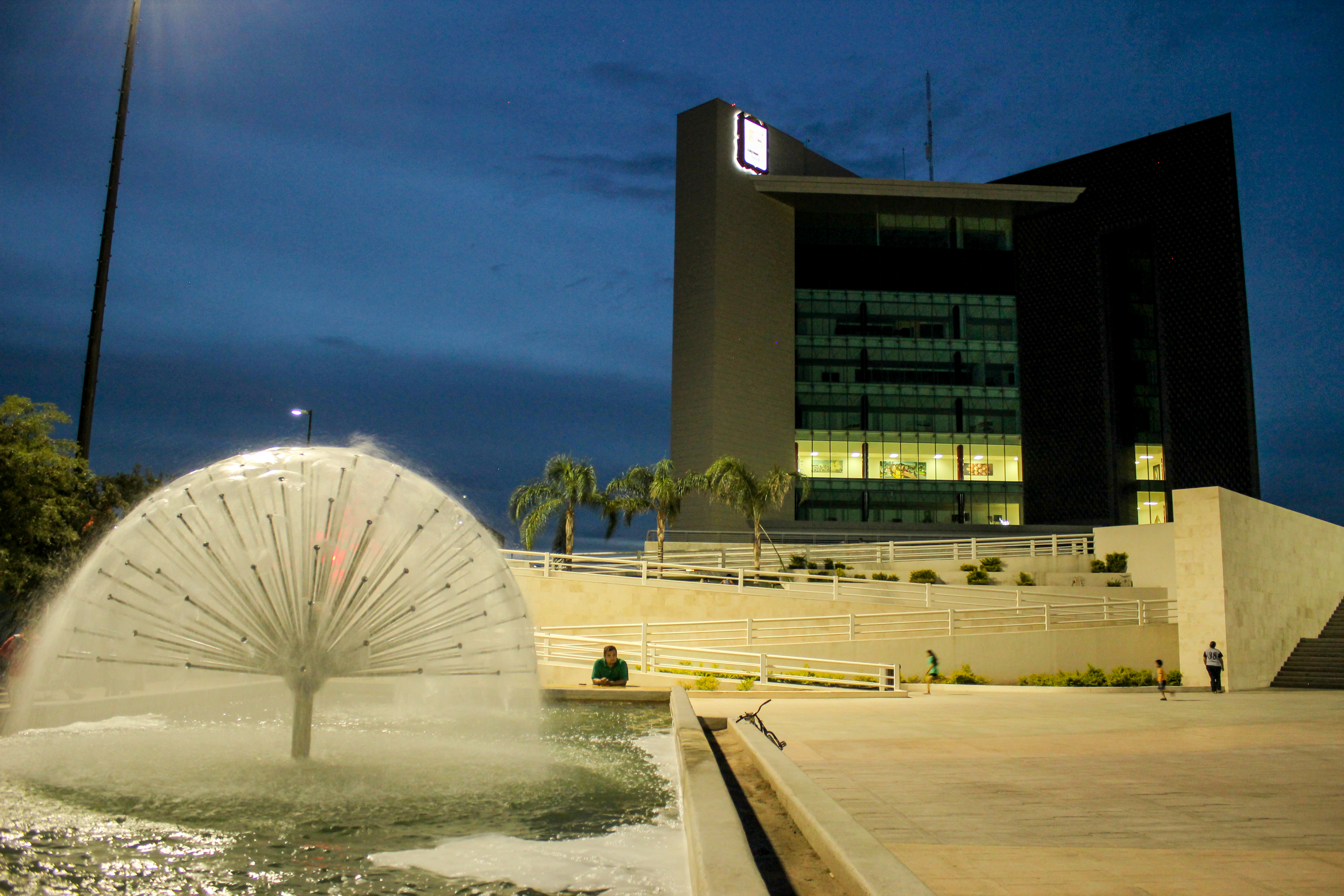
10 – La Laguna, Coahuila and Durango.

Rank	Metropolitan area	State(s)	Main cities	Municip.	Area (km^{2})	2020 Census	2010 Census	Change
1	Greater Mexico City	Mexico City, Mexico, Hidalgo	Mexico City, Ecatepec, Nezahualcóyotl	76	7,866.1	21,804,515	20,116,842	+8.39%
2	Monterrey	Nuevo León	Monterrey, Guadalupe, Apodaca	18	7,657.5	5,341,171	4,226,031	+26.39%
3	Guadalajara	Jalisco	Guadalajara, Zapopan, Tlaquepaque	10	3,560.6	5,286,642	4,521,755	+16.92%
4	Puebla-Tlaxcala	Puebla, Tlaxcala	Puebla, Cholula, Tlaxcalancingo	39	2,392.4	3,199,530	2,728,790	+17.25%
5	Toluca	Mexico	Toluca, Metepec, Zinacantepec	16	2,410.5	2,353,924	2,014,091	+16.87%
6	Tijuana	Baja California	Tijuana, Tecate, Playas de Rosarito	3	4,422.7	2,157,853	1,751,430	+23.21%
7	León	Guanajuato	León, Silao	2	1,760.1	1,924,771	1,609,504	+19.59%
8	Querétaro	Querétaro, Guanajuato	Querétaro, El Pueblito, Apaseo el Alto	5	2,427.3	1,594,212	1,161,458	+37.26%
9	Juárez	Chihuahua	Ciudad Juárez	1	3,547.5	1,512,450	1,332,131	+13.54%
10	La Laguna	Coahuila, Durango	Torreón, Gómez Palacio, Lerdo	5	7,889.0	1,434,283	1,271,493	+12.80%
11	Mérida	Yucatán	Mérida, Kanasín	11	3,044.2	1,316,088	1,053,519	+24.92%
12	San Luis Potosí	San Luis Potosí	San Luis Potosí, Soledad	3	2,401.9	1,271,366	1,040,822	+22.15%
13	Aguascalientes	Aguascalientes	Aguascalientes, Jesús María	3	1,822.3	1,225,432	932,369	+31.43%
14	Mexicali	Baja California	Mexicali	1	15,654.0	1,049,792	936,826	+12.06%
15	Saltillo	Coahuila	Saltillo, Ramos Arizpe	3	14,009.3	1,031,779	823,128	+25.35%
16	Cuernavaca	Morelos	Cuernavaca, Jiutepec, Temixco	8	1,189.9	1,028,589	924,964	+11.20%
17	Culiacán	Sinaloa	Culiacán	1	6,305.0	1,003,530	858,638	+16.87%
18	Morelia	Michoacán	Morelia	3	1,771.2	988,704	829,625	+19.17%
19	Chihuahua	Chihuahua	Chihuahua	3	18,093.7	988,065	852,533	+15.90%
20	Veracruz	Veracruz	Veracruz, Boca del Río	6	1,888.8	939,046	811,671	+15.69%
21	Hermosillo	Sonora	Hermosillo	1	16,955.2	936,263	784,342	+19.37%
22	Cancún	Quintana Roo	Cancún	2	3,053.6	934,189	677,379	+37.91%
23	Tampico	Tamaulipas, Veracruz	Tampico, Ciudad Madero, Miramar	5	5,281.7	927,379	859,419	+7.91%
24	Acapulco	Guerrero	Acapulco	2	3,538.5	852,622	863,431	−1.25%
25	Tuxtla Gutiérrez	Chiapas	Tuxtla Gutiérrez, Chiapa de Corzo	5	2,160.9	848,274	738,261	+14.90%
26	Reynosa	Tamaulipas	Reynosa, Río Bravo	2	4,730.6	837,251	727,150	+15.14%
27	Villahermosa	Tabasco	Villahermosa	2	2,253.1	833,907	755,425	+10.39%
28	Xalapa	Veracruz	Xalapa, Coatepec	8	1,090.0	778,139	711,369	+9.39%
29	Celaya	Guanajuato	Celaya, Cortázar, Comonfort	4	1,505.4	767,104	690,442	+11.10%
30	Oaxaca	Oaxaca	Oaxaca, Xoxocotlán	24	634.0	713,925	619,367	+15.27%
31	Durango	Durango	Durango	1	9,285.4	688,697	582,267	+18.28%
32	Pachuca	Hidalgo	Pachuca	7	1,184.8	665,929	512,196	+30.01%
33	Tlaxcala–Apizaco	Tlaxcala	Apizaco, Chiautempan, Tlaxcala	19	708.1	570,308	499,567	+14.16%
34	Matamoros	Tamaulipas	Matamoros	1	4,633.2	541,979	489,193	+10.79%
35	Poza Rica	Veracruz	Poza Rica, Coatzintla, Papantla	5	2,789.0	521,530	513,518	+1.56%
36	Mazatlán	Sinaloa	Mazatlán	1	2,532.6	501,441	438,434	+14.37%
37	Tepic	Nayarit	Tepic, Xalisco	2	2,139.0	491,153	429,351	+14.39%
38	Cuautla	Morelos	Cuautla, Yautepec	6	979.6	483,455	434,147	+11.36%
39	Puerto Vallarta	Jalisco, Nayarit	Puerto Vallarta, Valle de Banderas	2	1,452.2	479,471	379,886	+26.21%
40	Orizaba	Veracruz	Orizaba, Río Blanco	13	641.8	465,175	427,406	+8.84%
41	Ensenada‡	Baja California	Ensenada	1	19,346.0	443,807	466,814	−4.93%
42	Nuevo Laredo	Tamaulipas	Nuevo Laredo	1	1,224.0	425,058	384,033	+10.68%
43	Zacatecas–Guadalupe	Zacatecas	Zacatecas, Guadalupe	5	1,820.2	405,285	335,947	+20.64%
44	Colima–Villa de Álvarez	Colima	Colima, Villa de Álvarez	5	2,287.6	380,575	334,240	+13.86%
45	Monclova–Frontera	Coahuila	Monclova, Frontera	4	11,495.1	374,247	339,462	+10.25%
46	Minatitlán	Veracruz	Minatitlán	6	2,930.3	359,228	356,137	+0.87%
47	Tehuacán	Puebla	Tehuacán	2	647.0	357,621	296,899	+20.45%
48	Coatzacoalcos	Veracruz	Coatzacoalcos	3	496.0	355,738	347,257	+2.44%
49	Tapachula	Chiapas	Tapachula	1	980.1	353,706	320,451	+10.38%
50	Ciudad Victoria	Tamaulipas	Ciudad Victoria	1	1,463.6	349,688	321,953	+8.61%
51	Chilpancingo	Guerrero	Chilpancingo	2	3,249.9	336,480	287,875	+16.88%
52	Córdoba	Veracruz	Córdoba, Fortín de las Flores	4	460.4	335,950	316,032	+6.30%
53	Campeche	Campeche	Campeche	1	3,244.0	294,077	259,005	+13.54%
54	La Paz	Baja California Sur	La Paz	1	15,838.0	292,241	251,871	+16.03%
55	Zamora	Michoacán	Zamora, Jacona	2	453.7	273,641	250,113	+9.41%
56	Tulancingo	Hidalgo	Tulancingo, Cuautepec	3	673.1	268,351	239,579	+12.01%
57	Nogales	Sonora	Nogales	1	1,756.6	264,782	220,292	+20.20%
58	La Piedad–Pénjamo	Guanajuato, Michoacán	La Piedad, Pénjamo	2	1,845.8	261,450	249,512	+4.78%
59	Tula	Hidalgo	Tula	5	1,845.8	256,795	205,812	+24.77%
60	Chetumal‡‡	Quintana Roo	Chetumal	1	9,958.2	233,648	244,553	−4.46%
61	San Francisco del Rincón	Guanajuato	San Francisco del Rincón, Purísima	2	716.1	214,713	182,365	+17.74%
62	Piedras Negras	Coahuila	Piedras Negras	2	1,382.4	209,456	180,734	+15.89%
63	Guaymas	Sonora	Guaymas, Empalme	2	8,544.0	208,294	203,430	+2.39%
64	Delicias	Chihuahua	Ciudad Delicias	2	962.3	195,359	181,768	+7.48%
65	Guanajuato	Guanajuato	Guanajuato	1	1,014.1	194,500	171,706	+13.28%
66	Ocotlán	Jalisco	Ocotlán	3	1,240.3	184,603	164,256	+12.39%
67	Tianguistenco	Mexico	Santiago Tianguistenco	6	304.0	183,281	157,944	+16.04%
68	Tehuantepec	Oaxaca	Salina Cruz, Tehuantepec	5	1,712.1	179,870	182,870	−1.64%
69	Rioverde	San Luis Potosí	Rioverde, Ciudad Fernández	2	3,582.4	146,049	135,452	+7.82%
70	Tecomán	Colima	Tecomán, Armería	2	1,347.7	143,931	141,421	+1.77%
71	Teziutlán	Puebla	Teziutlán, Chignautla	2	240.9	138,806	122,500	+13.31%
72	Hidalgo del Parral	Chihuahua	Hidalgo del Parral, San Francisco del Oro	2	2,403.5	121,666	111,814	+8.81%
73	Acayucan	Veracruz	Acayucan, Oluta	3	830.0	114,416	112,996	+1.26%
74	Moroleón–Uriangato	Guanajuato	Moroleón, Uriangato	2	276.1	108,755	108,669	+0.08%

A new municipality, Bacalar, was created out of Othon P. Blanco's territory in February 2011.

Another new municipality, San Quintín, was created out of Ensenada's territory in February 2020.

== Transnational conurbations ==
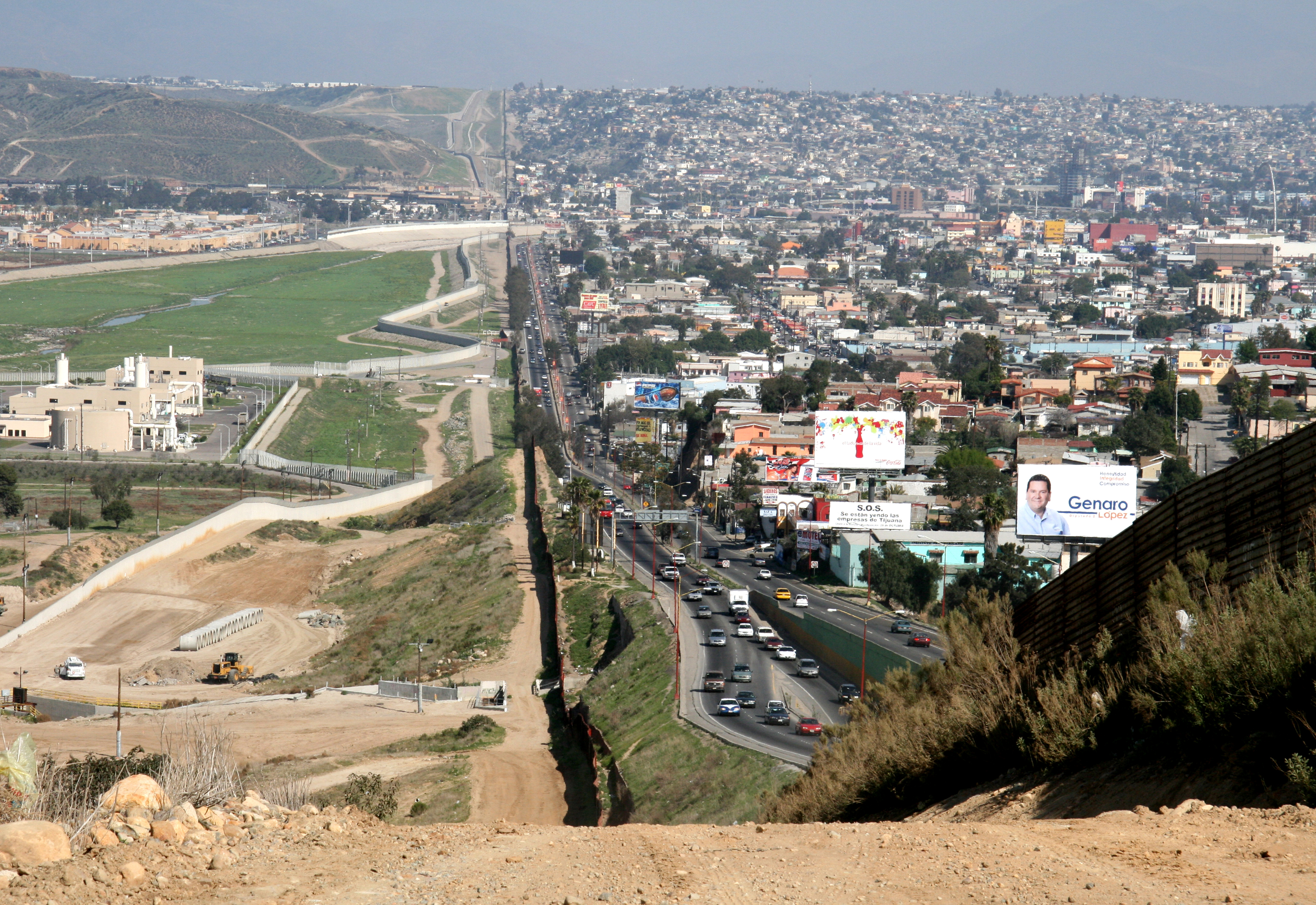
The Mexico–U.S. border separates densely populated Tijuana, Mexico (right), from San Diego, United States (left).

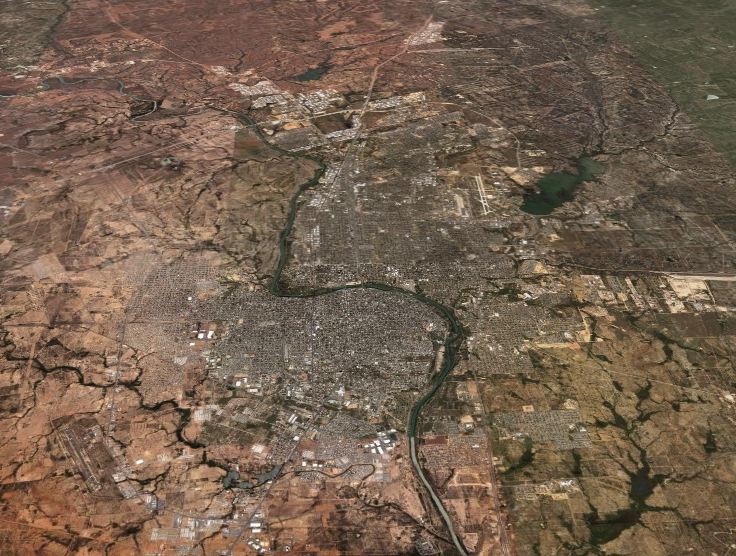
A 3D rendered image of the Nuevo Laredo – Laredo Metropolitan Area, a binational urban agglomeration divided by the Rio Grande.

The United States shares a 2,000 mi (3,000 km) border with Mexico. It is the most frequently crossed international border in the world, with about 250 million legal crossings every year.

The distribution of the population in Mexico, especially, in urban areas, has been changed significantly by the economic interaction between settlements in its north and the United States. The increasing population concentration in the north of Mexico is strongly associated with the development of the maquila industries there and the eventual economic effects of North American Free Trade Agreement (NAFTA).

Metropolitan areas at the border with the United States form transnational conurbations with deep economic and demographic interaction. For example, the San Diego – Tijuana metropolitan area consists of San Diego County in the US and the municipalities of Tijuana, Playas de Rosarito, and Tecate in Mexico. The total population of the region has been estimated to be just over 5 million in 2009, making it by far the largest binational metropolitan area shared between the US and Mexico. The National Population Council (CONAPO) recognizes the existence of such metropolitan areas and defines them as the municipalities with a city of at least 200,000 inhabitants and sharing processes of conurbation with cities of the US:

Rank	Metropolitan area	Mexican state	American state	Population
1	Tijuana–San Diego	Baja California	California	5,009,170
2	El Paso–Juarez	Chihuahua	Texas	2,345,182
3	Reynosa–McAllen	Tamaulipas	Texas	1,500,000
4	Matamoros–Brownsville	Tamaulipas	Texas	1,136,995
5	Mexicali–Calexico	Baja California	California	956,223
6	Nuevo Laredo–Laredo	Tamaulipas	Texas	747,494
7	Nogales–Nogales	Sonora	Arizona	234,809 (Note: Sum of legal residents of Nogales, Sonora (213,976) and Nogales, Arizona (20,833).)
8	Piedras Negras–Eagle Pass	Coahuila	Texas	230,205 (Note: Sum of legal residents of Eagle Pass Metropolitan Area's population (48,401) and Piedras Negras, Coahuila (154,360).)
9	San Luis Río Colorado–San Luis	Sonora	Arizona	188,152 (Note: Sum of legal residents of San Luis Río Colorado, Sonora (164,342) and San Luis, Arizona (23,810).)
10	Ciudad Acuña–Del Río	Coahuila	Texas	183,750 (Note: Sum of legal residents of Ciudad Acuña, Coahuila (135,605) and Del Rio, Texas (46,682).)

== Mexico City megalopolis ==
Mexico City megalopolis location

A megalopolis is defined as a long chain of continuous metropolitan areas or territories that are relatively integrated amongst each other, a clear example being the Northeast Megalopolis in the United States. In 1996, the Programa General de Desarollo Urbano del Distrito Federal first proposed this concept to refer to the Mexico City megalopolis, or "megalopolis of central Mexico", which was later expanded by PROAIRE, a metropolitan commission on the environment.

Known in the Spanish language as the corona regional del centro de México (regional ring), the megalopolis of Central Mexico was defined as the consolidation of the metropolitan areas of the Valley of Mexico, Puebla, Cuernavaca, Toluca, Pachuca, Tlaxcala, Tulancingo, Tula, Cuautla and Tianguistenco.

The Mexico City megalopolis spreads over 19,500 square kilometres (7,500 sq miles) and consists of 185 subdivisions in 6 federative entities. Furthermore, the Mexico City megalopolis spreads over 169 municipalities, of which 81 are in the State of Mexico. A further 39 are in Tlaxcala, 19 are in Puebla, 16 are in Hidalgo, 14 are in Morelos, and last but not least 16 boroughs of Mexico City.

== See also ==
- Demographics of Mexico
- List of cities in Mexico
- List of most populous cities in Mexico by decade
- List of municipalities in Mexico by population
- List of metropolitan areas by population
- List of metropolitan areas in the Americas by population
