= Mexico City megalopolis =

Megalopolis containing Greater Mexico City

Megalopolis of Central Mexico Corona regional del centro de México
- Megalopolis
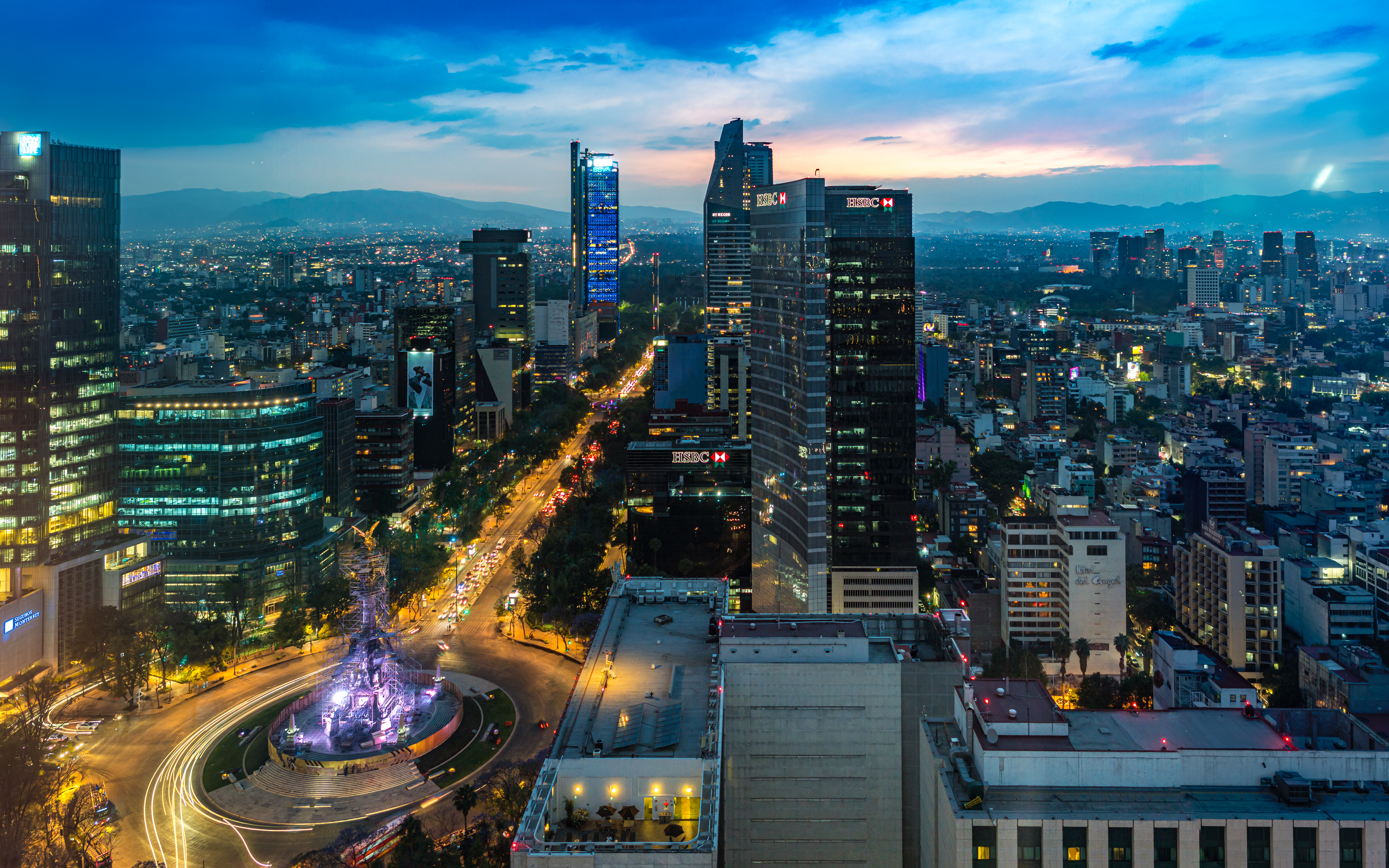
- Skyline of Mexico City
Interactive Map of Mexico City Megalopolis
Ciudad de México (16 Boroughs / Alcaldías)
Zona Metropolitana de México
Zona Metropolitana de Puebla–Tlaxcala
Zona Metropolitana de Toluca
Zona Metropolitana de Tianguistenco
Zona Metropolitana de Cuautla
Zona Metropolitana de Cuernavaca
Zona Metropolitana de Tlaxcala–Apizaco
Zona Metropolitana de Pachuca
Zona Metropolitana de Tula
Zona Metropolitana de Tulacingo
- Country: Mexico
- State: (Mexico City) Ciudad de México (State of Mexico) México (Hidalgo (state)) Hidalgo; Morelos; Puebla; Tlaxcala
- Largest city: Mexico City

Area
  - Metro: 19,554 km^{2} (7,550 sq mi)

Population
  - Metro: 32,408,889
  - Metro density: 1,657.4/km^{2} (4,292.7/sq mi)

GDP (Nominal, 2024)
  - Metro: MXN 10.35 trillion (US$510.75 billion)
- Time zone: UTC–06:00 (Zona Centro)

The Mexico City megalopolis, also known as the Megalopolis of Central Mexico (Spanish: Corona regional del centro de México), is a megalopolis containing Greater Mexico City and surrounding metropolitan areas.

In 1996, the Programa General de Desarollo Urbano del Distrito Federal first proposed the concept of a "Megalopolis of Central Mexico", which was later expanded by PROAIRE, a metropolitan commission on the environment.

The Megalopolis of Central Mexico (pre-2019 definition) includes 10 metropolitan areas of Mexico, as defined by the National Population Council (CONAPO): Valley of Mexico, Puebla, Toluca, Queretaro, Cuernavaca, Pachuca, Tlaxcala–Apizaco, Cuautla, Tulancingo, Tula and Tianguistenco. Some of these areas form complex subregional rings themselves (i.e. Puebla forming a regional ring with Atlixco, San Martín Texmelucan, Tlaxcala and Apizaco).

The megalopolis (pre-2019 definition) spreads over 19,500 square kilometres (7,500 sq mi), and consists of 185 subdivisions in 6 federative entities: 169 municipalities, 81 in the State of Mexico, 39 in Tlaxcala, 19 in Puebla, 16 in Hidalgo, and 14 in Morelos; plus the 16 boroughs of Mexico City. Its population as of 2020 is 30.8 million people, about 25% of the country's total.

Since 2019 the megalopolis (as defined by the Environmental Commission for the Megalopolis, CAMe) includes the state of Querétaro. The Querétaro metropolitan area is also part of the fast-growing macroregion of Bajío.

== Component metropolitan areas ==
Rank	Metropolitan Area	Federative Entity	Munic.	Area (km^{2})	2020 Census	2010 Census	Change
1	Valley of Mexico	Mexico City, State of Mexico, Hidalgo	76	7,866.1	21,804,515	20,116,842	+8.39%
4	Puebla	Puebla, Tlaxcala	39	2,392.4	3,199,530	2,728,790	+17.25%
5	Toluca	State of Mexico	16	2,410.5	2,353,924	2,014,091	+16.87%
8	Querétaro	Querétaro	5	2,427.3	1,594,212	1,161,458	+37.26%
16	Cuernavaca	Morelos	8	1,189.9	1,028,589	924,964	+11.20%
32	Pachuca	Hidalgo	7	1,184.8	665,929	512,196	+30.01%
33	Tlaxcala–Apizaco	Tlaxcala	19	708.1	570,308	499,567	+14.16%
38	Cuautla	Morelos	6	979.6	483,455	434,147	+11.36%
56	Tulancingo	Hidalgo	3	673.1	268,351	239,579	+12.01%
59	Tula	Hidalgo	5	1,845.8	256,795	205,812	+24.77%
67	Tianguistenco	State of Mexico	6	304.0	183,281	157,944	+16.04%
	Mexico City megalopolis		185	19,554.3	32,408,889	28,995,390	+11.77%
