= Teziutlán =

- Town
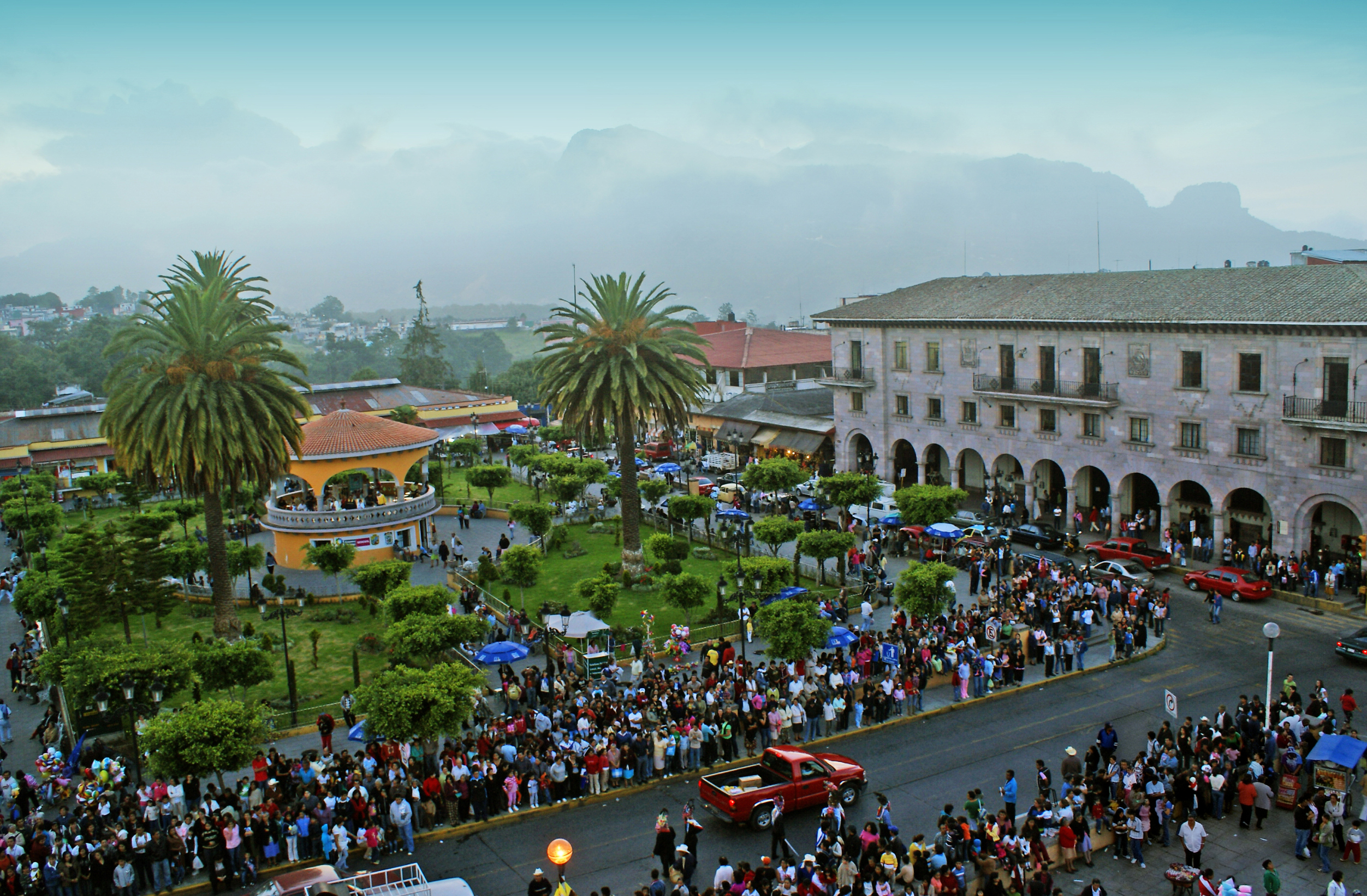
- Festival of the Virgin of Carmen in the Zocalo, 21 July 2009.

- Coat of arms
- Motto: La Perla de la Sierra; The Pearl of the Mountain Range
- Location in Mexico
- Coordinates: 19°49′04″N 97°22′00″W
- Country: Mexico
- State: Puebla
- Municipality: Teziutlán
- Founded: 1552
- Municipal Status: 1825

Government
  - Municipal President: Lic. Carlos Enrique Peredo Grau

Area
  - Total: 85.48 km^{2} (33.00 sq mi)
- Elevation: 1,990 m (6,530 ft)

Population (2020)
  - Total: 62,849
- Time zone: UTC-6 (CST)
- Demonym: Teziuteca/o
- Website: (in Spanish) Official site

Teziutlán is a city in the northeast of the Mexican state of Puebla. Its 2005 census population was 60,597. It also serves as the municipal seat for the surrounding Teziutlán Municipality. The municipality has an area of 84.2 km^{2} (32.51 sq mi) and a population of 88,970.

In 2023, Teziutlán was designated a Pueblo Mágico by the Mexican government, recognizing its cultural and historical importance.

== History ==
Teziutlán was founded by Spaniards on 15 March 1552 at a location known to the locals as "Teziuhyotepetzintlan". means "Little mount with hailstones". The name Teziutlán is Nahuatl, and means "place with hailstones".

During the presidency of Porfirio Díaz, the town gained prosperity. It was linked to the expanding railway network.

== Geography ==
The municipality has an area of 84.2 km.

Teziutlán is located at 19°49′N 97°22′W, close to the border with Veracruz, in the Sierra Madre Oriental. The area is drained by the Río El Calvario, Río Xóloatl and Río Xoloco rivers.

=== Climate ===
The climate is highland subtropical but ever moist (Köppen: Cfb) similar to the plateaus of southern Brazil, but with longer soft periods of time.

Climate data for Teziutlán
Month	Jan	Feb	Mar	Apr	May	Jun	Jul	Aug	Sep	Oct	Nov	Dec	Year
Record high °C (°F)	26.5 (79.7)	29.0 (84.2)	32.0 (89.6)	30.0 (86.0)	35.0 (95.0)	30.0 (86.0)	30.0 (86.0)	26.0 (78.8)	27.0 (80.6)	27.0 (80.6)	29.0 (84.2)	26.5 (79.7)	35.0 (95.0)
Mean daily maximum °C (°F)	16.2 (61.2)	17.1 (62.8)	20.2 (68.4)	21.8 (71.2)	22.0 (71.6)	20.7 (69.3)	19.8 (67.6)	19.4 (66.9)	18.8 (65.8)	17.3 (63.1)	17.1 (62.8)	16.5 (61.7)	18.9 (66.0)
Daily mean °C (°F)	11.2 (52.2)	12.0 (53.6)	14.8 (58.6)	16.5 (61.7)	16.8 (62.2)	16.2 (61.2)	15.2 (59.4)	15.1 (59.2)	15.0 (59.0)	13.5 (56.3)	12.6 (54.7)	11.7 (53.1)	14.2 (57.6)
Mean daily minimum °C (°F)	6.2 (43.2)	6.9 (44.4)	9.4 (48.9)	11.1 (52.0)	11.6 (52.9)	11.6 (52.9)	10.6 (51.1)	10.8 (51.4)	11.1 (52.0)	9.7 (49.5)	8.0 (46.4)	6.8 (44.2)	9.5 (49.1)
Record low °C (°F)	−4.0 (24.8)	−4.0 (24.8)	−1.0 (30.2)	1.0 (33.8)	1.5 (34.7)	6.5 (43.7)	6.0 (42.8)	7.0 (44.6)	3.0 (37.4)	1.5 (34.7)	−1.5 (29.3)	−5.0 (23.0)	−5.0 (23.0)
Average precipitation mm (inches)	52 (2.0)	46 (1.8)	32 (1.3)	45 (1.8)	81 (3.2)	214 (8.4)	164 (6.5)	194 (7.6)	298 (11.7)	172 (6.8)	91 (3.6)	51 (2.0)	1,440 (56.7)
Average precipitation days (≥ 0.1 mm)	10.6	10.7	9.5	8.8	8.8	16.1	18.4	20.2	19.5	17.4	12.1	11.2	163.3
Source: WeatherBase

== Notable people ==
The city is noteworthy as the birthplace of two prominent twentieth-century politicians:

- Manuel Ávila Camacho (24 April 1897 – 13 October 1955), President of Mexico from 1940 to 1946.
- Vicente Lombardo Toledano (16 July 1894 – 16 November 1968), founder of the Confederación de Trabajadores de México (CTM).

The city has also been the birthplace of other prominent figures:

- Maximino Ávila Camacho, brother of Manuel Ávila Camacho, governor of Puebla and federal secretary of public works.
- Juan Cordero (16 May 1824 – 28 May 1884), an award-winning painter.
- Antonio Espino Mora (13 August 1910 – 24 November 1993), who starred on stage, screen, and television as "Clavillazo".
- Alfredo "El Güero" Gil (5 January 1915 – 10 September 1999), lead guitarist for El Trío Los Panchos.
- Xavier Robles (b. 25 February 1949), motion picture screenwriter whose credits include Rojo Amanecer.
- Cayetano Arámburo (b. 29 July 1990) Mexican series/soap opera actor.
