= Tijuana metropolitan area =

Metropolitan area in Baja California, Mexico

Tijuana Metropolitan Area
- Metropolitan Area
- Zona Metropolitana de Tijuana (Spanish)
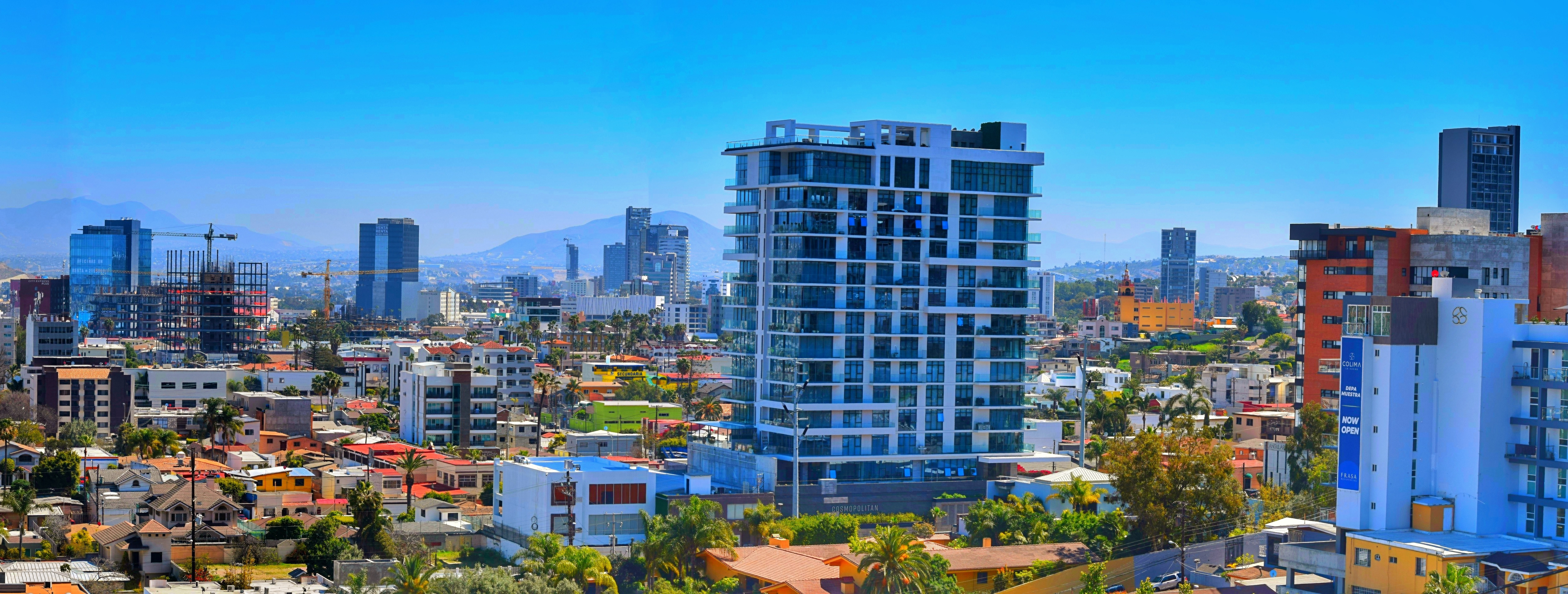
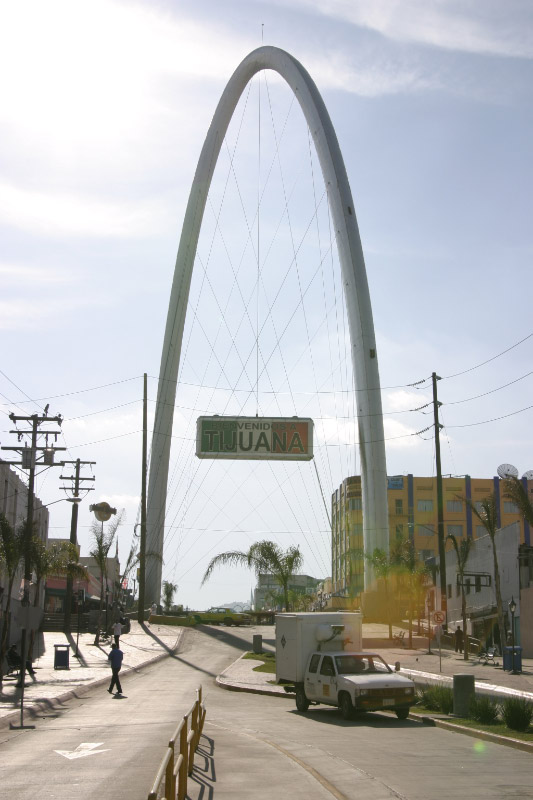
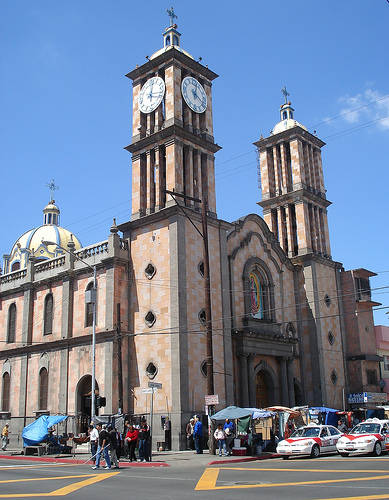
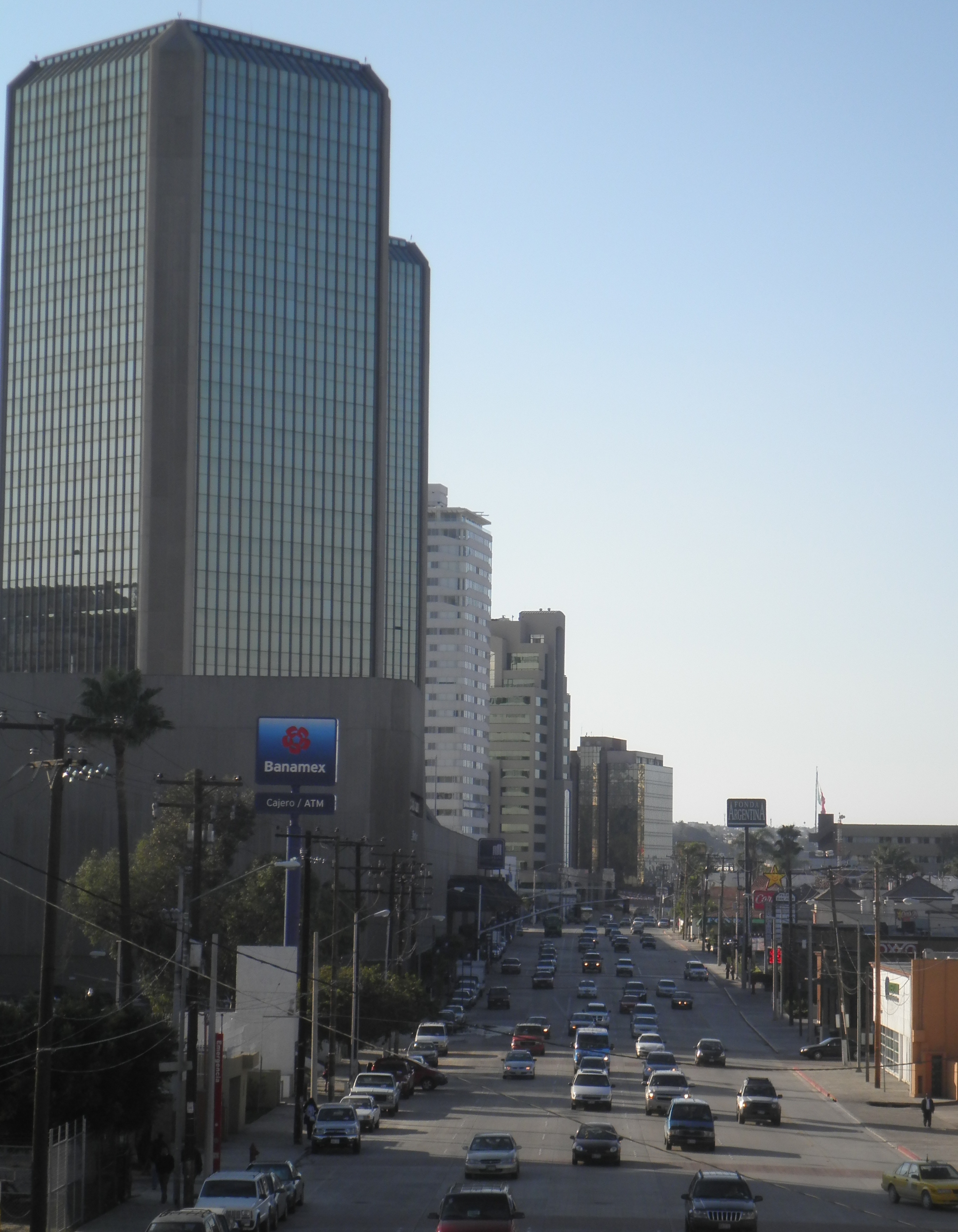
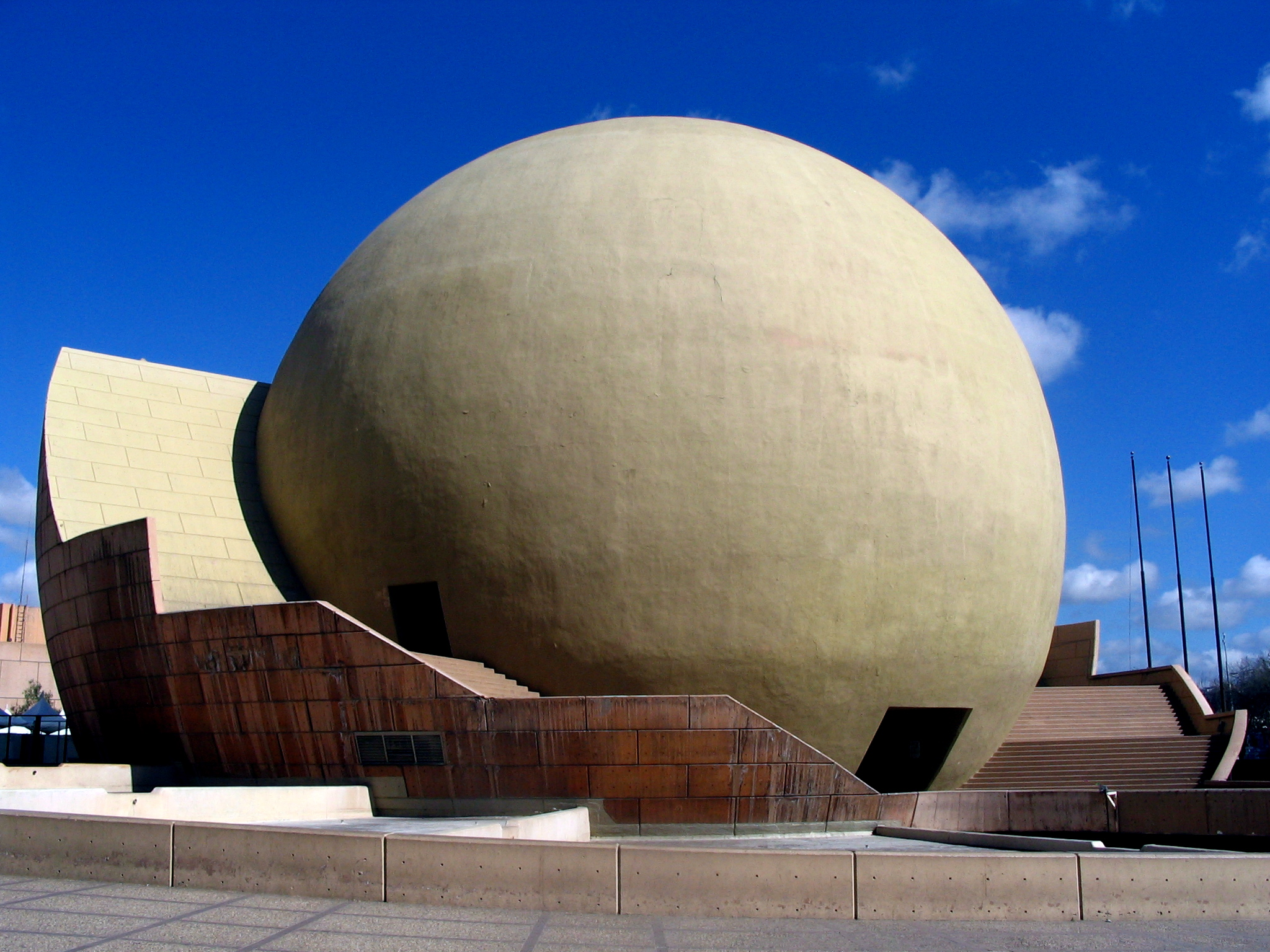
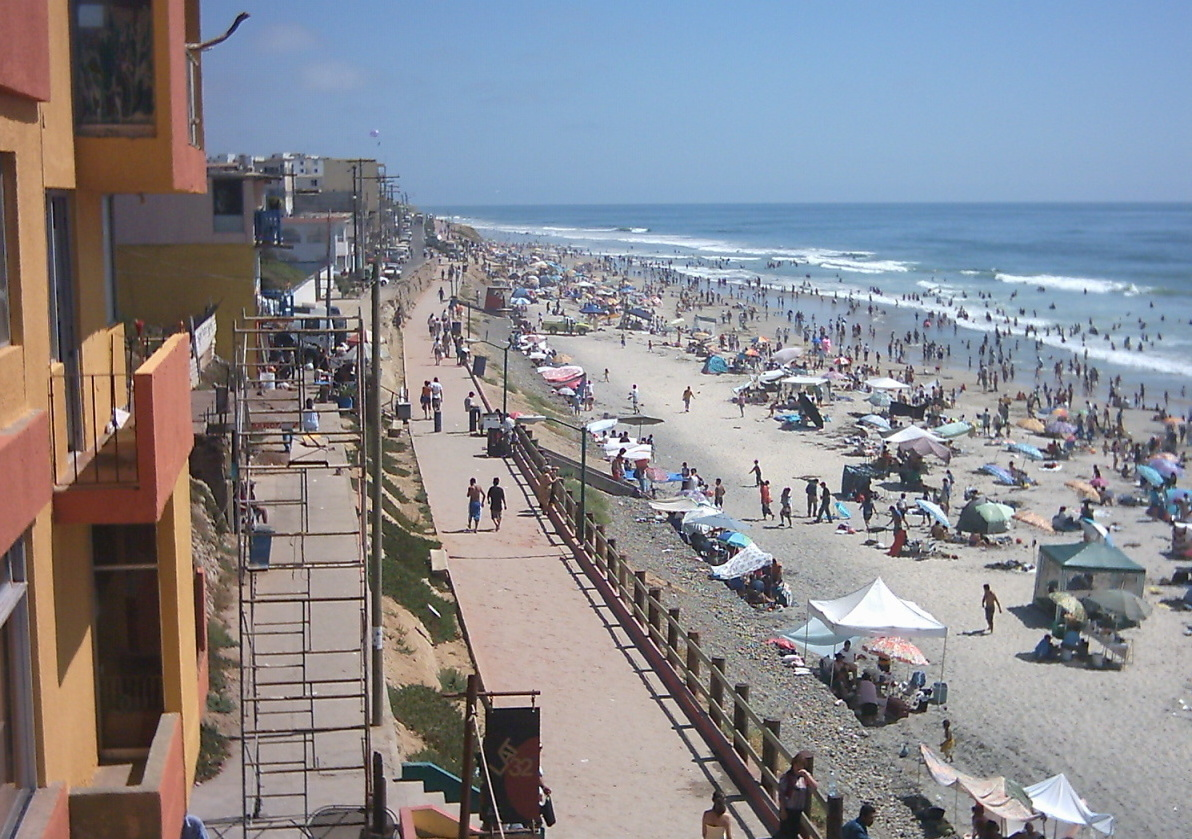
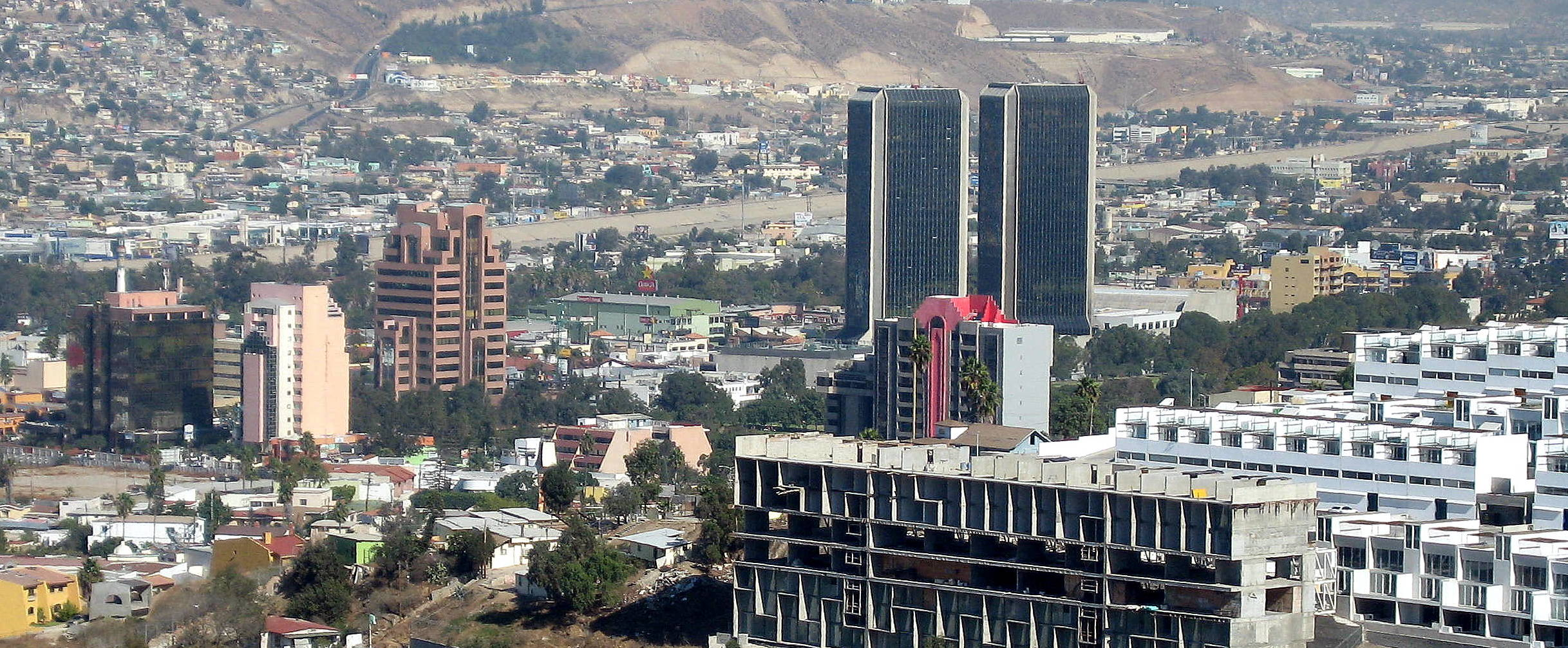
- Skyline of Tijuana Arco Monumental Tijuana Cathedral Grand Hotel Tijuana Tijuana Cultural Center Playas de Tijuana Panoramic view of Tijuana
Interactive Map of Tijuana Metropolitan Area
City of Tijuana / Ciudad de Tijuana
Tijuana Metro Area / Zona Metropolitana
- Country: Mexico
- State(s): Baja California
- Largest city: Tijuana

Population
  - Total: 2,157,853
- Time zone: UTC−08:00 (Zona Noroeste)
  - Summer (DST): UTC–07:00 (DST)

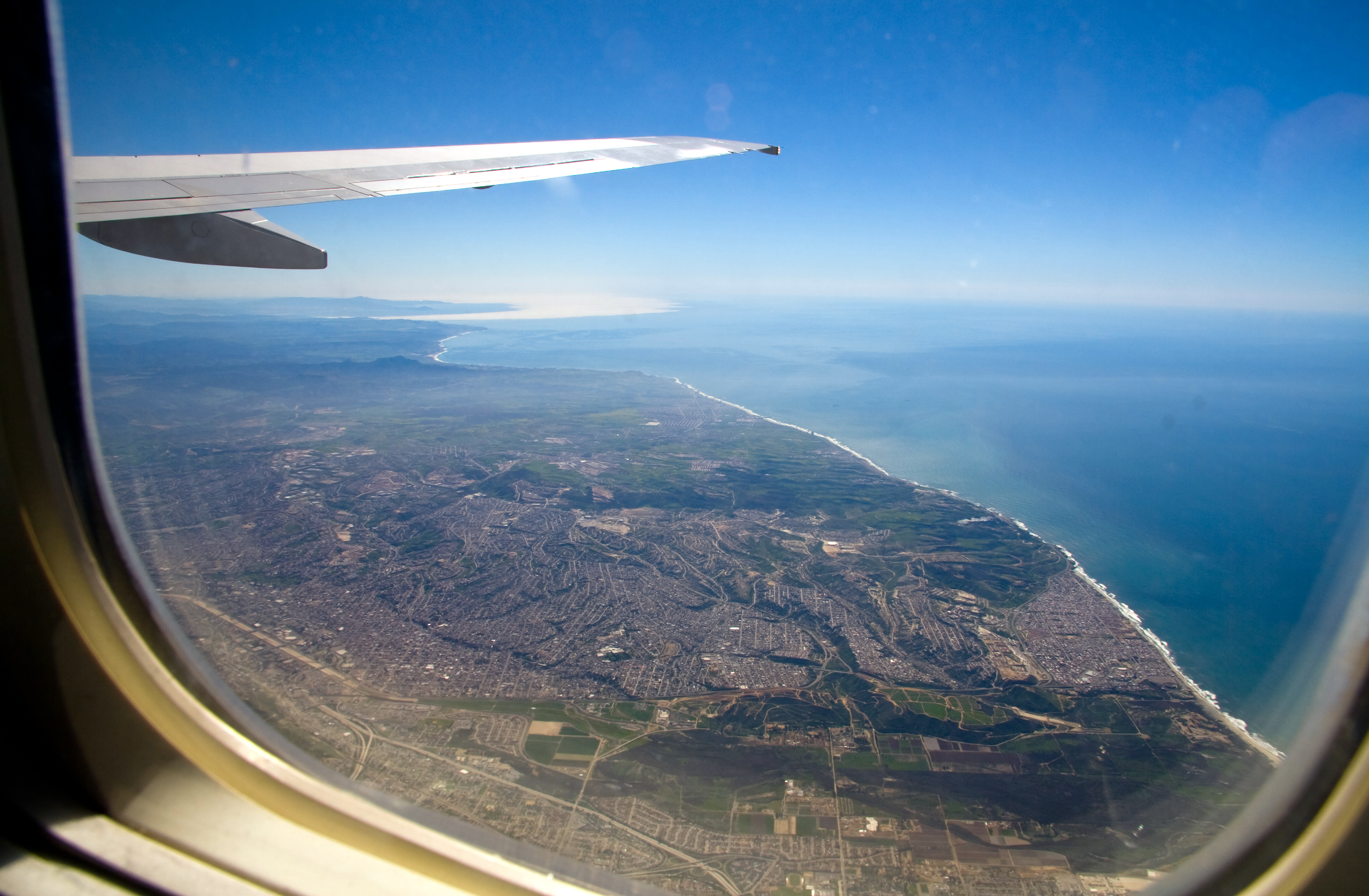
Western TJ Metro

The Tijuana metropolitan area (Spanish: Zona Metropolitana de Tijuana) is located by the Pacific Ocean in Mexico. The 2010 census placed the Tijuana metropolitan area as the fifth largest city by population in the country with 1,751,302 people. The metropolitan area is defined by the census bureau as comprising three municipalities: Tijuana, Tecate, and Rosarito Beach. However, Tecate Municipality is commonly included. As the urban area between Tijuana and Tecate grows, the commuting populace increases – ultimately further developing the southern areas of San Diego–Tijuana – and the three municipalities maintain strong relationships and cooperation.

Historical population
Year	Pop.	±%
1990	798,937	—
1995	1,100,817	+37.8%
2000	1,352,035	+22.8%
2005	1,575,026	+16.5%
2010	1,751,430	+11.2%
2015	1,840,710	+5.1%
2020	2,157,853	+17.2%

== See also ==
- San Diego metropolitan area
- Metropolitan areas of Mexico
