= León metropolitan area =

León Metropolitan Area
- Metropolitan Area
- Zona Metropolitana de León (Spanish)
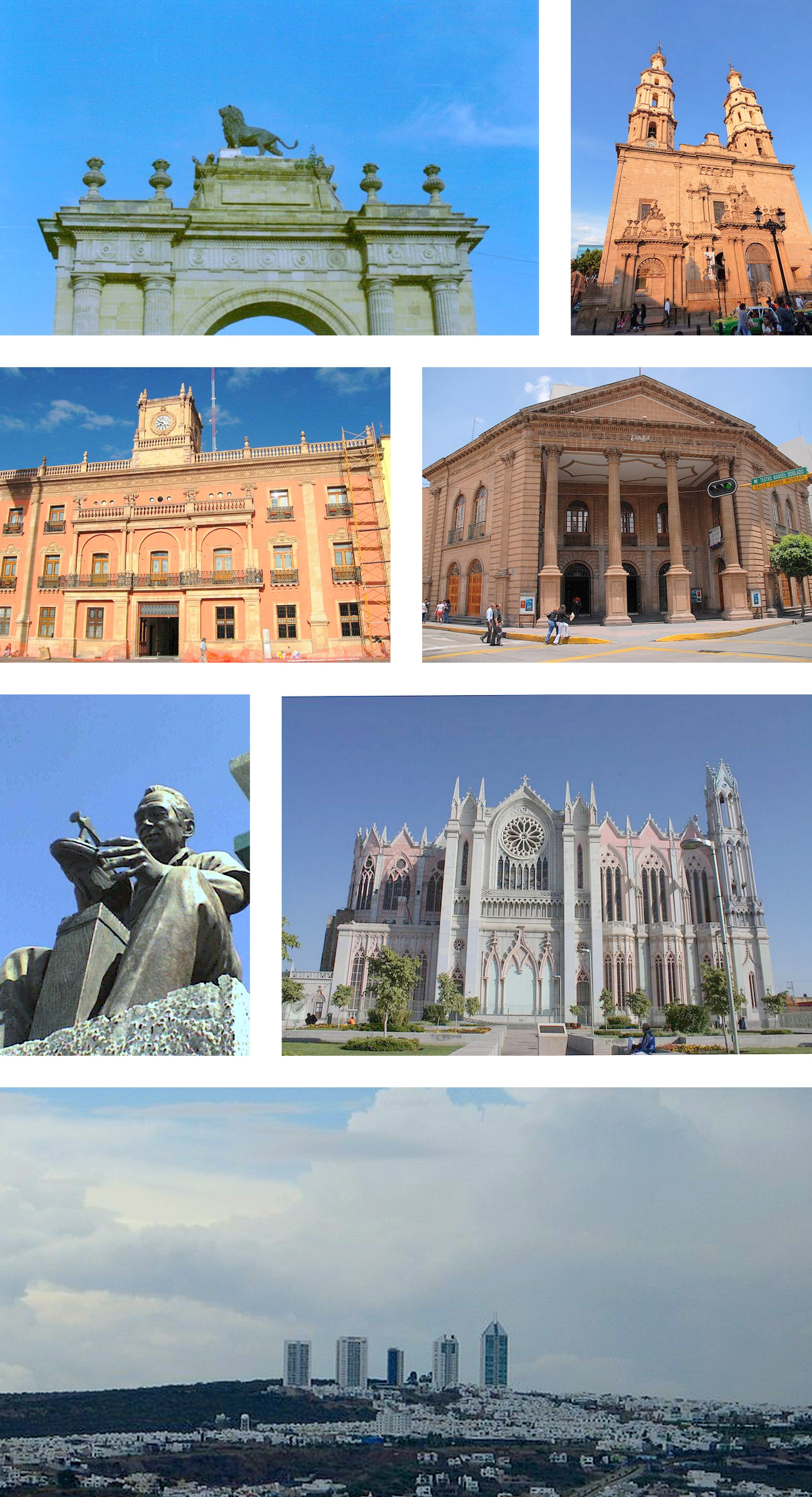
- From top to bottom from left to right: Arco de la Calzada, Metropolitan Cathedral of León, Municipal House, Manuel Doblado Theater, Monument to Footwear, Expiatory Temple and View of wealthy neighborhoods of León
Interactive Map of León Metropolitan Area
City of León / Ciudad de León
Silao de la Victoria (Silao)
- Country: Mexico
- State(s): Guanajuato
- Largest city: León

Area
  - Total: 75,999 sq mi (196,840 km^{2})

Population (2020)
  - Total: 1,936,733

GDP (PPP, constant 2015 values)
  - Year: 2023
  - Total: $39.4 billion
  - Per capita: $20,800
- Time zone: UTC−6 (CST)

The metropolitan area of León is the seventh most populated metropolitan area in Mexico, with nearly 1,609,717 inhabitants. It includes the core city of León, Guanajuato, with a population of 1,436,733. The metropolitan area also includes the municipality of Silao, all situated in the state of Guanajuato, Mexico.

== See also ==
- Metropolitan Areas of Mexico
