= Querétaro metropolitan area =

- Metropolitan Area
- Zona Metropolitana de Querétaro (Spanish)
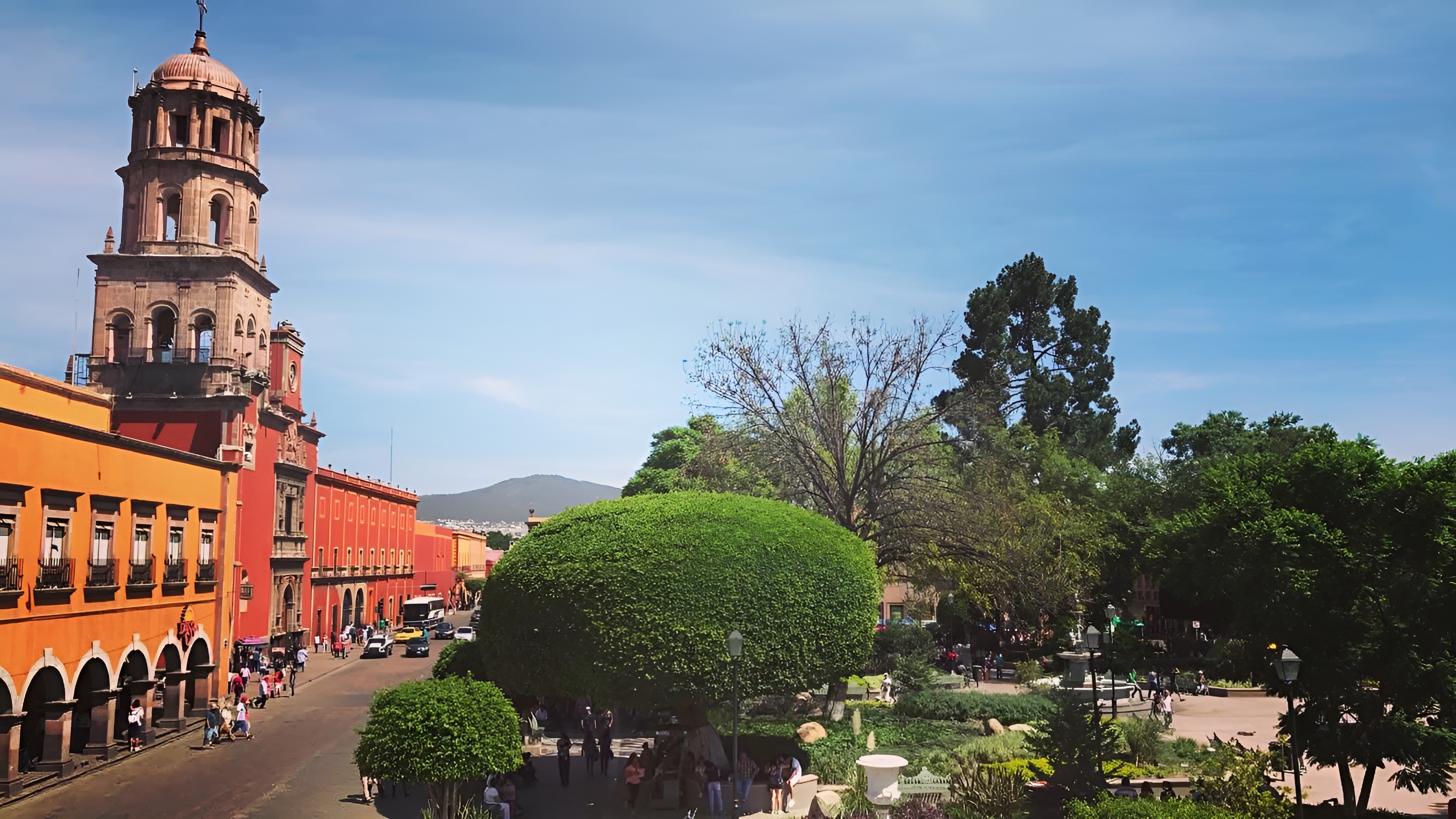
- Church of St. Francis of Assisi
Interactive Map of Querétaro Metropolitan Area
City of Querétaro / Ciudad de Querétaro
Querétaro Metro Area / Zona Metropolitana
- Country: Mexico
- State(s): Querétaro; Guanajuato
- Largest city: Querétaro
- Other cities: Apaseo el Alto; Corregidora; Huimilpan; El Marqués

Population (2020)
  - Total: 1,594,912
- Time zone: UTC−6 (CST)

The Querétaro metropolitan area (Spanish: Zona metropolitana de Querétaro) is a metropolitan area located in the state of Querétaro in Mexico. It is a set of suburbs close to Querétaro City, in the state of Querétaro. According to the last count and official delimitation carried out in 2020 jointly by INEGI, CONAPO and SEDESOL, it had a population of 1,594,912, making it the eighth most populous metropolitan area in Mexico.

== Population ==
Municipality	Population (2020)
Querétaro	1,049,777
Corregidora	212,567
El Marqués	231,668
Apaseo el Alto	64,443
Huimilpan	36,808

== See also ==
- Metropolitan Areas of Mexico
