= Pachuquilla =

Town in Hidalgo, Mexico

Pachuquilla is a Mexican town in the State of Hidalgo, 2,420 meters (7,940 feet) above sea level. In 1958, it became the municipal seat of Mineral de la Reforma. The name Pachuquilla was adopted from the nearby city of Pachuca de Soto, which means Little Pachuca in English.

== Demographics ==
Its population is 127,404. The literacy rate is 96.84% (2.8% of the male and 3.39% of the female population are illiterate) and their school attendance rate is 73.11%. In 2005, Pachuquilla had the 19th highest Human Development Index score in Mexico.

Pachuquilla in Mexico

Population(in 2010)	29,797
Latitude of Pachuquilla	20°04′18″N
Longitude of Pachuquilla	98°41′47″W
Altitude of Pachuquilla	2 400 m
GMT time in Pachuquilla	-6 hours

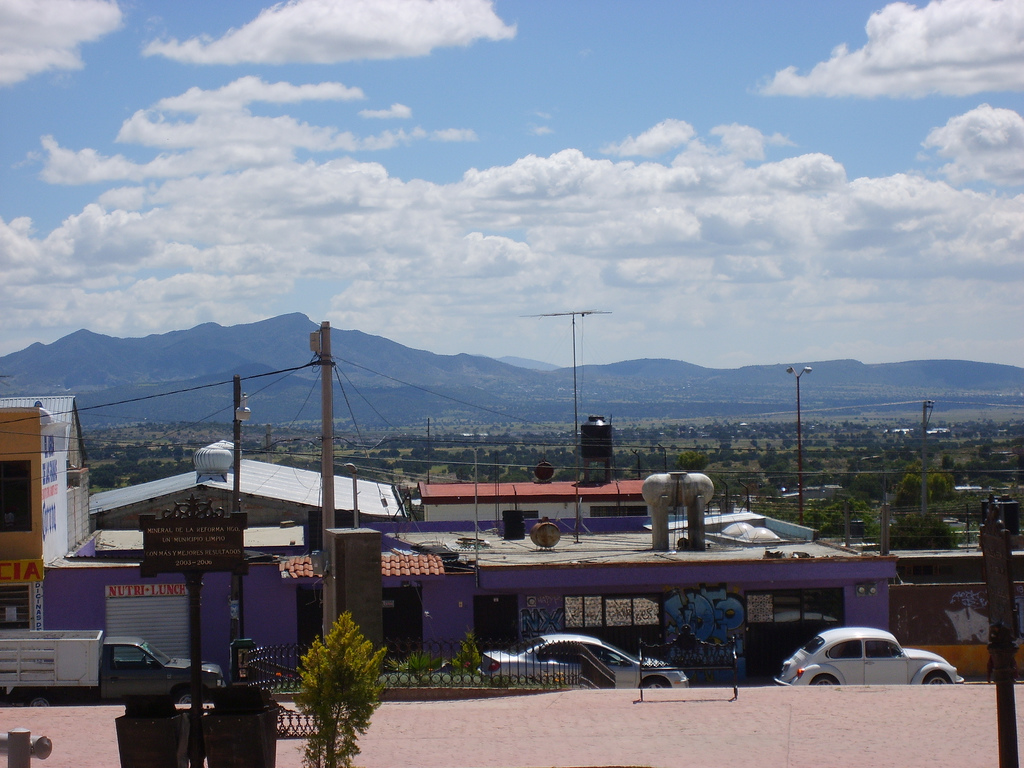
Panoramic view of Pachuquilla

== Geography ==
=== Climate ===
The climate in Pachuquilla is mostly temperate and dry. It is hotter in early summer with rainfall in the later summer months.It is a suburban place. The wind blows from south to west and low humidity prevails mainly in the months of February, thru April. The average annual temperature is 14.2 °C (57.56 °F), with a maximum temperature of 31.4 °C (88.52 °F ) and a minimum temperature of 3 °C (37.4 °F). The average annual rainfall is 387 mm (15.2 in), while atmospheric pressure stays around 574 mm (22.6 in) Hg.
