= Mineral de la Reforma =

- Municipality
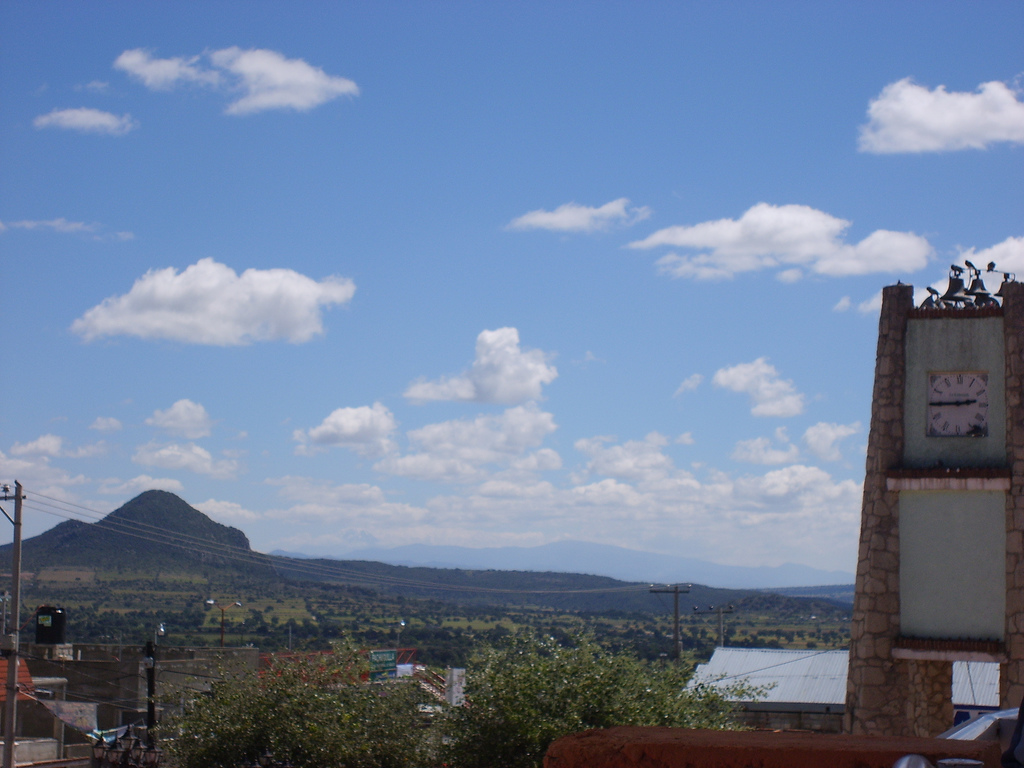

- Coat of arms
- Interactive map of Mineral de la Reforma
- Location within Hidalgo Location within Mexico
- Coordinates: 20°09′N 98°26′W
- Country: Mexico
- State: Hidalgo
- Municipal seat: Pachuquilla

Government
  - Federal electoral district: Hidalgo's 3rd

Area
  - Total: 106 km^{2} (41 sq mi)

Population (2005)
  - Total: 68,704
  - Density: 648/km^{2} (1,680/sq mi)
- Website: mineraldelareforma.gob.mx

Mineral de la Reforma is one of the 84 municipalities of Hidalgo, in central-eastern Mexico. Adjacent to the state capital at Pachuca, it is one of Hidalgo's fastest-growing areas. As of 2005, the municipality had a total population of 68,704.

Its population is estimated at 89,509 inhabitants in 2009 (Coplaco). The municipal seat lies at Pachuquilla. The municipality covers an area of 106 km^{2} (41 sq mi).

== Population ==
According to the INEGI's 2010 general census of population and housing, Mineral de la Reforma is the third largest city in the state of Hidalgo, registering 127.404 inhabitants, with an annual average growth of 11.2%.
