= Teziutlán (municipality) =

Coordinates: 19.8175°N 97.3608°W

- Municipality
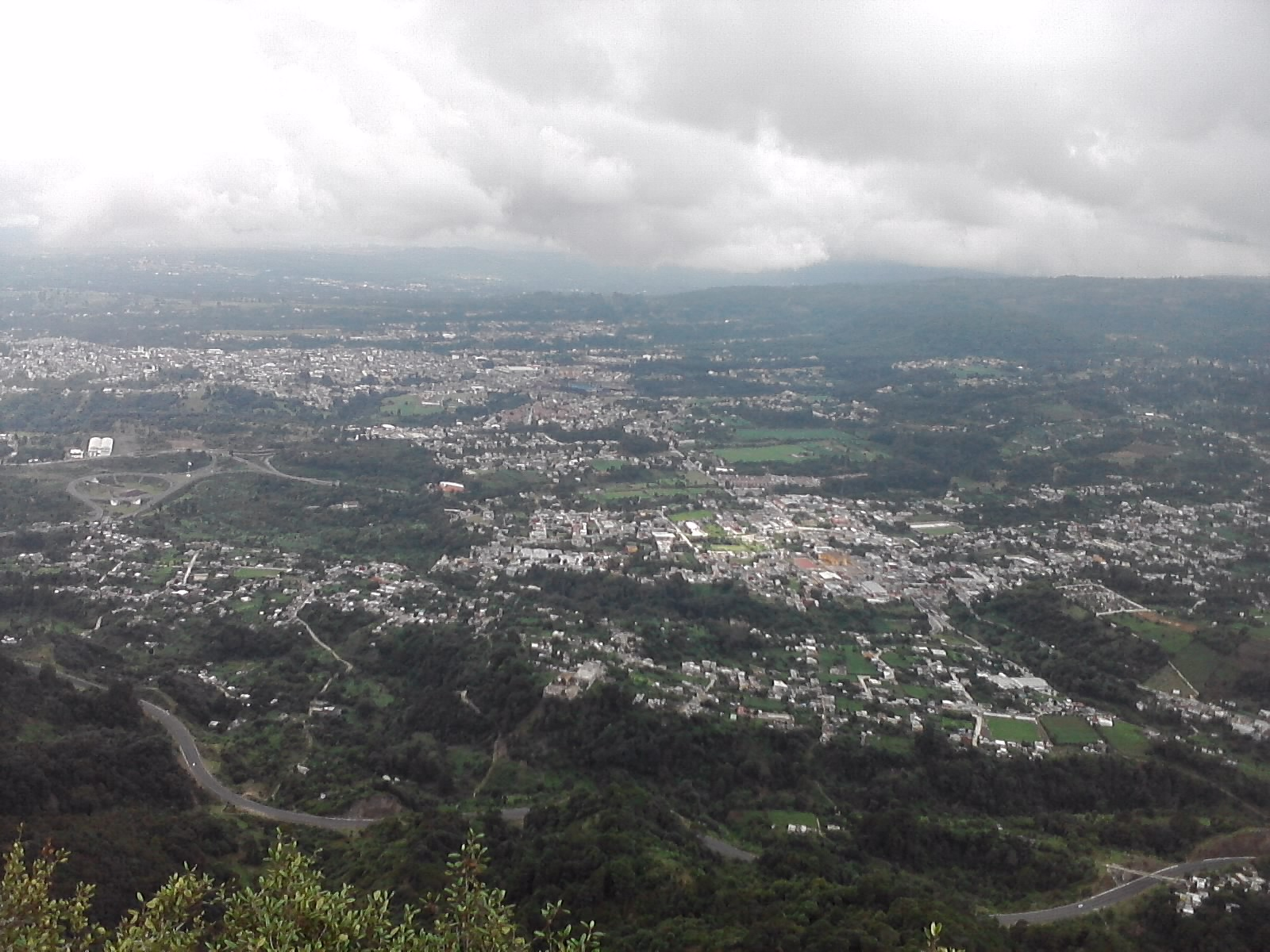

- Coat of arms
- Interactive map of Teziutlán
- Country: Mexico
- State: Puebla

Population (2020)
  - Total: 103,583
- Time zone: UTC-6 (Zona Centro)

Teziutlán is a municipality in the Mexican state of Puebla.
