= List of cities by GDP =

Cities by gross domestic product

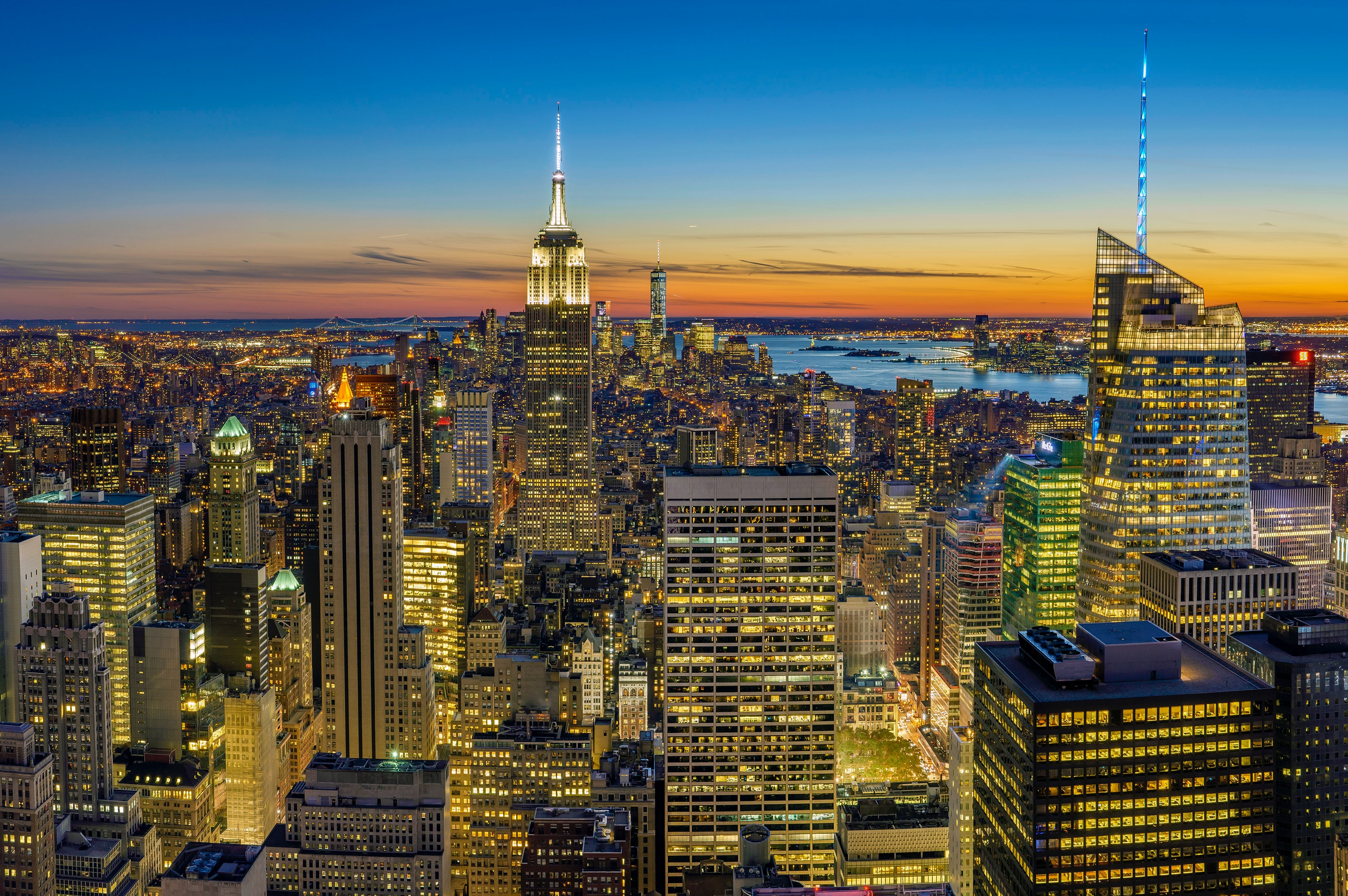
Manhattan, the economic anchor of the New York metropolitan area, the world’s principal fintech and financial center and epicenter of the world's economy, and the largest metropolitan economy in the world, with a 2026 nominal gross metropolitan product of US$2.6 trillion

This is a list of cities in the world by nominal gross domestic product (GDP). The United Nations uses three definitions for what constitutes a city, as not all cities may be classified using the same criteria. Cities may be defined as the cities proper, by the extent of their urban area, or their metropolitan regions. The methodology of calculating GDP may differ between the studies and are widely based on projections and sometimes approximate estimations, notably for cities that are not within the OECD. Refer to sources for more information. GDP for cities that have different sources might not be comparable as the definition of a city differs between them.

== List ==
Cities by GDP
City proper/metropolitan area	Country/region	GDP (billion US$)	Population	GDP (US$) per capita
A Coruña metropolitan area	(European Union) Spain	32.344 (2021)	1,121,758 (2021)	28,833
Aalborg	(European Union) Denmark	30.46 (2022)	591,740 (2022)	51,475
Aarhus	(European Union) Denmark	53.383 (2022)	913,861 (2022)	58,415
Aba, Nigeria	Nigeria	6.6 (2023)	1,190,000 (2023)	5,546
Abakaliki	Nigeria	1.7 (2023)	660,000 (2023)	2,576
Abbotsford, British Columbia	Canada	7.848 (2022)	208,961 (2022)	37,557
Abeokuta	Nigeria	2.4 (2023)	570,000 (2023)	4,211
Aberdeen, Scotland	United Kingdom	25.108 (2023)	492,070 (2023)	51,025
Abidjan	Ivory Coast	72 (2026)	6,700,000 (2026)	10,700
Abilene, TX MSA	United States	10.306623 (2023)	181,591 (2023)	56,757
Abu Dhabi	United Arab Emirates	160 (2025)	2,300,000 (2025)	69,565
Abuja	Nigeria	39 (2026)	4,200,000 (2026)	9,200
Acapulco	Mexico	5.5 (2023)	1,020,000 (2023)	5,392
Addis Ababa	Ethiopia	61.2 (2023)	5,400,000 (2023)	11,333
Adelaide	Australia	64.461 (2018–19)	1,344,368 (2018–19)	47,949
Ado Ekiti	Nigeria	2 (2023)	540,000 (2023)	3,704
Agadir	Morocco	4.5 (2024)	1,000,000 (2024)	4,500
Agra	India	3.6 (2023)	2,370,000 (2023)	1,519
Aguascalientes (city)	Mexico	15.4 (2023)	1,160,000 (2023)	13,276
Ahmedabad	India	48.6 (2023)	8,650,000 (2023)	5,618
Ahvaz	Iran	12.8 (2024)	1,310,000 (2024)	9,771
Aix-Marseille-Provence Metropolis	(European Union) France	119 (2026)	1,961,169 (2026)	61,900
Akron, OH MSA	United States	47.285487 (2023)	698,398 (2023)	
Akure	Nigeria	3 (2023)	740,000 (2023)	4,054
Al Ain	United Arab Emirates	34.2 (2024)	660,000 (2024)	51,818
Al Diwaniyah	Iraq	3.2 (2024)	590,000 (2024)	5,424
Albany, GA MSA	United States	7.782093 (2023)	145,508 (2023)	
Albany-Lebanon, OR MSA	United States	6.441520 (2023)	130,467 (2022)	
Albany-Schenectady-Troy, NY MSA	United States	84.910398 (2023)	1,238,717 (2023)	
Albuquerque, NM MSA	United States	59.382941 (2023)	922,296 (2023)	
Alexandria	Egypt	42 (2026)	5,900,000 (2024)	7,080
Alexandria, LA MSA	United States	7.753574 (2023)	148,171 (2023)	
Algiers	Algeria	117.3 (2026)	8,700,000 (2026)	13,430
Alicante metropolitan area	(European Union) Spain	50.250 (2023)	2,075,553 (2026)	24,210
Allentown-Bethlehem-Easton, PA-NJ MSA	United States	59.890990 (2023)	873,555 (2023)	
Almaty	Kazakhstan	61.406 (2024)	2,625,000 (2024)	23,393
Altoona, PA MSA	United States	7.681160 (2023)	120,273 (2023)	
Alxa	China	5.808 (2024)	268,850 (2024)	21,603
Amarah	Iraq	3.1 (2024)	750,000 (2024)	4,133
Amarillo, TX MSA	United States	18.913682 (2023)	272,395 (2023)	
Ames, IA MSA	United States	8.615031 (2023)	125,156 (2023)	
Amiens	(European Union) France	19.467 (2021)	567,745 (2021)	28,992
Amman	Jordan	15.4 (2024)	3,030,000 (2024)	5,083
Anápolis	Brazil	3.7 (2023)	400,000 (2023)	9,250
Anchorage, AK MSA	United States	34.065381 (2023)	401,314 (2023)	
Angers Loire Métropole	(European Union) France	29.514 (2021)	822,488 (2021)	30,341
Ankara	Turkey	142.3 (2024)	5,150,000 (2024)	27,631
Ann Arbor, MI MSA	United States	33.013856 (2023)	365,536 (2023)	
Annaba	Algeria	2.1 (2024)	370,000 (2024)	5,676
Annecy	(European Union) France	30.128 (2021)	841,639 (2021)	
Anniston-Oxford, AL MSA	United States	5.891059 (2023)	116,429 (2023)	
Anshan	China	80.968 (2020)	2,625,000 (2020)	30,845
Antananarivo	Madagascar	13.007 (2026)	4,200,000	3,050
Antipolo	(ASEAN) Philippines	6.1 (2023)	950,000 (2023)	6,421
Antofagasta	Chile	7.8 (2023)	460,000 (2023)	16,957
Aracaju	Brazil	6 (2023)	1,100,000 (2023)	5,455
Arak, Iran	Iran	4.3 (2024)	580,000 (2024)	7,414
Ardabil	Iran	3.9 (2024)	610,000 (2024)	6,393
Antwerp metropolitan area	(European Union) Belgium	65.467 (2022)	1,067,117 (2022)	
Appleton, Wisconsin metropolitan area	United States	18.532326 (2023)	246,433 (2023)	
Arequipa metropolitan area	Peru	7 (2023)	960,000 (2023)	7,292
Armenia, Colombia	Colombia	2.1 (2023)	420,000 (2023)	5,000
Arnhem–Nijmegen metropolitan area	(European Union) Netherlands	37.694 (2021)	744,715 (2021)	
Asheville, NC MSA	United States	29.014297 (2023)	417,202 (2023)	
Astana	Kazakhstan	32.517 (2024)	1,530,000 (2024)	21,253
Asturias metropolitan area	(European Union) Spain	32.485 (2024)	1,021,733 (2026)	
Asunción	Paraguay	31 (2023)	3,510,000 (2023)	8,832
Aswan	Egypt	2 (2024)	370,000 (2024)	5,405
Asyut	Egypt	2.6 (2024)	490,000 (2024)	5,306
Athens Metropolitan Area	(European Union) Greece	97.709 (2021)	3,547,391 (2021)	
Athens-Clarke County, GA MSA	United States	13.768348 (2023)	222,060 (2023)	
Atlanta-Sandy Springs-Roswell, GA (Metropolitan Statistical Area)	United States	634 (2025)	6,500,000 (2025)	97,538
Atlantic City-Hammonton, NJ MSA	United States	18.726628 (2023)	369,823 (2023)	
Auburn-Opelika, AL MSA	United States	8.799349 (2023)	201,585 (2023)	
Auckland	New Zealand	103.00 (2026)	1,540,000 (2026)	66,883
Augusta-Richmond County, GA-SC MSA	United States	37.292712 (2023)	629,429 (2023)	
Austin-Round Rock, TX (Metropolitan Statistical Area)	United States	286 (2025)	2,600,000 (2025)	110,000
Bacoor	(ASEAN) Philippines	4.2 (2023)	740,000 (2023)	5,676
Bahawalpur	Pakistan	2.3 (2024)	940,000 (2024)	2,447
Baghdad	Iraq	40.2 (2024)	7,920,000 (2024)	5,076
Bahía Blanca	Argentina	3.8 (2023)	320,000 (2023)	11,875
Bakersfield, CA MSA	United States	59.846810 (2023)	916,108 (2022)	
Balikpapan-Samarinda Metropolitan	(ASEAN) Indonesia	29.901 (2021)	2,621,877 (2021)	
Ballarat	Australia	4.460 (2018–19)	108,491 (2018–19)	
Baltimore-Columbia-Towson, MD (Metropolitan Statistical Area)	United States	275.427 (2024)	2,853,522 (2024)	96,522
Bandar Abbas	Iran	4.4 (2024)	680,000 (2024)	6,471
Bandung Metropolitan	(ASEAN) Indonesia	42.626 (2025)	7,000,000 (2025)	6,089
Bangkok Metropolitan Region	Thailand	293.6 (2026)	18,700,000 (2026)	15,668
Bangor, ME MSA	United States	9.020616 (2023)	155,312 (2023)	
Banjarmasin Metropolitan	(ASEAN) Indonesia	6.017 (2021)	2,164,485 (2021)	2,778
Baotou	China	64.242 (2024)	2,766,900 (2024)	23,218
Baqubah	Iraq	2.3 (2024)	370,000 (2024)	6,216
Barcelona metropolitan area	(European Union) Spain	226.6 (2023)	6,016,426 (2026)	37,664
Barisal	Bangladesh	1.2 (2024)	550,000 (2024)	2,182
Barnstable Town, MA MSA	United States	18.186673 (2023)	231,735 (2023)	
Barrie	Canada	7.98 (2022)	228,979 (2022)	
Basilan	(ASEAN) Philippines	1.9 (2023)	580,000 (2023)	3,276
Basra	Iraq	7.1 (2024)	1,490,000 (2024)	4,765
Batam Metropolitan	(ASEAN) Indonesia	16.006 (2021)	1,450,000 (2021)	
Batangas City	(ASEAN) Philippines	2.1 (2023)	370,000 (2023)	5,676
Batna (city)	Algeria	2.1 (2024)	350,000 (2024)	6,000
Baton Rouge, LA MSA	United States	68.827180 (2023)	873,661 (2023)	
Battle Creek, MI MSA	United States	8.543282 (2023)	133,366 (2023)	
Bauchi (city)	Nigeria	1.7 (2023)	670,000 (2023)	2,537
Bauru	Brazil	4 (2023)	400,000 (2023)	10,000
Bay City, MI MSA	United States	4.507259 (2023)	102,500 (2023)	
Beaumont-Port Arthur, TX MSA	United States	31.114626 (2023)	395,479 (2023)	
Beckley, WV MSA	United States	5.541536 (2023)	111,428 (2023)	
Beijing	China	730.445 (2025)	21,500,000 (2025)	33,974
Belém	Brazil	11.1 (2023)	2,300,000 (2023)	4,826
Belfast	United Kingdom	24.446 (2023)	348,005 (2022)	70,246
Belgrade	Serbia	25.31 (2021)	1,430,000 (2021)	
Belleville, Ontario	Canada	4.375 (2022)	116,013 (2022)	
Bellingham, WA MSA	United States	21.489731 (2023)	231,919 (2023)	
Belo Horizonte	Brazil	51 (2023)	5,340,000 (2023)	9,951
Bend, OR MSA	United States	15.445974 (2023)	260,919 (2023)	
Bendigo	Australia	3.961 (2018–19)	99,416 (2018–19)	
Bengaluru	India	141 (2026)	14,500,000 (2025)	21,655
Benghazi	Libya	14 (2026)	1,100,000	13,000
Benin City	Nigeria	8.2 (2023)	1,900,000 (2023)	4,316
Bergamo metropolitan area	(European Union) Italy	46.79 (2021)	1,103,556 (2021)	
Bergen Region	Norway	33 (2025)	440,000 (2025)	75,000
Berlin/Brandenburg Metropolitan Region	(European Union) Germany	306 (2025)	5,000,000 (2025)	61,200
Bern	Switzerland	57 (2025)	530,000 (2025)	107,547
Bhopal	India	6.4 (2023)	2,560,000 (2023)	2,500
Białystok metropolitan area	(European Union) Poland	7.631 (2021)	488,942 (2021)	
Biên Hòa	(ASEAN) Vietnam	7.9 (2023)	1,110,000 (2023)	7,117
Bilbao metropolitan area	(European Union) Spain	47.825 (2023)	1,172,830 (2026)	
Billings, MT MSA	United States	14.407832 (2023)	191,435 (2023)	
Biñan	(ASEAN) Philippines	2.3 (2023)	420,000 (2023)	5,476
Binghamton, NY MSA	United States	12.927169 (2023)	243,792 (2023)	
Birmingham (West Midlands)	United Kingdom	242.839 (2023)	6,085,687 (2023)	39,903
Birmingham-Hoover, AL MSA	United States	84.566170 (2023)	1,116,857 (2022)	
Birnin Kebbi	Nigeria	1 (2023)	410,000 (2023)	2,439
Bismarck, ND MSA	United States	9.430711 (2023)	135,786 (2023)	
Blacksburg-Christiansburg, VA MSA	United States	10.166304 (2023)	165,812 (2022)	
Blida (Greater Algiers)	Algeria	3.4 (2024)	520,000 (2024)	6,538
Bloomington, IL MSA	United States	15.005648 (2023)	170,441 (2023)	
Bloomington, IN MSA	United States	9.641723 (2023)	160,874 (2023)	
Bloomsburg-Berwick, PA MSA	United States	5.613010 (2023)	83,017 (2022)	
Blumenau	Brazil	6.2 (2023)	530,000 (2023)	11,698
Boa Vista, Roraima	Brazil	2.9 (2023)	470,000 (2023)	6,170
Bogotá metropolitan area	Colombia	121.8 (2023)	11,600,000 (2023)	10,500
Bogra	Bangladesh	2.2 (2024)	940,000 (2024)	2,340
Boise, ID MSA	United States	63 (2025)	860,000 (2025)	73,256
Bologna metropolitan area	(European Union) Italy	51.008 (2021)	1,015,608 (2021)	
Bordeaux	(European Union) France	72.475 (2021)	1,661,929 (2021)	
Boston-Cambridge-Newton, MA-NH (Metropolitan Statistical Area)	United States	681 (2025)	5,000,000 (2025)	136,200
Boulder, CO MSA	United States	37.662897 (2023)	326,831 (2023)	
Bournemouth, Christchurch, Dorset and Poole	United Kingdom	18.621 (2023)	404,050 (2023)	46,086
Bucaramanga	Colombia	11 (2023)	1,390,000 (2023)	7,914
Bowling Green, KY MSA	United States	11.830435 (2023)	188,840 (2023)	
Brantford	Canada	5.589 (2022)	158,391 (2022)	
Brasília	Brazil	80 (2025)	3,200,000 (2025)	25,000
Brașov	(European Union) Romania	9.347 (2021)	553,256 (2021)	
Bratislava metropolitan area	(European Union) Slovakia	32.338 (2022)	723,714 (2022)	
Breda	(European Union) Netherlands	38.136 (2021)	637,031 (2021)	
Bremerton-Silverdale-Port Orchard, WA MSA	United States	17.319445 (2023)	277,658 (2023)	
Brescia metropolitan area	(European Union) Italy	53.728 (2021)	1,255,709 (2021)	
Brest Métropole	(European Union) France	32.208 (2021)	919,983 (2021)	
Bridgeport-Stamford-Norwalk, CT (Metropolitan Statistical Area)	United States	116.030979 (2023)	962,946 (2022)	
Brighton & Hove	United Kingdom	16.510 (2023)	279,637 (2023)	59,041
Brisbane	Australia	180 (2025)	2,800,000 (2025)	64,286
Bristol	United Kingdom	28.328 (2023)	482,998 (2023)	58,650
Brno	(European Union) Czech Republic	31.944 (2022)	1,184,568 (2022)	
Brownsville-Harlingen, TX MSA	United States	15.602248 (2023)	426,710 (2023)	
Brunswick, GA MSA	United States	6.444126 (2023)	114,442 (2022)	
Brussels metropolitan area	(European Union) Belgium	263 (2025)	3,500,000 (2025)	75,143
Bucharest Metropolitan Area	(European Union) Romania	79.977 (2021)	2,327,057 (2021)	
Budapest metropolitan area	(European Union) Hungary	86.176 (2022)	3,031,887 (2022)	
Buenaventura, Valle del Cauca	Colombia	2.4 (2023)	480,000 (2023)	5,000
Buffalo-Niagara Falls, NY (Metropolitan Statistical Area)	United States	90.716457 (2023)	1,155,604 (2023)	
Buraydah, Saudi Arabia	Saudi Arabia	19.5 (2024)	730,000 (2024)	26,712
Burgas	(European Union) Bulgaria	3.914 (2021)	409,750 (2021)	
Burlington, NC MSA	United States	8.624438 (2023)	179,165 (2023)	
Burlington-South Burlington, VT MSA	United States	18.671208 (2023)	227,942 (2023)	
Bursa	Turkey	37 (2022)	2,175,000 (2022)	
Busan-Gyeongnam Area	South Korea	252.145 (2022)	5,115,000 (2022)	49,295
Butuan	(ASEAN) Philippines	1.9 (2023)	380,000 (2023)	5,000
Bydgoszcz–Toruń metropolitan area	(European Union) Poland	14.079 (2021)	751,413 (2021)	
Cabuyao	(ASEAN) Philippines	2.3 (2023)	420,000 (2023)	5,476
Cần Thơ	(ASEAN) Vietnam	6 (2023)	1,870,000 (2023)	3,209
Cádiz-Jerez metropolitan area	(European Union) Spain	28.961 (2023)	1,266,061 (2026)	
Caen	(European Union) France	25.18 (2021)	695,207 (2021)	
Cairns	Australia	10.709 (2018–19)	153,951 (2019)	
Calabar	Nigeria	2.4 (2023)	660,000 (2023)	3,636
Calamba, Laguna	(ASEAN) Philippines	3.2 (2023)	570,000 (2023)	5,614
Calgary Metropolitan Region	Canada	99.848 (2022)	1,608,342 (2022)	
Cali	Colombia	22.1 (2023)	2,890,000 (2023)	7,647
California-Lexington Park, MD MSA	United States	9.882630 (2023)	114,877 (2022)	
Camagüey	Cuba	2.1 (2023)	310,000 (2023)	6,774
Campina Grande	Brazil	2.7 (2023)	520,000 (2023)	5,192
Campinas	Brazil	39.7 (2023)	2,260,000 (2023)	17,566
Campo Grande	Brazil	7.8 (2023)	930,000 (2023)	8,387
Campos dos Goytacazes	Brazil	9.8 (2023)	540,000 (2023)	18,148
Canberra	Australia	39 (2025)	490,000 (2025)	79,592
Cancún	Mexico	9.9 (2023)	1,020,000 (2023)	9,706
Cannes-Antibes	France	18 (2026)		44,700
Canton-Massillon, OH MSA	United States	24.599897 (2023)	399,474 (2023)	
Cape Coral-Fort Myers, FL MSA	United States	50.645899 (2023)	834,573 (2023)	
Cape Girardeau, MO-IL MSA	United States	5.797295 (2023)	98,223 (2023)	
Cape Town	South Africa	51.800 (2026)	5,550,000 (2026)	9,300
Caracas	Venezuela	70 (2012)	1,942,652 (2011)	
Carbondale-Marion, IL MSA	United States	7.263128 (2023)	132,693 (2022)	
Cardiff and Vale of Glamorgan	United Kingdom	24.345 (2023)	518,269 (2023)	46,974
Carson City, NV MSA	United States	4.777092 (2023)	58,036 (2023)	
Cartagena, Colombia	Colombia	8.2 (2023)	1,100,000 (2023)	7,455
Caruaru	Brazil	2 (2023)	370,000 (2023)	5,405
Casablanca	Morocco	73 (2026)	5,200,000 (2026)	5,595
Cascavel	Brazil	3.3 (2023)	350,000 (2023)	9,429
Casper, WY MSA	United States	6.983637 (2023)	79,941 (2023)	
Caxias do Sul	Brazil	8.5 (2023)	620,000 (2023)	13,710
Cebu City	(ASEAN) Philippines	44 (2026)	5,400,000 (2026)	
Cedar Rapids, IA MSA	United States	22.962630 (2023)	275,668 (2023)	
Celaya	Mexico	8 (2023)	710,000 (2023)	11,268
Central German Metropolitan Region	(European Union) Germany	335.193 (2023)	8,300,000 (2024)	40,385
Chambersburg-Waynesboro, PA MSA	United States	8.148840 (2023)	156,902 (2022)	
Champaign-Urbana, IL MSA	United States	15.512304 (2023)	235,608 (2023)	
Chandigarh	India	6 (2023)	2,575,000 (2023)	
Changchun	China	96.240 (2020)	3,700,000 (2020)	
Changde	China	54.355 (2020)	1,160,000 (2020)	
Changji	China	35.234 (2024)	1,623,350 (2024)	
Changsha	China	214.4 (2024)	10,564,800 (2024)	20,294
Changzhou	China	151.840 (2024)	5,380,500 (2024)	
Charleroi	(European Union) Belgium	16.619 (2022)	558,107 (2022)	
Charleston-North Charleston, SC MSA	United States	63.973949 (2023)	849,417 (2023)	
Charleston, WV MSA	United States	16.291494 (2023)	203,164 (2023)	
Charlotte-Concord-Gastonia, NC-SC (Metropolitan Statistical Area)	United States	277.107 (2024)	2,884,708 (2024)	96,061
Charlottesville, VA MSA	United States	18.817343 (2023)	225,127 (2023)	
Chattanooga, TN-GA MSA	United States	42.381201 (2023)	580,971 (2023)	
Chengdu	China	327.045 (2024)	21,474,000 (2024)	15,230
Chennai metropolitan area	India	62.3 (2023)	11,780,000 (2023)	5,289
Cheyenne, WY MSA	United States	8.285241 (2023)	100,984 (2023)	
Chicago-Naperville-Elgin, IL-IN-WI (Metropolitan Statistical Area)	United States	967 (2025)	9,400,000 (2025)	102,872
Chiclayo metropolitan area	Peru	4 (2023)	660,000 (2023)	6,061
Chico, CA MSA	United States	11.727399 (2023)	207,172 (2023)	
Chihuahua City	Mexico	16.8 (2023)	1,120,000 (2023)	15,000
Chilliwack	Canada	4.119 (2022)	121,802 (2022)	
Chimbote	Peru	5 (2023)	400,000 (2023)	12,500
Chittagong	Bangladesh	17.9 (2024)	5,510,000 (2024)	3,249
Chongqing	China	473.53 (2025)	31,900,000 (2024)	14,844
Chuzhou	China	56.649 (2024)	1,030,000 (2024)	
Cincinnati, OH-KY-IN (Metropolitan Statistical Area)	United States	198.888723 (2023)	2,271,479 (2023)	87,559
Ciudad del Este	Paraguay	2.2 (2023)	340,000 (2023)	6,471
Ciudad Juárez	Mexico	21.8 (2023)	1,580,000 (2023)	13,797
Ciudad Obregón	Mexico	5.7 (2023)	390,000 (2023)	14,615
Ciudad Victoria	Mexico	4.3 (2023)	380,000 (2023)	11,316
Clarksville, TN-KY MSA	United States	17.765745 (2023)	340,495 (2023)	
Clermont-Ferrand	(European Union) France	27.074 (2021)	669,014 (2021)	
Cleveland-Elyria, OH (Metropolitan Statistical Area)	United States	173.135607 (2023)	2,063,132 (2022)	
Cleveland, TN MSA	United States	6.807509 (2023)	129,612 (2023)	
Cluj-Napoca	(European Union) Romania	14.75 (2021)	710,284 (2021)	
Coatzacoalcos	Mexico	3.9 (2023)	410,000 (2023)	9,512
Cochabamba	Bolivia	5 (2023)	1,400,000 (2023)	3,571
Cocos (Keeling) Islands	Cocos (Keeling) Islands	0.011 (2010)	561 (2011)	
Coeur d'Alene, ID MSA	United States	10.583848 (2023)	185,010 (2023)	
Coimbatore	India	13.7 (2023)	3,010,000 (2023)	4,551
Coimbra	(European Union) Portugal	9.799 (2022)	438,212 (2022)	
Colima (city)	Mexico	5.3 (2023)	430,000 (2023)	12,326
College Station-Bryan, TX MSA	United States	19.585335 (2023)	281,445 (2023)	
Colombo	Sri Lanka	5.1 (2024)	640,000 (2024)	7,969
Colorado Springs, CO MSA	United States	53.092641 (2023)	768,832 (2023)	
Columbia, MO MSA	United States	13.572357 (2023)	216,511 (2023)	
Columbia, SC MSA	United States	58.497422 (2023)	858,302 (2023)	
Columbus, GA-AL MSA	United States	18.710583 (2023)	323,768 (2023)	
Columbus, IN MSA	United States	8.668346 (2023)	84,003 (2023)	
Columbus, OH (Metropolitan Statistical Area)	United States	182.087631 (2023)	2,180,271 (2023)	
Comarca Lagunera	Mexico	29.2 (2023)	1,780,000 (2023)	16,404
Comilla	Bangladesh	1.8 (2024)	670,000 (2024)	2,687
Communauté d'agglomération Nîmes Métropole	(European Union) France	23.545 (2021)	751,840 (2021)	
Communauté d'agglomération Pau Béarn Pyrénées	(European Union) France	26.395 (2021)	688,474 (2021)	
Constanța	(European Union) Romania	10.936 (2021)	668,065(2021) (2021)	
Constantine, Algeria	Algeria	2.5 (2024)	420,000 (2024)	5,952
Copenhagen metropolitan area	(European Union) Denmark	220 (2025)	2,200,000 (2025)	100,000
Córdoba	Argentina	24.9 (2023)	1,610,000 (2023)	15,466
Córdoba metropolitan area	(European Union) Spain	18.616 (2023)	770,508 (2026)	
Córdoba, Veracruz	Mexico	2.9 (2023)	370,000 (2023)	7,838
Corpus Christi, TX MSA	United States	30.930920 (2023)	448,323 (2023)	
Corrientes	Argentina	6 (2023)	420,000 (2023)	14,286
Corvallis, OR MSA	United States	6.035305 (2023)	97,713 (2023)	
Cotabato City	(ASEAN) Philippines	0.8 (2023)	350,000 (2023)	2,286
Coventry	United Kingdom	16.028 (2023)	360,702 (2023)	44,436
Craiova metropolitan area	(European Union) Romania	7.065 (2021)	615,962 (2021)	
Crestview-Fort Walton Beach-Destin, FL MSA	United States	23.794720 (2023)	304,818 (2023)	
Cuautla, Morelos	Mexico	3.6 (2023)	540,000 (2023)	6,667
Cuernavaca	Mexico	10.1 (2023)	1,120,000 (2023)	9,018
Cuenca, Ecuador	Ecuador	3.5 (2023)	440,000 (2023)	7,955
Cuiabá	Brazil	8.3 (2023)	940,000 (2023)	8,830
Culiacán	Mexico	9.4 (2023)	890,000 (2023)	10,562
Cumberland, MD-WV MSA	United States	4.359585 (2023)	94,122 (2022)	
Curitiba	Brazil	46.8 (2023)	3,600,000 (2023)	13,000
Cusco	Peru	2.3 (2023)	500,000 (2023)	4,600
Częstochowa metropolitan area	(European Union) Poland	7.931 (2021)	487,392 (2021)	
Da Nang	(ASEAN) Vietnam	5 (2023)	1,220,000 (2023)	4,098
Daegu	South Korea	50.400 (2022)	2,750,000 (2022)	
Daejeon	South Korea	40.000 (2022)	1,540,000 (2022)	
Dakar	Senegal	15 (2025)	4,100,000 (2025)	3,659
Dalian	China	133.632 (2024)	7,542,000 (2024)	
Dallas-Fort Worth-Arlington, TX (Metropolitan Statistical Area)	United States	845 (2025)	8,500,000 (2025)	99,412
Dalton, GA MSA	United States	9.271266 (2023)	144,722 (2023)	
Dammam metropolitan area	Saudi Arabia	53.5 (2024)	2,080,000 (2024)	25,721
Danville, IL MSA	United States	4.136523 (2023)	72,337 (2022)	
Daphne-Fairhope-Foley, AL MSA	United States	12.071468 (2023)	253,507 (2023)	
Daqing	China	39.538 (2024)	2,681,500 (2024)	
Dar es Salaam	Tanzania	40 (2026)	8,800,000 (2026)	4,500
Dasmariñas	(ASEAN) Philippines	4.6 (2023)	800,000 (2023)	5,750
Davenport-Moline-Rock Island, IA-IL MSA	United States	27.875132 (2023)	379,441 (2023)	
Dayton, OH MSA	United States	41.111 (2017)	803,899 (2017)	
Debrecen	(European Union) Hungary	7.085 (2022)	524,272 (2022)	
Decatur, AL MSA	United States	8.841158 (2023)	158,635 (2023)	
Decatur, IL MSA	United States	8.822934 (2023)	100,591 (2023)	
Deltona-Daytona Beach-Ormond Beach, FL MSA	United States	32.539529 (2023)	721,796 (2023)	
Denpasar Metropolitan	(ASEAN) Indonesia	9.941 (2021)	1,580,000 (2021)	
Denver-Aurora-Lakewood, CO (Metropolitan Statistical Area)	United States	346 (2025)	3,100,000 (2025)	111,613
Dera Ghazi Khan	Pakistan	1.2 (2024)	510,000 (2024)	2,353
Derby	United Kingdom	12.633 (2023)	266,460 (2023)	47,410
Des Moines-West Des Moines, IA MSA	United States	74.062506 (2023)	737,164 (2023)	
Detroit-Warren-Dearborn, MI (Metropolitan Statistical Area)	United States	348.039 (2024)	4,377,045 (2024)	79,515
Deyang	China	34.855 (2020)	3,456,161 (2020)	
Dijon Métropole	(European Union) France	23.238 (2021)	534,164 (2021)	
Djelfa	Algeria	3.7 (2024)	590,000 (2024)	6,271
Doha metropolitan area	Qatar	105 (2024)	1,930,000 (2024)	54,404
Dongguan	China	172.461 (2024)	10,528,050 (2024)	
Dongying	China	60.487 (2024)	2,207,150 (2024)	
Dothan, AL MSA	United States	9.099360 (2023)	153,349 (2023)	
Dover, DE MSA	United States	10.509748 (2023)	189,789 (2023)	
Drummondville	Canada	4.14 (2022)	104,076 (2022)	
Dubai–Sharjah–Ajman metropolitan area	United Arab Emirates	301 (2026)	7,500,000 (2026)	40,100
Dubuque, IA MSA	United States	9.017369 (2023)	98,887 (2023)	
Duluth, MN-WI MSA	United States	18.838611 (2023)	281,603 (2023)	
Durango (city)	Mexico	6.7 (2023)	670,000 (2023)	10,000
Durban	South Africa	64.700 (2022)	3,525,000 (2022)	
Durham-Chapel Hill, NC MSA	United States	76 (2025)	620,000 (2025)	122,581
East Stroudsburg, PA MSA	United States	9.215416 (2023)	167,198 (2022)	
Eau Claire, WI MSA	United States	11.674198 (2023)	174,873 (2023)	
Edinburgh	United Kingdom	45.441 (2023)	523,250 (2023)	86,844
Edmonton Metropolitan Region	Canada	81 (2025)	1,700,000 (2025)	47,647
Efon-Alaaye	Nigeria	1.4 (2023)	420,000 (2023)	3,333
Eindhoven	(European Union) Netherlands	74 (2025)	800,000 (2023)	92,500
El Centro, CA MSA	United States	13.483299 (2023)	179,057 (2023)	
El Mahalla El Kubra	Egypt	3.3 (2024)	550,000 (2024)	6,000
El Paso, TX MSA	United States	48.609163 (2023)	873,331 (2023)	
Elizabethtown-Fort Knox, KY MSA	United States	8.182312 (2023)	157,026 (2022)	
Elkhart-Goshen, IN MSA	United States	20.857760 (2023)	206,409 (2023)	
Elmira, NY MSA	United States	4.544209 (2023)	81,325 (2023)	
Enid, OK MSA	United States	3.804621 (2023)	62,023 (2023)	
Enschede	(European Union) Netherlands	30.955 (2021)	784,390 (2021)	
Ensenada Municipality	Mexico	4 (2023)	350,000 (2023)	11,429
Enugu (city)	Nigeria	3.7 (2023)	850,000 (2023)	4,353
Erbil	Iraq	5.9 (2024)	920,000 (2024)	6,413
Erie, PA MSA	United States	14.204975 (2023)	267,571 (2023)	
Eslamshahr	Iran	3 (2024)	540,000 (2024)	5,556
Eugene-Springfield, OR MSA	United States	22.550913 (2023)	381,181 (2023)	
European Metropolis of Lille	(European Union) France	101.652 (2021)	2,607,879 (2021)	
Evansville, IN-KY MSA	United States	27.437679 (2023)	314,038 (2022)	
Ezhou	China	18.834 (2024)	1,072,500 (2024)	
Fairbanks, AK MSA	United States	7.198784 (2023)	95,356 (2022)	
Faisalabad	Pakistan	9.8 (2024)	3,800,000 (2024)	2,579
Faiyum	Egypt	2.5 (2024)	440,000 (2024)	5,682
Fallujah	Iraq	1.7 (2024)	380,000 (2024)	4,474
Fangchenggang	China	16.394 (2024)	1,050,000 (2024)	
Fargo, ND-MN MSA	United States	20.535575 (2023)	262,620 (2023)	
Farmington, NM MSA	United States	6.822347 (2023)	120,675 (2023)	
Fayetteville, NC MSA	United States	28.205160 (2023)	392,336 (2023)	
Fayetteville-Springdale-Rogers, AR MSA	United States	40.776485 (2023)	590,337 (2023)	
Feira de Santana	Brazil	3.7 (2023)	620,000 (2023)	5,968
Fez, Morocco	Morocco	10.8 (2026)	1,480,000 (2026)	7,200
Flagstaff, AZ MSA	United States	9.967529 (2023)	144,472 (2023)	
Flint, MI MSA	United States	19.151079 (2023)	401,522 (2023)	
Florence, SC MSA	United States	12.505628 (2023)	199,630 (2023)	
Florence-Muscle Shoals, AL MSA	United States	7.212666 (2023)	155,175 (2023)	
Florianópolis	Brazil	11.6 (2023)	1,100,000 (2023)	10,545
Fond du Lac, WI MSA	United States	6.451530 (2023)	103,948 (2023)	
Fort Collins, CO MSA	United States	26.974178 (2023)	366,778 (2022)	
Fort Smith, AR-OK MSA	United States	12.729594 (2023)	231,280 (2023)	
Fort Wayne, IN MSA	United States	30.231008 (2023)	457,842 (2023)	
Fort-de-France	(European Union) France	10.166 (2022)	352,205 (2022)	
Fortaleza	Brazil	23.8 (2023)	3,750,000 (2023)	6,347
Foshan	China	187.622 (2024)	9,657,150 (2024)	19,428
Franca	Brazil	2.9 (2023)	410,000 (2023)	7,073
Frankfurt Rhine-Main	(European Union) Germany	307.49 (2022)	5,800,000 (2023)	53,016
Fredericton	Canada	5.159 (2022)	116,159 (2022)	
Fresno, CA MSA	United States	60.151259 (2023)	1,180,020 (2023)	
Fukuoka–Kitakyushu	Japan	182.952 (2019)	4,750,000 (2020)	38,516
Fuzhou	China	199.907 (2024)	8,485,000 (2024)	23,560
Gadsden, AL MSA	United States	3.776967 (2023)	103,241 (2023)	
Gainesville, FL MSA	United States	21.823778 (2023)	352,126 (2023)	
Gainesville, GA MSA	United States	16.640845 (2023)	217,267 (2023)	
Galati	(European Union) Romania	5.204 (2021)	495,149 (2021)	
Gboko	Nigeria	1.7 (2023)	490,000 (2023)	3,469
Gdansk metropolitan area	(European Union) Poland	28.126 (2021)	1,360,005 (2021)	
Geelong	Australia	8.725 (2018–19)	271,848 (2018–19)	
General Santos	(ASEAN) Philippines	2.7 (2023)	690,000 (2023)	3,913
General Trias	(ASEAN) Philippines	2.5 (2023)	450,000 (2023)	5,556
George Town conurbation	(ASEAN) Malaysia	30.2 (2020)	2,843,344 (2020)	
Gettysburg, PA MSA	United States	4.739846 (2023)	106,748 (2023)	
Ghent metropolitan area	(European Union) Belgium	38.834 (2022)	656,665 (2022)	
Gibraltar	Gibraltar	3.265 (2022)	32,688 (2022)	
Gipuzkoa	(European Union) Spain	30.738 (2023)	735,235 (2026)	
Gladstone	Australia	4.464 (2018–19)	45,130 (2018)	
Glasgow	United Kingdom	39.506 (2023)	631,970 (2023)	62,512
Glens Falls, NY MSA	United States	8.717091 (2023)	125,427 (2023)	
Goiânia	Brazil	19.8 (2023)	2,640,000 (2023)	7,500
Gold Coast	Australia	26.669 (2018–19)	679,127 (2018)	
Goldsboro, NC MSA	United States	6.339867 (2023)	118,686 (2023)	
Gombe, Nigeria	Nigeria	1.6 (2023)	570,000 (2023)	2,807
Gorgan	Iran	2.8 (2024)	390,000 (2024)	7,179
Gothenburg	(European Union) Sweden	104.765 (2021)	1,734,443 (2021)	
Granada metropolitan area	(European Union) Spain	22.530 (2023)	954,560 (2026)	
Grand Besançon Métropole	(European Union) France	18.888 (2021)	546,224 (2021)	
Grand Forks, ND-MN MSA	United States	6.878157 (2023)	103,120 (2023)	
Grand Genève	Switzerland	92 (2025)	640,000 (2025)	143,750
Grand Island, NE MSA	United States	5.979384 (2023)	76,479 (2023)	
Grand Junction, CO MSA	United States	9.147468 (2023)	159,681 (2023)	
Grand Poitiers communauté urbaine	(European Union) France	15.197 (2021)	439,635 (2021)	
Grand Rapids-Kentwood, MI MSA	United States	82.311400 (2023)	1,094,198 (2022)	
Grand Reims	(European Union) France	24.109 (2021)	563,998 (2021)	
Grand Tunis	Tunisia	11.8 (2024)	2,510,000 (2024)	4,701
Grants Pass, OR MSA	United States	3.877152 (2023)	87,821 (2023)	
Graz	(European Union) Austria	35.891 (2021)	646,099 (2021)	
Great Falls, MT MSA	United States	5.345805 (2023)	84,900 (2023)	
Greater Accra Region	Ghana	62 (2026)	6,900,000 (2025)	5,942
Greater Buenos Aires	Argentina	235.6 (2023)	15,490,000 (2023)	38,857
Greater Cairo	Egypt	266 (2026)	25,200,000 (2026)	10,500
Greater Concepción	Chile	13.4 (2023)	910,000 (2023)	14,725
Greater Dhaka	Bangladesh	235.00 (2025)	24,570,000 (2024)	5,164
Greater Dublin Area	(European Union) Ireland	371 (2025)	2,300,000 (2025)	161,304
Greater Kuala Lumpur	(ASEAN) Malaysia	218 (2026)	9,400,000 (2025)	19,574
Greater La Serena	Chile	6.9 (2023)	510,000 (2023)	13,529
Greater Manchester	United Kingdom	194 (2025)	3,600,000 (2025)	53,889
Greater Mendoza	Argentina	18.9 (2023)	1,230,000 (2023)	15,366
Greater Metropolitan Area (Costa Rica)	Costa Rica	34.8 (2023)	2,220,000 (2023)	15,676
Greater Mexico City	Mexico	401.3 (2024)	22,280,000 (2023)	18,012
Greater Montreal	Canada	214.744 (2022)	4,378,796 (2022)	49,042
Greater Oslo Region	Norway	140 (2025)	1,500,000 (2025)	93,333
Greater Rosario	Argentina	25 (2023)	1,590,000 (2023)	15,723
Greater San Antonio	United States	210 (2025)	2,800,000 (2025)	75,000
Greater São Paulo	Brazil	319.3 (2023)	22,360,000 (2023)	14,280
Greater Stavanger	Norway	37.352 (2021)	482,645 (2021)	
Greater Sudbury	Canada	9.355 (2022)	175,357 (2022)	
Greater Temuco	Chile	4.4 (2023)	350,000 (2023)	12,571
Greater Tokyo Area	Japan	1,675 (2025)	41,200,000 (2025)	40,655
Greater Toluca	Mexico	18.9 (2023)	2,630,000 (2023)	7,186
Greater Toronto Area	Canada	481 (2025)	7,100,000 (2025)	67,746
Greater Valparaíso	Chile	17.5 (2023)	1,010,000 (2023)	17,327
Greater Vancouver	Canada	178 (2025)	3,100,000 (2025)	57,419
Greater Vitória	Brazil	19.6 (2023)	1,910,000 (2023)	10,262
Greeley, CO MSA	United States	28.181144 (2023)	359,442 (2023)	
Green Bay, WI MSA	United States	26.276686 (2023)	331,882 (2023)	
Greensboro-High Point, NC MSA	United States	52.925956 (2023)	789,842 (2023)	
Greenville, NC MSA	United States	11.865912 (2023)	175,119 (2023)	
Greenville-Anderson, SC MSA	United States	63.357431 (2023)	958,958 (2022)	
Grenoble metropolitan area	(European Union) France	53.016 (2021)	1,280,557 (2021)	
Groningen	(European Union) Netherlands	26.587 (2021)	451,098 (2021)	
Guadalajara metropolitan area	Mexico	65.8 (2023)	5,420,000 (2023)	12,140
Guatemala City	Guatemala	23.9 (2023)	3,100,000 (2023)	7,710
Guayaquil	Ecuador	23.1 (2023)	3,140,000 (2023)	7,357
Guangzhou	China	449.424 (2025)	18,902,500 (2024)	23,776
Guelph	Canada	9.897 (2022)	172,400 (2022)	
Guiyang	China	62.511 (2020)	3,300,000 (2020)	
Gujranwala	Pakistan	6.3 (2024)	2,480,000 (2024)	2,540
Gujrat, Pakistan	Pakistan	1.1 (2024)	460,000 (2024)	2,391
Gulfport-Biloxi, MS MSA	United States	24.668587 (2023)	421,916 (2023)	
Gwagwalada	Nigeria	1.9 (2023)	510,000 (2023)	3,725
Gwangju	South Korea	36.000 (2022)	1,630,000 (2022)	
Hafar al-Batin	Saudi Arabia	8.1 (2024)	380,000 (2024)	21,316
Hagerstown-Martinsburg, MD-WV MSA	United States	15.286099 (2023)	305,902 (2023)	
Haifa	Israel	62.24 (2022)	1,050,000 (2019)	
Hail (city)	Saudi Arabia	13.5 (2024)	430,000 (2024)	31,395
Haiphong	(ASEAN) Vietnam	11.9 (2023)	1,420,000 (2023)	8,380
Haixi Prefecture	China	11.906 (2024)	472,050 (2024)	
Halifax, Nova Scotia	Canada	23.284 (2022)	480,582 (2022)	
Hamadan	Iran	4.6 (2024)	610,000 (2024)	7,541
Hamamatsu	Japan	54.3 (2010)	800,866 (2010)	
Hamburg	(European Union) Germany	260 (2025)	3,500,000 (2025)	74,286
Hami	China	15.227 (2024)	668,750 (2024)	
Hammond, LA MSA	United States	6.219912 (2023)	138,064 (2023)	
Hanford-Corcoran, CA MSA	United States	8.873931 (2023)	152,682 (2023)	
Hangzhou	China	306.949 (2024)	12,573,000 (2024)	24,413
Hanoi	(ASEAN) Vietnam	37.6 (2023)	5,250,000 (2023)	7,162
Hanover–Braunschweig–Göttingen–Wolfsburg Metropolitan Region	(European Union) Germany	199.167 (2021)	3,900,000 (2021)	51,068
Harbin	China	94.1 (2017)	10,009,854 (2020)	
Harrisburg-Carlisle, PA MSA	United States	50.902418 (2023)	606,055 (2023)	
Harrisonburg, VA MSA	United States	10.348301 (2023)	137,650 (2023)	
Hartford-East Hartford-Middletown, CT (Metropolitan Statistical Area)	United States	122.805302 (2023)	1,221,725 (2022)	
Hattiesburg, MS MSA	United States	8.700243 (2023)	155,740 (2023)	
Havana	Cuba	21.4 (2023)	2,150,000 (2023)	9,953
Hefei	China	189.670 (2024)	7,800,000 (2024)	24,317
Helsinki metropolitan area	(European Union) Finland	115 (2025)	1,600,000 (2025)	71,875
Hermosillo	Mexico	17.8 (2023)	920,000 (2023)	19,348
Hickory-Lenoir-Morganton, NC MSA	United States	19.612987 (2022)	367,802 (2022)	
Hillah	Iraq	3.2 (2024)	660,000 (2024)	4,848
Hilton Head Island-Bluffton, SC MSA	United States	14.360798 (2023)	228,410 (2022)	
Hinesville, GA MSA	United States	5.154740 (2023)	88,804 (2023)	
Hiroshima	Japan	61.3 (2010)	2,860,750 (2010)	
Ho Chi Minh City	(ASEAN) Vietnam	128 (2025)	14,200,000 (2025)	9,014
Hobart	Australia	11.388 (2018–19)	218,874 (2018–19)	
Hofuf	Saudi Arabia	20.1 (2024)	880,000 (2024)	22,841
Hohhot	China	57.670 (2024)	3,621,750 (2024)	
Homosassa Springs, FL MSA	United States	6.430594 (2023)	166,696 (2023)	
Hong Kong	(Hong Kong) China	450.138 (2026)	7,548,000 (2026)	59,637
Hot Springs, AR MSA	United States	4.606197 (2023)	99,784 (2023)	
Houma-Thibodaux, LA MSA	United States	12.215010 (2023)	200,656 (2022)	
Houston-The Woodlands-Sugar Land, TX (Metropolitan Statistical Area)	United States	795 (2025)	7,900,000 (2025)	100,633
Hsinchu	Taiwan	11.980 (2016)	448,207 (2020)	
Huai'an	China	76.007 (2024)	4,538,300 (2024)	
Huancayo	Peru	2.2 (2023)	400,000 (2023)	5,500
Huế	(ASEAN) Vietnam	1.3 (2023)	430,000 (2023)	3,023
Huizhou	China	86.165 (2024)	6,095,100 (2024)	
Huntington-Ashland, WV-KY-OH MSA	United States	19.176990 (2023)	368,261 (2023)	
Huntsville, AL MSA	United States	42.815938 (2023)	527,254 (2023)	
Huzhou	China	59.163 (2024)	3,452,000 (2024)	
Hyderabad Metropolitan Region	India	144 (2026)	10,800,000 (2023)	5,620
Hyderabad, Pakistan	Pakistan	3.8 (2024)	2,010,000 (2024)	1,891
Iași	(European Union) Romania	9.928 (2021)	794,752 (2021)	
Ibadan	Nigeria	14.4 (2023)	3,870,000 (2023)	3,721
Ibagué	Colombia	3.6 (2023)	600,000 (2023)	6,000
Idaho Falls, ID MSA	United States	11.962936 (2023)	168,322 (2023)	
Ifẹ	Nigeria	1.3 (2023)	410,000 (2023)	3,171
Igbuzo	Nigeria	1.2 (2023)	490,000 (2023)	2,449
Ijebu Ode	Nigeria	1.4 (2023)	380,000 (2023)	3,684
Ikorodu	Nigeria	4.4 (2023)	1,090,000 (2023)	4,037
Ikot Ekpene	Nigeria	1.7 (2023)	430,000 (2023)	3,953
Ilesa	Nigeria	1.2 (2023)	400,000 (2023)	3,000
Iligan	(ASEAN) Philippines	1.5 (2023)	380,000 (2023)	3,947
Ilorin	Nigeria	3.9 (2023)	1,030,000 (2023)	3,786
Imus	(ASEAN) Philippines	3.4 (2023)	600,000 (2023)	5,667
Indianapolis-Carmel-Anderson, IN (Metropolitan Statistical Area)	United States	199.197977 (2023)	2,141,779 (2022)	93,006
Indore	India	9.3 (2023)	3,300,000 (2023)	2,818
Innsbruck	(European Union) Austria	17.489 (2021)	312,757 (2021)	
Iowa City, IA MSA	United States	13.602212 (2023)	180,088 (2023)	
Iquitos metropolitan area	Peru	2.5 (2023)	490,000 (2023)	5,102
Irapuato	Mexico	4.2 (2023)	480,000 (2023)	8,750
Irbid	Jordan	3.1 (2024)	560,000 (2024)	5,536
Isfahan	Iran	23.2 (2024)	2,290,000 (2024)	10,131
Islamabad	Pakistan	4.5 (2024)	1,270,000 (2024)	3,543
Ismailia	Egypt	2.3 (2024)	380,000 (2024)	6,053
Istanbul metropolitan area	Turkey	398.597 (2024)	15,900,000 (2024)	25,069
Ithaca, NY MSA	United States	7.388818 (2023)	103,558 (2023)	
İzmir	Turkey	86 (2023)	3,025,000 (2023)	
Jackson, MI MSA	United States	8.588193 (2023)	159,424 (2023)	
Jackson, MS MSA	United States	37.054502 (2023)	610,257 (2023)	
Jackson, TN MSA	United States	11.474534 (2023)	181,826 (2023)	
Jacksonville metropolitan area	United States	148 (2025)	1,800,000 (2025)	82,222
Jacksonville, NC MSA	United States	11.858614 (2023)	213,676 (2023)	
Jaipur	India	12.7 (2023)	4,210,000 (2023)	3,017
Jakarta metropolitan area	(ASEAN) Indonesia	434.389 (2024)	29,200,000 (2024)	14,876
Janesville-Beloit, WI MSA	United States	10.503232 (2023)	164,278 (2023)	
Jeddah	Saudi Arabia	111 (2024)	4,940,000 (2024)	22,470
Jefferson City, MO MSA	United States	10.722699 (2023)	150,733 (2023)	
Jerusalem	Israel	72.0 (2022)	1,181,759 (2026)	
Jhang	Pakistan	1.1 (2024)	470,000 (2024)	2,340
Jiaxing	China	106.288 (2024)	5,596,000 (2024)	
Jiayuguan	China	4.351 (2024)	315,050 (2024)	
Jinan	China	189.949 (2024)	9,475,850 (2024)	20,046
Jinchang	China	7.088 (2024)	433,500 (2024)	
Jingmen	China	27.640 (2020)	2,596,927 (2020)	
Jiujiang	China	46.981 (2020)	4,600,276 (2020)	
João Pessoa, Paraíba	Brazil	7.2 (2023)	1,170,000 (2023)	6,154
Johannesburg	South Africa	150 (2026)	10,700,000 (2026)	
Johnson City, TN MSA	United States	10.758069 (2022)	210,223 (2022)	
Johnstown, PA MSA	United States	6.068733 (2023)	130,668 (2023)	
Joinville	Brazil	11.3 (2023)	660,000 (2023)	17,121
Jonesboro, AR MSA	United States	7.875673 (2023)	136,390 (2023)	
Joplin, MO MSA	United States	9.860195 (2023)	184,086 (2022)	
Jos	Nigeria	3.1 (2023)	970,000 (2023)	3,196
Juazeiro do Norte	Brazil	2 (2023)	480,000 (2023)	4,167
Jubail	Saudi Arabia	15.6 (2024)	690,000 (2024)	22,609
Juiz de Fora	Brazil	5.3 (2023)	610,000 (2023)	8,689
Jundiaí	Brazil	19.5 (2023)	840,000 (2023)	23,214
Kabul	Afghanistan	6.000	5,050,000 (2024)	
Kaduna	Nigeria	4.8 (2023)	1,190,000 (2023)	4,034
Kafr El Dawwar	Egypt	2.3 (2024)	370,000 (2024)	6,216
Kagoshima	Japan	53.0 (2019)	1,588,256 (2020)	
Kahului-Wailuku-Lahaina, HI MSA	United States	12.299263 (2023)	164,351 (2022)	
Kalamazoo-Portage, MI MSA	United States	20.316132 (2023)	262,215 (2023)	
Kamloops	Canada	5.885 (2022)	119,408 (2022)	
Kankakee, IL MSA	United States	8.725053 (2023)	105,940 (2023)	
Kannur	India	8.2 (2023)	2,350,000 (2023)	3,489
Kanpur	India	5 (2023)	3,230,000 (2023)	1,548
Kano (city)	Nigeria	13 (2023)	4,350,000 (2023)	2,989
Kansas City, MO-KS (Metropolitan Statistical Area)	United States	185.746211 (2023)	2,221,343 (2023)	83,619
Kaohsiung	Taiwan	58.071 (2016)	2,775,000 (2020)	
Karachi	Pakistan	39.4 (2024)	17,650,000 (2024)	2,232
Karaj	Iran	11.2 (2024)	1,600,000 (2024)	7,000
Karamay	China	18.633 (2024)	490,950 (2024)	
Karbala	Iraq	2.9 (2024)	600,000 (2024)	4,833
Kashan	Iran	2.9 (2024)	350,000 (2024)	8,286
Kasur	Pakistan	1 (2024)	410,000 (2024)	2,439
Katowice-Ostrava metropolitan area (Note: Katowice-Ostrava includes Katowice metropolitan area, Ostrava metropolitan area and Bielsko-Biała metropolitan area.)	(European Union) PolandCzech Republic	88.791 (2021)	4,410,354 (2021)	
Katsina (city)	Nigeria	1.6 (2023)	520,000 (2023)	3,077
Kaunas urban area	(European Union) Lithuania	11.69021 (2021)	565,628 (2021)	
Kelowna	Canada	10.444 (2022)	235,473 (2022)	
Kenitra	Morocco	5.3 (2026)	520,000 (2024)	10,200
Kennewick-Richland, WA MSA	United States	21.082419 (2023)	314,253 (2023)	
Kerman	Iran	3.8 (2024)	550,000 (2024)	6,909
Kermanshah	Iran	8.8 (2024)	1,100,000 (2024)	8,000
Khorramabad	Iran	3.1 (2024)	420,000 (2024)	7,381
Kielce	(European Union) Poland	10.378 (2021)	708,766 (2021)	
Killeen-Temple, TX MSA	United States	26.667324 (2023)	501,333 (2023)	
Kingston upon Hull	United Kingdom	10.325 (2023)	271,942 (2023)	37,968
Kingsport-Bristol, TN-VA MSA	United States	18.326336 (2023)	313,025 (2023)	
Kingston, NY MSA	United States	9.905383 (2023)	182,333 (2023)	
Kingston, Ontario	Canada	8.252 (2022)	180,070 (2022)	
Kinshasa	Democratic Rep of Congo	67 (2026)	20,700,000	
Kirkuk	Iraq	6.2 (2024)	1,100,000 (2024)	5,636
Kitchener, Ontario	Canada	30.943 (2022)	622,497 (2022)	
Khamis Mushait	Saudi Arabia	14.8 (2024)	580,000 (2024)	25,517
Khulna	Bangladesh	2.4 (2024)	970,000 (2024)	2,474
Knoxville, TN MSA	United States	64.382649 (2023)	946,264 (2023)	
Kochi metropolitan area	India	12 (2023)	3,410,000 (2023)	3,519
Kokomo, IN MSA	United States	5.473566 (2023)	83,831 (2023)	
Kolkata metropolitan area	India	201 (2026)	15,330,000 (2023)	2,988
Kollam	India	7.3 (2023)	2,110,000 (2023)	3,460
Košice	(European Union) Slovakia	13.994 (2022)	780,288 (2022)	
Kozhikode	India	16.2 (2023)	4,090,000 (2023)	3,961
Kraków metropolitan area	(European Union) Poland	33.993 (2021)	1,533,641 (2021)	
Kumamoto	Japan	39.8 (2010)	1,817,426 (2010)	
Kunming	China	97.628 (2020)	4,250,000 (2020)	
Kut	Iraq	2.3 (2024)	510,000 (2024)	4,510
Kuwait City	Kuwait	84.8 (2024)	3,350,000 (2024)	25,313
Kyiv	Ukraine	27.5 (2020)	3,475,000 (2020)	
Kyoto–Osaka–Kobe	Japan	704.566 (2022)	17,700,000 (2022)	39,806
La Crosse-Onalaska, WI-MN MSA	United States	10.146203 (2023)	170,238 (2023)	
La Paz	Bolivia	6.2 (2023)	1,940,000 (2023)	3,196
La Plata	Argentina	12.9 (2023)	910,000 (2023)	14,176
Laayoune	Western Sahara	2.5 (2024)	270,000 (2024)	9,259
Lafayette, LA MSA	United States	27.687065 (2023)	414,288 (2023)	
Lafayette-West Lafayette, IN MSA	United States	14.979052 (2023)	226,564 (2023)	
Lafia	Nigeria	1.7 (2023)	370,000 (2023)	4,595
Lagos	Nigeria	142 (2026)	27,200,000 (2026)	5,200
Lahore	Pakistan	91 (2026)	14,410,000 (2024)	2,956
Lake Charles, LA MSA	United States	19.707364 (2022)	239,113 (2022)	
Lake Havasu City-Kingman, AZ MSA	United States	8.845478 (2023)	223,682 (2023)	
Lakeland-Winter Haven, FL MSA	United States	41.081699 (2023)	818,330 (2023)	
Lancaster, PA MSA	United States	38.970487 (2023)	558,589 (2023)	
Lansing-East Lansing, MI MSA	United States	35.439859 (2023)	473,177 (2023)	
Laredo, TX MSA	United States	16.186701 (2023)	269,148 (2023)	
Larkana	Pakistan	1.1 (2024)	590,000 (2024)	1,864
Las Cruces, NM MSA	United States	10.565364 (2023)	225,210 (2023)	
Las Palmas metropolitan area	(European Union) Spain	30.411 (2023)	1,179,391 (2026)	
Las Vegas-Henderson-Paradise, NV (Metropolitan Statistical Area)	United States	178.388313 (2023)	2,322,985 (2022)	
Launceston	Australia	3.961 (2018–19)	89,532 (2018–19)	
Lausanne metropolitan area	Switzerland	68.982 (2021)	814,762 (2021)	
Lawrence, KS MSA	United States	6.741959 (2023)	120,553 (2023)	
Lawton, OK MSA	United States	6.838293 (2023)	127,001 (2023)	
Le Mans Métropole	(European Union) France	18.444 (2021)	565,314 (2021)	
Lebanon, PA MSA	United States	7.912272 (2023)	144,252 (2023)	
Leeds (West Yorkshire)	United Kingdom	48.918 (2023)	829,413 (2023)	58,979
Leeuwarden metropolitan area	(European Union) Netherlands	13.311 (2021)	321,562 (2021)	
Leicester	United Kingdom	14.230 (2023)	379,780 (2023)	37,469
Leiden	(European Union) Netherlands	20.721 (2021)	431,595 (2021)	
León metropolitan area	Mexico	20.9 (2023)	1,900,000 (2023)	11,000
Les Abymes	(European Union) France	11.045 (2022)	407,810 (2022)	
Lethbridge	Canada	5.968 (2022)	133,064 (2022)	
Lewiston, ID-WA MSA	United States	3.915782 (2023)	65,536 (2023)	
Lewiston-Auburn, ME MSA	United States	6.750171 (2023)	113,765 (2023)	
Lexington-Fayette, KY MSA	United States	38.612656 (2023)	520,045 (2023)	
Lhasa	China	13.902 (2024)	871,800 (2024)	
Lianyungang	China	65.478 (2024)	4,587,850 (2024)	
Greater Libreville	Gabon	21.57 (2026)	2,100,000 (2026)	10,200
Liège	(European Union) Belgium	30.383 (2022)	826,237 (2022)	
Lima metropolitan area	Peru	191 (2026)	11,700,000 (2025)	12,991
Lima, OH MSA	United States	11.599931 (2023)	100,838 (2023)	
Limoges metropolitan area	(European Union) France	13.327 (2021)	370,651 (2021)	
Lincoln, NE MSA	United States	27.995268 (2023)	344,387 (2023)	
Lipa, Batangas	(ASEAN) Philippines	2.3 (2023)	420,000 (2023)	5,476
Linz	(European Union) Austria	48.98 (2021)	808,545 (2021)	
Lisbon metropolitan area	(European Union) Portugal	163.61 (2022)	3,023,627 (2025)	
Little Rock-North Little Rock-Conway, AR MSA	United States	51.199275 (2023)	764,045 (2023)	
Liuzhou	China	46.060 (2020)	2,000,000 (2020)	
Liverpool (Merseyside)	United Kingdom	61.200 (2023)	1,586,149 (2023)	38,584
Ljubljana	(European Union) Slovenia	23.092 (2022)	555,213 (2022)	
Łódź metropolitan area	(European Union) Poland	21.78 (2021)	1,054,668 (2021)	
Logan, UT-ID MSA	United States	8.907030 (2023)	157,887 (2023)	
Lokoja	Nigeria	2.9 (2023)	840,000 (2023)	3,452
London metropolitan area	United Kingdom	1,200 (2025)	12,700,000 (2025)	94,488
London, Ontario	Canada	25.101 (2022)	574,238 (2022)	
Londrina	Brazil	7.5 (2023)	770,000 (2023)	9,740
Long Xuyên (city)	(ASEAN) Vietnam	1 (2023)	340,000 (2023)	2,941
Longview, TX MSA	United States	20.024488 (2023)	293,498 (2023)	
Longview, WA MSA	United States	7.096628 (2023)	111,956 (2022)	
Longyan	China	48.004 (2024)	2,690,500 (2024)	
Los Angeles-Long Beach-Anaheim, CA (Metropolitan Statistical Area)	United States	1,400 (2025)	12,900,000 (2025)	108,527
Los Mochis	Mexico	3.9 (2023)	330,000 (2023)	11,818
Louisville/Jefferson County, KY-IN (Metropolitan Statistical Area)	United States	97.751023 (2023)	1,365,557 (2023)	
Luanda	Angola	92 (2026)	10,600,000 (2025)	4,906
Lubbock, TX MSA	United States	19.655310 (2023)	360,104 (2023)	
Lublin	(European Union) Poland	11.549 (2021)	687,985 (2021)	
Lucerne	Switzerland	36.359 (2021)	459,867 (2021)	
Lucknow	India	6.8 (2023)	3,950,000 (2023)	1,722
Luton	United Kingdom	9.522 (2023)	231,028 (2023)	41,216
Luoyang	China	74.352 (2020)	2,550,000 (2020)	
Luxembourg	(European Union) Luxembourg	110.417 (2026)	696,000 (2026)	158,645
Lynchburg, VA MSA	United States	13.511861 (2023)	264,590 (2023)	
Maanshan	China	39.101 (2024)	2,196,000 (2024)	
Macao	(Macau) China	54.228 (2026)	709,000 (2026)	
Macapá	Brazil	3.5 (2023)	670,000 (2023)	5,224
Maceió	Brazil	7.1 (2023)	1,240,000 (2023)	5,726
Mackay	Australia	6.540 (2018–19)	80,148 (2018)	
Macon-Bibb County, GA MSA	United States	13.337109 (2023)	236,074 (2023)	
Madera, CA MSA	United States	8.025001 (2023)	160,256 (2022)	
Madison, WI MSA	United States	66.115608 (2023)	694,345 (2023)	
Madrid Metropolitan Area	(European Union) Spain	385 (2025)	7,400,000 (2025)	52,027
Maiduguri	Nigeria	3 (2023)	840,000 (2023)	3,571
Makassar Metropolitan	(ASEAN) Indonesia	17.052 (2021)	1,920,000 (2021)	
Makurdi	Nigeria	1.5 (2023)	450,000 (2023)	3,333
Málaga metropolitan area	(European Union) Spain	44.587 (2023)	1,805,105 (2026)	
Malappuram	India	14.2 (2023)	4,010,000 (2023)	3,541
Malmö	(European Union) Sweden	73.741 (2021)	1,389,336 (2021)	
Manado Metropolitan	(ASEAN) Indonesia	5.487 (2021)	1,008,126 (2021)	
Managua	Nicaragua	3.6 (2023)	1,090,000 (2023)	3,303
Manama	Bahrain	19.7 (2024)	730,000 (2024)	26,986
Manaus	Brazil	22.5 (2023)	2,280,000 (2023)	9,868
Manchester-Nashua, NH MSA	United States	36.596890 (2023)	427,354 (2023)	
Manhattan, KS MSA	United States	8.802533 (2023)	132,831 (2023)	
Mangaluru	India	9.49 (2022)	623,841 (2011)	
Manizales	Colombia	2.9 (2023)	460,000 (2023)	6,304
Mankato, MN MSA	United States	7.182368 (2023)	104,248 (2023)	
Mar del Plata	Argentina	8.3 (2023)	690,000 (2023)	12,029
Mardan	Pakistan	0.9 (2024)	410,000 (2024)	2,195
Maribor	(European Union) Slovenia	7.613 (2022)	327,998 (2022)	
Maringá	Brazil	6.4 (2023)	680,000 (2023)	9,412
Mansfield, OH MSA	United States	5.920097 (2023)	125,064 (2023)	
Mansoura, Egypt	Egypt	3.8 (2024)	600,000 (2024)	6,333
Marrakesh	Morocco	17.8 (2026)	1,090,000 (2026)	16,300
Mashhad	Iran	24.9 (2024)	3,420,000 (2024)	7,281
Matamoros, Tamaulipas	Mexico	4.9 (2023)	590,000 (2023)	8,305
Mataram Metropolitan	(ASEAN) Indonesia	5.491 (2021)	3,808,908 (2021)	
Mazatlán	Mexico	4.9 (2023)	480,000 (2023)	10,208
McAllen-Edinburg-Mission, TX MSA	United States	30.225234 (2023)	898,471 (2023)	
Mecca	Saudi Arabia	39.8 (2024)	2,180,000 (2024)	18,257
Medan Metropolitan	(ASEAN) Indonesia	28.248 (2021)	4,075,000 (2021)	
Medford, OR MSA	United States	12.853288 (2023)	220,768 (2023)	
Medina	Saudi Arabia	36.6 (2024)	1,600,000 (2024)	22,875
Meknes	Morocco	3.9 (2026)	590,000 (2024)	4,068
Melbourne	Australia	339 (2025)	5,400,000 (2025)	62,778
Memphis, TN-MS-AR (Metropolitan Statistical Area)	United States	102.934012 (2023)	1,335,674 (2023)	
Merced, CA MSA	United States	12.214481 (2023)	291,920 (2023)	
Mérida, Yucatán	Mexico	13.9 (2023)	1,220,000 (2023)	11,393
Metro Bacolod	(ASEAN) Philippines	3 (2023)	650,000 (2023)	4,615
Metro Baguio	(ASEAN) Philippines	2.1 (2023)	390,000 (2023)	5,385
Metro Cagayan de Oro	(ASEAN) Philippines	3.7 (2023)	800,000 (2023)	4,625
Metro Cebu	(ASEAN) Philippines	9.2 (2023)	1,950,000 (2023)	4,718
Metro Clark	(ASEAN) Philippines	5.6 (2023)	910,000 (2023)	6,154
Metro Davao	(ASEAN) Philippines	7.2 (2023)	1,950,000 (2023)	3,692
Metro Iloilo–Guimaras	(ASEAN) Philippines	2 (2023)	490,000 (2023)	4,082
Metro Manila	(ASEAN) Philippines	80 (2023)	14,670,000 (2023)	5,453
Métropole du Grand Nancy	(European Union) France	24.649 (2021)	732,085 (2021)	
Métropole Nice Côte d'Azur	(European Union) France	32 (2026)	1,101,039 (2021)	
Métropole Rouen Normandie	(European Union) France	50.939 (2021)	1,254,203 (2021)	
Metropolis of Lyon	(European Union) France	134 (2026)	1,899,599 (2021)	60,583
Metropolitan area of Barranquilla	Colombia	14.4 (2023)	2,370,000 (2023)	6,076
Metropolitan Area of Cúcuta	Colombia	3.6 (2023)	970,000 (2023)	3,711
Metropolitan area of Puebla	Mexico	28.6 (2023)	3,340,000 (2023)	8,563
Metropolitan Area of the Aburrá Valley	Colombia	50 (2025)	4,000,000 (2025)	12,500
Metropolitan City of Bari	(European Union) Italy	33.945 (2021)	1,230,819 (2021)	
Metropolitan City of Cagliari	(European Union) Italy	14.262 (2021)	421,488 (2021)	
Metropolitan City of Catania	(European Union) Italy	24.86 (2021)	1,074,089 (2021)	
Metropolitan City of Florence	(European Union) Italy	45.934 (2021)	998,431 (2021)	
Metropolitan City of Genoa	(European Union) Italy	34.345 (2021)	823,612 (2021)	
Metropolitan City of Messina	(European Union) Italy	13.702 (2021)	603,980 (2021)	
Metropolitan City of Palermo	(European Union) Italy	28.834 (2021)	1,208,819 (2021)	
Metropolitan City of Venice	(European Union) Italy	31.306 (2021)	843,545 (2021)	
Metropolitan Cork	(European Union) Ireland	136.816 (2021)	719,187 (2021)	
Metropolitan Region Amsterdam	(European Union) Netherlands	286 (2025)	3,000,000 (2025)	95,333
Metropolitan Stockholm	(European Union) Sweden	221 (2025)	2,500,000 (2025)	88,400
Mexicali	Mexico	13.3 (2023)	1,180,000 (2023)	11,271
Miami-Fort Lauderdale-West Palm Beach, FL (Metropolitan Statistical Area)	United States	533.674 (2024)	6,457,988 (2024)	82,638
Michigan City-La Porte, IN MSA	United States	5.676096 (2023)	111,706 (2023)	
Midland, MI MSA	United States	7.636137 (2023)	84,039 (2023)	
Midland, TX MSA	United States	53.664570 (2023)	182,324 (2023)	
Milan metropolitan area	(European Union) Italy	270.171 (2021)	4,339,269 (2021)	62,262
Milton Keynes	United Kingdom	22.240 (2023)	298,270 (2023)	74,563
Milwaukee-Waukesha-West Allis, WI (Metropolitan Statistical Area)	United States	130.856689 (2023)	1,560,424 (2023)	
Minatitlán, Veracruz	Mexico	3.5 (2023)	420,000 (2023)	8,333
Minna	Nigeria	1.9 (2023)	500,000 (2023)	3,800
Minneapolis-St. Paul-Bloomington, MN-WI (Metropolitan Statistical Area)	United States	388 (2025)	3,800,000 (2025)	102,105
Minsk	Belarus	19.913 (2023)	2,050,000 (2023)	
Miskolc metropolitan area	(European Union) Hungary	7.787 (2022)	626,477 (2022)	
Missoula, MT MSA	United States	8.201713 (2023)	126,939 (2023)	
Mobile, AL MSA	United States	29.553574 (2023)	411,640 (2023)	
Modesto, CA MSA	United States	30.597632 (2023)	551,430 (2023)	
Monaco	Monaco	6.816 (2020)	39,150 (2021)	
Monclova	Mexico	5.3 (2023)	380,000 (2023)	13,947
Moncton	Canada	7.467 (2022)	171,608 (2022)	
Monroe, LA MSA	United States	10.276428 (2023)	221,885 (2023)	
Monroe, MI MSA	United States	7.956412 (2023)	155,045 (2023)	
Montería	Colombia	1.6 (2023)	450,000 (2023)	3,556
Monterrey metropolitan area	Mexico	131 (2025)	5,500,000 (2025)	23,818
Montes Claros	Brazil	2.4 (2023)	420,000 (2023)	5,714
Montevideo	Uruguay	33.3 (2023)	1,770,000 (2023)	18,814
Montgomery, AL MSA	United States	24.065840 (2023)	385,480 (2023)	
Montpellier Méditerranée Métropole	(European Union) France	45.4 (2021)	1,203,899 (2021)	
Morelia	Mexico	9.7 (2023)	990,000 (2023)	9,798
Morgantown, WV MSA	United States	10.070965 (2023)	141,817 (2023)	
Morristown, TN MSA	United States	7.387094 (2023)	124,054 (2023)	
Moscow metropolitan area	Russia	504.808 (2022)	17,400,000 (2022)	29,012
Mosul	Iraq	10.6 (2024)	1,850,000 (2024)	5,730
Mount Vernon-Anacortes, WA MSA	United States	8.858346 (2023)	131,417 (2023)	
Mulhouse Alsace Agglomération	(European Union) France	27.137 (2021)	767,736 (2021)	
Multan	Pakistan	5.6 (2024)	2,210,000 (2024)	2,534
Mumbai Metropolitan Region	India	436 (2026)	26,200,000 (2026)	16,600
Muncie, IN MSA	United States	5.333469 (2023)	112,321 (2023)	
Munich	(European Union) Germany	305 (2025)	3,000,000 (2025)	101,667
Murcia metropolitan area	(European Union) Spain	45.988 (2024)	1,604,043 (2026)	
Muscat	Oman	36.6 (2024)	1,680,000 (2024)	21,786
Muskegon, MI MSA	United States	8.004713 (2023)	176,565 (2022)	
Mymensingh	Bangladesh	1.2 (2024)	500,000 (2024)	2,400
Myrtle Beach-Conway-North Myrtle Beach, SC-NC MSA	United States	27.945154 (2023)	536,165 (2022)	
Nagoya	Japan	454.904 (2022)	10,500,000 (2022)	43,324
Nagpur metropolitan area	India	12.9 (2023)	3,050,000 (2023)	4,230
Nairobi	Kenya	75 (2026)	6,800,000 (2025)	6,176
Najaf	Iraq	3.7 (2024)	990,000 (2024)	3,737
Najran	Saudi Arabia	10.7 (2024)	440,000 (2024)	24,318
Namur metropolitan area	(European Union) Belgium	11.973 (2022)	321,698 (2022)	
Nanaimo	Canada	4.89 (2022)	120,165 (2022)	
Nanchang	China	109.530 (2024)	6,619,300 (2024)	
Nanjing	China	259.781 (2024)	9,562,000 (2024)	27,168
Nanning	China	54.299 (2015)	7,765,411 (2015)	
Nanping	China	29.104 (2020)	2,680,645 (2020)	
Nantes	(European Union) France	64.853 (2021)	1,461,267 (2021)	
Nantong	China	174.423 (2024)	7,749,250 (2024)	
Napa, CA MSA	United States	14.227116 (2023)	133,216 (2023)	
Naples metropolitan area	(European Union) Italy	72.215 (2021)	2,986,745 (2021)	
Naples-Marco Island, FL MSA	United States	31.526854 (2023)	404,310 (2023)	
Nashik Metropolitan Region	India	9.4 (2023)	2,240,000 (2023)	4,196
Nashville-Davidson—Murfreesboro—Franklin, TN (Metropolitan Statistical Area)	United States	223.009 (2024)	2,162,758 (2024)	103,113
Nasiriyah	Iraq	4.1 (2024)	690,000 (2024)	5,942
Natal	Brazil	8.6 (2023)	1,400,000 (2023)	6,143
National Capital Region (India)	India	403 (2026)	32,940,000 (2023)	5,580
Neiva, Huila	Colombia	2.2 (2023)	370,000 (2023)	5,946
Neuquén	Argentina	6.6 (2023)	430,000 (2023)	15,349
New Bern, NC MSA	United States	7.196683 (2023)	122,488 (2022)	
New Haven-Milford, CT MSA	United States	65.232142 (2023)	869,527 (2022)	
New Orleans-Metairie, LA (Metropolitan Statistical Area)	United States	102.436589 (2023)	962,165 (2023)	
New York-Newark-Jersey City, NY-NJ-PA (Metropolitan Statistical Area)	United States	2,600 (2025)	20,100,000 (2025)	129,353
Newcastle	Australia	11.554 (2018–19)	492,805 (2018–19)	
Nha Trang	(ASEAN) Vietnam	1.4 (2023)	340,000 (2023)	4,118
Nicosia	(European Union) Cyprus	29.251 (2022)	904,705 (2022)	
Niigata	Japan	43.3 (2010)	2,374,450 (2010)	
Niles, MI MSA	United States	9.484269 (2023)	152,261 (2023)	
Ningbo	China	254.823 (2024)	9,737,000 (2024)	26,171
Ningde	China	54.790 (2024)	3,162,000 (2024)	
Nnewi	Nigeria	6.3 (2023)	1,240,000 (2023)	5,081
North Port-Sarasota-Bradenton, FL MSA	United States	56.607597 (2023)	891,411 (2022)	
Northwest Metropolitan Region	(European Union) Germany	123.046 (2022)	2,800,000 (2023)	43,945
Norwich-New London, CT MSA	United States	23.909840 (2023)	268,681 (2022)	
Nottingham	United Kingdom	17.547 (2023)	329,276 (2023)	53,290
Nuevo Laredo	Mexico	5.5 (2023)	470,000 (2023)	11,702
Nuremberg Metropolitan Region	(European Union) Germany	175.859 (2022)	3,611,000 (2022)	48,701
Nyingchi	China	2.774 (2020)	238,936 (2020)	
Oaxaca City	Mexico	6.2 (2023)	740,000 (2023)	8,378
Ocala, FL MSA	United States	15.982712 (2023)	409,959 (2023)	
Ocean City, NJ MSA	United States	7.772540 (2023)	95,634 (2022)	
Odense	(European Union) Denmark	24.15 (2022)	501,782 (2022)	
Odessa, TX MSA	United States	15.658079 (2023)	164,494 (2023)	
Ogden-Clearfield, UT MSA	United States	43.646961 (2023)	713,839 (2022)	
Ogbomosho	Nigeria	2 (2023)	630,000 (2023)	3,175
Okara, Pakistan	Pakistan	1 (2024)	440,000 (2024)	2,273
Okayama	Japan	63.1 (2010)	1,945,276 (2010)	
Okene	Nigeria	1.6 (2023)	510,000 (2023)	3,137
Oklahoma City, OK (Metropolitan Statistical Area)	United States	100.054101 (2023)	1,477,926 (2023)	
Okpogho	Nigeria	2 (2023)	510,000 (2023)	3,922
Olsztyn metropolitan area	(European Union) Poland	8.47 (2021)	573,199 (2021)	
Olympia-Lacey-Tumwater, WA MSA	United States	19.969972 (2023)	299,003 (2023)	
Omaha-Council Bluffs, NE-IA MSA	United States	92.356612 (2023)	976,671 (2022)	
Ondo City	Nigeria	1.7 (2023)	480,000 (2023)	3,542
Onitsha	Nigeria	9.2 (2023)	1,620,000 (2023)	5,679
Opole	(European Union) Poland	10.023 (2021)	567,836 (2021)	
Oran	Algeria	5.5 (2024)	950,000 (2024)	5,789
Orange	Australia	3.204 (2018–19)	40,493 (2018)	
Ordos	China	89.347 (2024)	2,230,400 (2024)	
Orizaba	Mexico	4.5 (2023)	490,000 (2023)	9,184
Orlando-Kissimmee-Sanford, FL (Metropolitan Statistical Area)	United States	233.182 (2024)	2,919,982 (2024)	79,857
Orléans	(European Union) France	27.275 (2021)	684,609 (2021)	
Oruro	Bolivia	1.1 (2023)	340,000 (2023)	3,235
Oshawa	Canada	12.576 (2022)	447,079 (2022)	
Oshkosh-Neenah, WI MSA	United States	13.408456 (2023)	171,735 (2023)	
Osogbo	Nigeria	2.7 (2023)	770,000 (2023)	3,506
Oujda	Morocco	3.4 (2024)	610,000 (2024)	5,574
Ottawa–Gatineau	Canada	81.306 (2022)	1,498,610 (2022)	
Owensboro, KY MSA	United States	7.142735 (2023)	112,512 (2023)	
Owerri	Nigeria	6.2 (2023)	980,000 (2023)	6,327
Oxnard-Thousand Oaks-Ventura, CA MSA	United States	65.991334 (2023)	829,590 (2023)	
Oyo, Oyo State	Nigeria	1.5 (2023)	470,000 (2023)	3,191
Pachuca metropolitan area	Mexico	6.7 (2023)	670,000 (2023)	10,000
Padang Metropolitan	(ASEAN) Indonesia	6.213 (2021)	1,441,760 (2021)	
Padua metropolitan area	(European Union) Italy	39.575 (2021)	932,629 (2021)	
Palembang Metropolitan	(ASEAN) Indonesia	16.561 (2021)	1,740,000 (2021)	
Palm Bay-Melbourne-Titusville, FL MSA	United States	39.591386 (2023)	643,979 (2023)	
Palma de Mallorca metropolitan area	(European Union) Spain	48.375 (2024)	1,259,545 (2026)	
Pamplona metropolitan area	(European Union) Spain	28.812 (2024)	689,018 (2026)	
Panama City	Panama	38.4 (2023)	1,980,000 (2023)	19,394
Panama City, FL MSA	United States	12.731669 (2023)	185,134 (2022)	
Panjin	China	19.848 (2024)	1,379,460 (2024)	
Panzhihua	China	19.591 (2024)	1,220,500 (2024)	
Paris metropolitan area	(European Union) France	1,000 (2025)	13,400,000 (2025)	74,627
Parkersburg-Vienna, WV MSA	United States	4.711556 (2023)	88,052 (2023)	
Parma	(European Union) Italy	22.51 (2021)	449,628 (2021)	
Pasto, Colombia	Colombia	2.1 (2023)	400,000 (2023)	5,250
Patna	India	3.2 (2023)	2,580,000 (2023)	1,240
Pécs	(European Union) Hungary	4.561 (2022)	354,341 (2022)	
Pekanbaru Metropolitan	(ASEAN) Indonesia	25.279 (2021)	1,250,000 (2021)	
Pelotas	Brazil	2.6 (2023)	380,000 (2023)	6,842
Pensacola-Ferry Pass-Brent, FL MSA	United States	29.977030 (2023)	530,090 (2023)	
Peoria, IL MSA	United States	27.879142 (2023)	362,240 (2023)	
Pereira, Colombia	Colombia	3.8 (2023)	590,000 (2023)	6,441
Perpignan Méditerranée Métropole	(European Union) France	14.49 (2021)	483,558 (2021)	
Perth	Australia	239 (2025)	2,500,000 (2025)	95,600
Perugia metropolitan area	(European Union) Italy	20.729 (2021)	645,506 (2021)	
Peshawar	Pakistan	6.4 (2024)	2,480,000 (2024)	2,581
Peterborough	United Kingdom	10.905 (2023)	219,509 (2023)	49,679
Peterborough, Ontario	Canada	4.601 (2022)	135,005 (2022)	
Petrolina	Brazil	3.1 (2023)	580,000 (2023)	5,345
Philadelphia-Camden-Wilmington, PA-NJ-DE-MD (Metropolitan Statistical Area)	United States	557.601 (2024)	6,330,422 (2024)	88,083
Phoenix-Mesa-Scottsdale, AZ (Metropolitan Statistical Area)	United States	459 (2025)	5,200,000 (2025)	88,269
Pine Bluff, AR MSA	United States	4.146574 (2023)	84,629 (2022)	
Piracicaba	Brazil	7.9 (2023)	480,000 (2023)	16,458
Pittsburgh, PA (Metropolitan Statistical Area)	United States	194.229253 (2023)	2,422,725 (2023)	80,170
Pittsfield, MA MSA	United States	8.955924 (2023)	126,818 (2023)	
Piura metropolitan area	Peru	3.4 (2023)	500,000 (2023)	6,800
Ploiești	(European Union) Romania	10.458 (2021)	703,368 (2021)	
Plovdiv	(European Union) Bulgaria	6.266 (2021)	666,398 (2021)	
Plymouth	United Kingdom	10.178 (2023)	268,736 (2023)	37,874
Plzeň	(European Union) Czech Republic	14.003 (2022)	578,707 (2022)	
Pocatello, ID MSA	United States	4.569769 (2023)	90,400 (2023)	
Ponta Grossa	Brazil	4.4 (2023)	390,000 (2023)	11,282
Port Harcourt	Nigeria	25 (2026)	3,480,000 (2023)	4,885
Port Said	Egypt	4 (2024)	790,000 (2024)	5,063
Port St. Lucie, FL MSA	United States	27.153067 (2023)	536,901 (2023)	
Portland-South Portland, ME MSA	United States	48.037136 (2023)	566,329 (2023)	
Portland-Vancouver-Hillsboro, OR-WA (Metropolitan Statistical Area)	United States	225.338 (2024)	2,531,245 (2024)	89,023
Porto Alegre	Brazil	46.7 (2023)	4,080,000 (2023)	11,446
Porto metropolitan area	(European Union) Portugal	41.257 (2022)	1,740,117 (2022)	
Porto Velho	Brazil	4.8 (2023)	580,000 (2023)	8,276
Portsmouth-Southampton Metropolitan area	United Kingdom	24.375 (2023)	466,407 (2023)	52,261
Posadas, Misiones	Argentina	5.9 (2023)	410,000 (2023)	14,390
Potiskum	Nigeria	1 (2023)	510,000 (2023)	1,961
Poza Rica	Mexico	4.7 (2023)	580,000 (2023)	8,103
Poznań metropolitan area	(European Union) Poland	33.828 (2021)	1,241,984 (2021)	
Prague metropolitan area	(European Union) Czech Republic	115.803 (2022)	2,662,230 (2022)	
Prato	(European Union) Italy	9.743 (2021)	265,269 (2021)	
Prescott Valley–Prescott, AZ MSA	United States	6.111 (2017)	228,398 (2017)	
Pretoria	South Africa	43 (2026)	7,426,673 (2022)	
Providence-Warwick, RI-MA (Metropolitan Statistical Area)	United States	111.839552 (2023)	1,677,803 (2023)	
Provo-Orem, UT MSA	United States	45.033143 (2023)	715,001 (2022)	
Pueblo, CO MSA	United States	8.576776 (2023)	169,422 (2023)	
Puerto Vallarta	Mexico	8.4 (2023)	560,000 (2023)	15,000
Pune Metropolitan Region	India	31.3 (2023)	7,170,000 (2023)	4,365
Punta Gorda, FL MSA	United States	8.701074 (2023)	206,134 (2023)	
Putian	China	48.342 (2024)	3,185,500 (2024)	
Qazvin	Iran	3.5 (2024)	440,000 (2024)	7,955
Qingdao	China	234.768 (2024)	10,407,000 (2024)	22,559
Qods, Iran	Iran	1.9 (2024)	350,000 (2024)	5,429
Qom	Iran	8.8 (2024)	1,370,000 (2024)	6,423
Quanzhou	China	183.873 (2024)	8,898,500 (2024)	20,663
Quebec City	Canada	45.363 (2022)	848,776 (2022)	
Querétaro metropolitan area	Mexico	20.5 (2023)	1,410,000 (2023)	14,539
Quetta	Pakistan	3.2 (2024)	1,220,000 (2024)	2,623
Quito	Ecuador	18.3 (2023)	1,960,000 (2023)	9,337
Quzhou	China	31.774 (2024)	2,298,000 (2024)	
Rabat	Morocco	10.4 (2024)	1,990,000 (2024)	5,226
Racine, WI MSA	United States	10.914885 (2023)	195,846 (2022)	
Radom County	(European Union) Poland	7.487 (2021)	574,281 (2021)	
Rahim Yar Khan	Pakistan	1.3 (2024)	520,000 (2024)	2,500
Rajkot	India	9.8 (2023)	2,040,000 (2023)	4,804
Rajshahi	Bangladesh	2.5 (2024)	980,000 (2024)	2,551
Raleigh, NC (Metropolitan Statistical Area)	United States	133.081325 (2023)	1,509,231 (2023)	
Ramadi	Iraq	2.5 (2024)	490,000 (2024)	5,102
Rangpur, Bangladesh	Bangladesh	0.9 (2024)	450,000 (2024)	2,000
Rapid City, SD MSA	United States	9.425612 (2023)	155,974 (2023)	
Rasht	Iran	5.1 (2024)	750,000 (2024)	6,800
Rawalpindi	Pakistan	6.2 (2024)	2,430,000 (2024)	2,551
Reading, PA MSA	United States	25.974930 (2023)	432,821 (2023)	
Recife	Brazil	28.4 (2023)	4,160,000 (2023)	6,827
Red Deer, Alberta	Canada	4.727 (2022)	107,073 (2022)	
Redding, CA MSA	United States	11.047068 (2023)	180,366 (2023)	
Reggio Emilia metropolitan area	(European Union) Italy	24.022 (2021)	527,140 (2021)	
Regina, Saskatchewan	Canada	17.596 (2022)	268,804 (2022)	
Rennes Métropole	(European Union) France	47.189 (2021)	1,098,420 (2021)	
Reno, NV MSA	United States	43.148385 (2023)	564,782 (2023)	
Resistencia, Chaco	Argentina	7.4 (2023)	450,000 (2023)	16,444
Reynosa	Mexico	12.5 (2023)	950,000 (2023)	13,158
Rhine-Neckar	(European Union) Germany	117.201 (2022)	2,458,595 (2023)	47,670
Rhine-Ruhr metropolitan region	(European Union) Germany	634.436 (2021)	11,300,000 (2021)	56,145
Ribeirão Preto	Brazil	10.1 (2023)	910,000 (2023)	11,099
Richmond, VA (Metropolitan Statistical Area)	United States	116.959541 (2023)	1,349,732 (2023)	
Riga metropolitan area	(European Union) Latvia	27.156 (2021)	993,600 (2021)	
Rio Branco, Acre	Brazil	2.3 (2023)	430,000 (2023)	5,349
Rio de Janeiro metropolitan area	Brazil	171.8 (2023)	13,280,000 (2023)	12,937
Riverside-San Bernardino-Ontario, CA (Metropolitan Statistical Area)	United States	272.67 (2024)	4,747,876 (2024)	57,430
Riyadh	Saudi Arabia	328 (2026)	8,600,000 (2025)	50,930
Roanoke, VA MSA	United States	21.742564 (2023)	314,314 (2023)	
Rochester, MN MSA	United States	17.948981 (2023)	229,077 (2023)	
Rochester, NY MSA	United States	78.469076 (2023)	1,052,087 (2023)	
Rockford, IL MSA	United States	19.712066 (2023)	334,124 (2023)	
Rockhampton	Australia	5.342 (2018–19)	78,592 (2018)	
Rocky Mount, NC MSA	United States	8.732690 (2023)	145,383 (2023)	
Rome metropolitan area	(European Union) Italy	240.731 (2023)	4,231,451 (2021)	56,891
Rome, GA MSA	United States	5.449843 (2023)	100,113 (2023)	
Rotterdam	(European Union) Netherlands	112.578 (2021)	1,834,417 (2021)	
Ruhr	(European Union) Germany	192.211 (2020)	5,162,812 (2023)	37,230
Russeifa	Jordan	2.4 (2024)	530,000 (2024)	4,528
Rustenburg	South Africa	8.3 (2026)	622,000 (2026)	13,300
Rzeszów	(European Union) Poland	9.797 (2021)	615,954 (2021)	
Sacramento—Roseville—Arden-Arcade, CA (Metropolitan Statistical Area)	United States	189.624282 (2023)	2,420,608 (2023)	78,337
Safi, Morocco	Morocco	1.3 (2024)	340,000 (2024)	3,824
Saginaw, MI MSA	United States	10.801688 (2023)	187,782 (2023)	
Saguenay, Quebec	Canada	8.746 (2022)	165,185 (2022)	
Sahiwal	Pakistan	1.2 (2024)	480,000 (2024)	2,500
Saint John, New Brunswick	Canada	6.017 (2022)	135,622 (2022)	
Saint Petersburg	Russia	128.000 (2021)	5,650,000 (2021)	
Saint-Étienne Métropole	(European Union) France	26.794 (2021)	766,473 (2021)	
Salalah	Oman	7.9 (2024)	450,000 (2024)	17,556
Salem, OR MSA	United States	25.733543 (2023)	436,546 (2023)	
Salinas, CA MSA	United States	36.861463 (2023)	430,723 (2023)	
Salisbury, MD-DE MSA	United States	30.830418 (2023)	439,032 (2022)	
Salt Lake City, UT (Metropolitan Statistical Area)	United States	147.519150 (2023)	1,266,191 (2022)	
Salta	Argentina	8.7 (2023)	720,000 (2023)	12,083
Saltillo	Mexico	15.6 (2023)	1,030,000 (2023)	15,146
Salvador	Brazil	29.5 (2023)	3,860,000 (2023)	7,642
Salzburg	(European Union) Austria	26.129 (2021)	371,032 (2021)	
Samarra	Iraq	1.9 (2024)	340,000 (2024)	5,588
San Angelo, TX MSA	United States	9.613209 (2023)	120,606 (2023)	
San Diego-Carlsbad, CA (Metropolitan Statistical Area)	United States	346 (2025)	3,300,000 (2025)	104,848
San Francisco–Oakland–Fremont, CA MSA	United States	842 (2025)	4,600,000 (2025)	183,043
San Juan	Puerto Rico	45.461 (2021)	1,920,000 (2021)	
San Juan, Argentina	Argentina	7.3 (2023)	550,000 (2023)	13,273
San Jose del Monte	(ASEAN) Philippines	4.5 (2023)	630,000 (2023)	7,143
San Jose–Sunnyvale–Santa Clara, CA MSA	United States	474 (2025)	2,000,000 (2025)	237,000
San Luis Potosí (city)	Mexico	19 (2023)	1,270,000 (2023)	14,961
San Luis Obispo-Paso Robles, CA MSA	United States	22.753294 (2023)	281,639 (2023)	
San Marino	San Marino	2.417 (2026)	34,000 (2026)	
San Miguel de Tucumán	Argentina	13.4 (2023)	1,030,000 (2023)	13,010
San Pedro Sula	Honduras	4.2 (2023)	980,000 (2023)	4,286
San Pedro, Laguna	(ASEAN) Philippines	2.1 (2023)	380,000 (2023)	5,526
San Salvador	El Salvador	7.3 (2023)	1,120,000 (2023)	6,518
San Salvador de Jujuy	Argentina	4.5 (2023)	380,000 (2023)	11,842
Sanandaj	Iran	4.1 (2024)	480,000 (2024)	8,542
Sanmenxia	China	21.033 (2020)	2,034,872 (2020)	
Sanming	China	41.043 (2024)	2,424,000 (2024)	
Santa Cruz de la Sierra	Bolivia	9.9 (2023)	1,820,000 (2023)	5,440
Santa Cruz de Tenerife metropolitan area	(European Union) Spain	27.968 (2023)	1,093,343 (2026)	
Santa Cruz-Watsonville, CA MSA	United States	20.186709 (2023)	261,547 (2023)	
Santa Fe, Argentina	Argentina	7.6 (2023)	580,000 (2023)	13,103
Santa Fe, NM MSA	United States	9.278913 (2023)	155,956 (2023)	
Santa Maria-Santa Barbara, CA MSA	United States	38.512465 (2023)	441,257 (2023)	
Santa Marta	Colombia	2.2 (2023)	550,000 (2023)	4,000
Santa Rosa-Petaluma, CA MSA	United States	38.453328 (2023)	481,812 (2023)	
Santa Rosa, Laguna	(ASEAN) Philippines	2.7 (2023)	480,000 (2023)	5,625
Santander metropolitan area	(European Union) Spain	19.158 (2024)	597,281 (2026)	
Santiago de Cuba	Cuba	3.2 (2023)	440,000 (2023)	7,273
Santiago de los Caballeros	Dominican Republic	8.1 (2023)	690,000 (2023)	11,739
Santiago del Estero	Argentina	6.1 (2023)	450,000 (2023)	13,556
Santiago Metropolitan Region	Chile	146 (2025)	8,300,000 (2025)	17,590
Santo Domingo	Dominican Republic	37.5 (2023)	3,520,000 (2023)	10,653
Santo Domingo, Ecuador	Ecuador	2.3 (2023)	380,000 (2023)	6,053
Santos	Brazil	16.1 (2023)	1,790,000 (2023)	8,994
São José do Rio Preto	Brazil	6.2 (2023)	640,000 (2023)	9,688
São José dos Campos	Brazil	18 (2023)	1,340,000 (2023)	13,433
São Luís	Brazil	8.7 (2023)	1,470,000 (2023)	5,918
Sapporo	Japan	84.7 (2010)	1,913,545 (2010)	
Sargodha	Pakistan	1.9 (2024)	760,000 (2024)	2,500
Sari, Iran	Iran	2.8 (2024)	330,000 (2024)	8,485
Saskatoon	Canada	20.373 (2022)	347,536 (2022)	
Savannah, GA MSA	United States	32.395522 (2023)	424,935 (2023)	
Scranton–Wilkes-Barre, PA MSA	United States	34.511287 (2023)	569,413 (2023)	
Seattle-Tacoma-Bellevue, WA (Metropolitan Statistical Area)	United States	632 (2025)	4,200,000 (2025)	150,476
Sebastian-Vero Beach, FL MSA	United States	10.207144 (2023)	167,352 (2022)	
Sebring-Avon Park, FL MSA	United States	3.583095 (2023)	105,618 (2022)	
Semarang Metropolitan	(ASEAN) Indonesia	26.057 (2021)	2,275,000 (2021)	
Sendai	Japan	50 (2015)	1,082,159 (2015)	
Seoul metropolitan area	South Korea	970 (2025)	24,500,000 (2025)	39,592
Sétif	Algeria	2.1 (2024)	340,000 (2024)	6,176
Seville metropolitan area	(European Union) Spain	52.817 (2023)	1,994,601 (2026)	
Sfax	Tunisia	3.1 (2024)	660,000 (2024)	4,697
Shahriar, Tehran province	Iran	2.3 (2024)	410,000 (2024)	5,610
Shaki, Oyo State	Nigeria	1.4 (2023)	430,000 (2023)	3,256
Shanghai	China	795 (2025)	24,802,600 (2024)	32,067
Shantou	China	34.8 (2017)	5,502,031 (2020)	
Shaoxing	China	117.508 (2024)	5,411,500 (2024)	
Sheboygan, WI MSA	United States	8.738603 (2023)	117,752 (2023)	
Sheffield	United Kingdom	23.701 (2023)	573,252 (2023)	41,345
Sheikhupura	Pakistan	1.4 (2024)	570,000 (2024)	2,456
Shenyang	China	126.755 (2024)	9,223,500 (2024)	
Shenzhen	China	572 (2025)	20,500,000 (2025)	27,902
Sherbrooke	Canada	8.583 (2022)	231,055 (2022)	
Sherman-Denison, TX MSA	United States	7.289716 (2023)	146,907 (2023)	
Shijiazhuang	China	81.252 (2018)	11,235,086 (2020)	
Shiraz	Iran	14.3 (2024)	1,740,000 (2024)	8,218
Shizuishan	China	7.853 (2020)	751,389 (2020)	
Shizuoka	Japan	45.8 (2010)	3,765,007 (2010)	
Shreveport-Bossier City, LA MSA	United States	27.913122 (2022)	384,943 (2022)	
Shuozhou	China	15.955 (2020)	1,593,444 (2020)	
Sialkot	Pakistan	1.9 (2024)	770,000 (2024)	2,468
Sierra Vista-Douglas, AZ MSA	United States	6.080882 (2023)	124,640 (2023)	
Singapore	(ASEAN) Singapore	659.572 (2026)	6,121,000 (2026)	107,756
Sioux City, IA-NE-SD MSA	United States	11.978474 (2023)	144,402 (2023)	
Sioux Falls, SD MSA	United States	30.084975 (2023)	289,592 (2022)	
Sofia metropolitan area	(European Union) Bulgaria	39.335 (2021)	1,667,314 (2021)	
Sokoto (city)	Nigeria	1.6 (2023)	710,000 (2023)	2,254
Sorocaba	Brazil	12 (2023)	940,000 (2023)	12,766
South Bend-Mishawaka, IN-MI MSA	United States	20.547790 (2023)	324,490 (2023)	
Spartanburg, SC MSA	United States	21.159577 (2023)	383,327 (2023)	
Split, Croatia	(European Union) Croatia	6.115 (2022)	423,085 (2022)	
Spokane-Spokane Valley, WA MSA	United States	39.735793 (2023)	600,292 (2023)	
Springfield, IL MSA	United States	14.899178 (2023)	205,445 (2023)	
Springfield, MA MSA	United States	42.356150 (2023)	460,291 (2023)	
Springfield, MO MSA	United States	28.577385 (2023)	491,053 (2023)	
Springfield, OH MSA	United States	5.909466 (2023)	134,610 (2023)	
St. Catharines–Niagara Falls	Canada	15.642 (2022)	450,501 (2022)	
St. Cloud, MN MSA	United States	14.190740 (2023)	202,577 (2023)	
St. George, UT MSA	United States	10.742891 (2022)	197,730 (2022)	
St. John's, Newfoundland and Labrador	Canada	11.197 (2022)	219,119 (2022)	
St. Joseph, MO-KS MSA	United States	7.528526 (2023)	118,475 (2023)	
St. Louis, MO-IL (Metropolitan Statistical Area)	United States	236.782 (2024)	2,811,394 (2024)	84,222
State College, PA MSA	United States	10.952214 (2023)	157,795 (2023)	
Staunton, VA MSA	United States	6.760948 (2023)	126,776 (2022)	
Stockton, CA MSA	United States	42.836031 (2023)	793,229 (2022)	
Stoke-on-Trent	United Kingdom	9.701 (2023)	263,157 (2023)	36,864
Strasbourg	(European Union) France	48.99 (2021)	1,150,899 (2021)	
Stuttgart Metropolitan Region	(European Union) Germany	311.132 (2022)	5,506,959 (2022)	56,498
Suez	Egypt	3.6 (2024)	690,000 (2024)	5,217
Sukkur	Pakistan	1.1 (2024)	580,000 (2024)	1,897
Sulaymaniyah	Iraq	5.1 (2024)	820,000 (2024)	6,220
Sumter, SC MSA	United States	6.599335 (2023)	104,165 (2023)	
Sunderland	United Kingdom	11.133 (2023)	281,058 (2023)	39,611
Sunshine Coast	Australia	13.813 (2018–19)	333,436 (2018)	
Surabaya Metropolitan	(ASEAN) Indonesia	88.821 (2021)	6,150,000 (2021)	
Surat	India	40.7 (2023)	8,060,000 (2023)	5,050
Suzhou	China	388.485 (2025)	13,047,700 (2025)	29,774
Swansea	United Kingdom	9.084 (2023)	246,742 (2023)	36,816
Sydney	Australia	398 (2025)	5,600,000 (2025)	71,071
Sylhet	Bangladesh	3.2 (2024)	1,000,000 (2024)	3,200
Syracuse, NY MSA	United States	51.191017 (2023)	652,956 (2023)	
Szczecin metropolitan area	(European Union) Poland	8.483 (2021)	392,527 (2021)	
Székesfehérvár District	(European Union) Hungary	7.904 (2022)	418,555 (2022)	
Tabriz	Iran	12.7 (2024)	1,680,000 (2024)	7,560
Tabuk, Saudi Arabia	Saudi Arabia	14 (2024)	700,000 (2024)	20,000
Tacna	Peru	2.2 (2023)	340,000 (2023)	6,471
Taichung	Taiwan	63.910 (2016)	3,033,840 (2020)	
Taif	Saudi Arabia	12.3 (2024)	720,000 (2024)	17,083
Tainan	Taiwan	37.038 (2016)	1,875,076 (2020)	
Taipei–Keelung metropolitan area	Taiwan	375 (2025)	9,200,000 (2025)	40,761
Taiyuan	China	76.090 (2024)	5,479,700 (2024)	
Taizhou	China	98.585 (2024)	4,490,500 (2024)	
Taizhou, Zhejiang	China	93.466 (2024)	6,720,500 (2024)	
Tallahassee, FL MSA	United States	24.529748 (2023)	392,645 (2023)	
Harju County	(European Union) Estonia	30 (2025)	650,000 (2025)	46,154
Tampa-St. Petersburg-Clearwater, FL (Metropolitan Statistical Area)	United States	261.61 (2024)	3,405,357 (2024)	76,823
Tampere	(European Union) Finland	26.143 (2021)	520,691 (2021)	
Tampico metropolitan area	Mexico	12.4 (2023)	1,050,000 (2023)	11,810
Tangier	Morocco	18 (2026)	1,370,000 (2026)	13,100
Tangshan	China	140.471 (2024)	7,720,900 (2024)	
Tanta	Egypt	2.8 (2024)	530,000 (2024)	5,283
Taoyuan	Taiwan	52.010 (2016)	2,254,363 (2020)	
Taranto metropolitan area	(European Union) Italy	13.59 (2021)	561,958 (2021)	
Tarlac City	(ASEAN) Philippines	2.4 (2023)	390,000 (2023)	6,154
Tarnów metropolitan area	(European Union) Poland	5.098 (2021)	429,276 (2021)	
Tashkent	Uzbekistan	44 (2025)	5,200,000 (2025)	8,462
Taubaté	Brazil	4.8 (2023)	330,000 (2023)	14,545
Tbilisi	Georgia	14.131 (2023)	1,400,000 (2023)	
Tegucigalpa	Honduras	5 (2023)	1,570,000 (2023)	3,185
Tehran	Iran	67.6 (2024)	9,620,000 (2024)	7,027
Tehuacán	Mexico	2.5 (2023)	360,000 (2023)	6,944
Gush Dan	Israel	267 (2025)	3,100,000 (2025)	86,129
Tepic	Mexico	4.8 (2023)	580,000 (2023)	8,276
Teresina	Brazil	6.2 (2023)	1,060,000 (2023)	5,849
Terre Haute, IN MSA	United States	10.300542 (2023)	168,787 (2023)	
Tétouan	Morocco	2.4 (2026)	385,000 (2026)	6,290
Texarkana, TX-AR MSA	United States	7.215096 (2023)	145,907 (2023)	
The Hague	(European Union) Netherlands	66.276 (2021)	1,122,240 (2021)	
The Villages, FL MSA	United States	7.137460 (2023)	144,970 (2022)	
Thessaloniki	(European Union) Greece	18.926 (2021)	1,096,665 (2021)	
Thiruvananthapuram metropolitan area	India	10.2 (2023)	2,890,000 (2023)	3,529
Thrissur	India	12.3 (2023)	3,480,000 (2023)	3,534
Thủ Dầu Một	(ASEAN) Vietnam	4.6 (2023)	480,000 (2023)	9,583
Thunder Bay	Canada	6.029 (2022)	125,334 (2022)	
Tianjin	China	253.090 (2024)	13,640,000 (2024)	18,555
Tlaxcala (city)	Mexico	3.7 (2023)	630,000 (2023)	5,873
Tilburg	(European Union) Netherlands	24.617 (2021)	493,004 (2021)	
Tijuana metropolitan area	Mexico	32.4 (2023)	2,260,000 (2023)	14,336
Timișoara metropolitan area	(European Union) Romania	13.184 (2021)	705,500 (2021)	
Tokelau	Tokelau	0.009 (2015–16)	1,499 (2016)	
Toledo, OH MSA	United States	49.254628 (2023)	600,141 (2023)	
Tongling	China	18.612 (2024)	1,301,500 (2024)	
Toowoomba	Australia	7.118 (2018–19)	136,861 (2018)	
Topeka, KS MSA	United States	15.156457 (2023)	232,322 (2023)	
Toulouse Métropole	(European Union) France	85 (2025)	1,600,000 (2025)	53,125
Tours Métropole Val de Loire	(European Union) France	23.164 (2021)	612,237 (2021)	
Townsville	Australia	9.075 (2018–19)	180,820 (2018)	
Trinational Eurodistrict of Basel	Switzerland	89 (2025)	570,000 (2025)	156,140
Trenton-Princeton, NJ MSA	United States	53.002639 (2023)	381,671 (2023)	
Tripoli	Lybia	28 (2026)	2,400,000	11,700
Trois-Rivières	Canada	6.72 (2022)	167,732 (2022)	
Trondheim Region	Norway	30.919 (2021)	471,124 (2021)	
Trujillo metropolitan area (Peru)	Peru	5.7 (2023)	900,000 (2023)	6,333
Tucson, AZ MSA	United States	62.169929 (2023)	1,063,162 (2023)	
Tulsa, OK MSA	United States	67.510846 (2023)	1,044,757 (2023)	
Greater Tunis	Tunisia	26 (2026)	2,910,000	8,900
Turin metropolitan area	(European Union) Italy	89.713 (2021)	2,219,206 (2021)	
Turku metropolitan area	(European Union) Finland	23.664 (2021)	481,403 (2021)	
Tuscaloosa, AL MSA	United States	14.767427 (2023)	278,290 (2023)	
Tuxtla Gutiérrez	Mexico	3.9 (2023)	900,000 (2023)	4,333
Twin Falls, Idaho	United States	5.878 (2021)	117,150 (2021)	
Tyler, TX MSA	United States	15.683898 (2023)	245,209 (2023)	
Tyneside (Note: Tyneside includes Newcastle upon Tyne and the metropolitan boroughs of Gateshead, North Tyneside and South Tyneside.)	United Kingdom	35.206 (2023)	872,154 (2023)	40,367
Uberaba	Brazil	4.1 (2023)	350,000 (2023)	11,714
Uberlandia	Brazil	9.5 (2023)	720,000 (2023)	13,194
Umuahia	Nigeria	4.5 (2023)	900,000 (2023)	5,000
Uppsala	(European Union) Sweden	22.566 (2021)	388,394 (2021)	
Urban Honolulu, HI MSA	United States	81.675550 (2023)	989,408 (2023)	
Urmia	Iran	6.8 (2024)	850,000 (2024)	8,000
Uruapan	Mexico	2.4 (2023)	350,000 (2023)	4,333
Ürümqi	China	58.532 (2024)	4,084,800 (2024)	
Utica-Rome, NY MSA	United States	16.282294 (2023)	287,039 (2023)	
Utrecht	(European Union) Netherlands	98.493 (2021)	1,361,153 (2021)	
Uyo	Nigeria	6.1 (2023)	1,330,000 (2023)	4,586
Vadodara	India	11.2 (2023)	2,320,000 (2023)	4,828
Valdosta, GA MSA	United States	7.679252 (2023)	151,118 (2023)	
Vale do Aço metropolitan area	Brazil	5.3 (2023)	580,000 (2023)	9,138
Valencia metropolitan area	(European Union) Spain	81.660 (2023)	2,805,449 (2026)	
Valladolid	(European Union) Spain	17.760 (2023)	533,705 (2026)	
Valledupar	Colombia	2.7 (2023)	580,000 (2023)	4,655
Vallejo, CA MSA	United States	37.156243 (2023)	449,218 (2023)	
Valletta	(European Union) Malta	17.603 (2022)	486,087 (2022)	
Varna, Bulgaria	(European Union) Bulgaria	5.096 (2021)	470,124 (2021)	
Veracruz metropolitan area	Mexico	3.9 (2023)	900,000 (2023)	4,333
Verona metropolitan area	(European Union) Italy	38.437 (2021)	927,810 (2021)	
Victoria, British Columbia	Canada	20.763 (2022)	423,136 (2022)	
Victoria, TX MSA	United States	6.323208 (2023)	98,808 (2023)	
Vienna	(European Union) Austria	206 (2025)	3,200,000 (2025)	64,375
Vigo metropolitan area	(European Union) Spain	27.748 (2023)	950,414 (2026)	
Vijayawada	India	8.7 (2023)	2,230,000 (2023)	3,901
Villahermosa	Mexico	12.3 (2023)	940,000 (2023)	13,085
Villavicencio	Colombia	5 (2023)	570,000 (2023)	8,772
Vilnius urban area	(European Union) Lithuania	42.170 (2024)	888,712 (2026)	47,451
Vineland-Bridgeton, NJ MSA	United States	8.208721 (2023)	151,356 (2022)	
Virginia Beach-Norfolk-Newport News, VA-NC (Metropolitan Statistical Area)	United States	127.459149 (2023)	1,806,840 (2022)	
Visalia, CA MSA	United States	24.256732 (2022)	477,884 (2022)	
Visakhapatnam Metropolitan Region	India	10.2 (2023)	2,330,000 (2023)	4,378
Vitória da Conquista	Brazil	1.9 (2023)	340,000 (2023)	5,588
Vitoria-Gasteiz	(European Union) Spain	15.236 (2023)	344,665 (2026)	
Volta Redonda	Brazil	4.1 (2023)	500,000 (2023)	8,200
Vũng Tàu	(ASEAN) Vietnam	6.9 (2023)	450,000 (2023)	15,333
Waco, TX MSA	United States	18.135219 (2023)	304,865 (2023)	
Wagga Wagga	Australia	4.392 (2018–19)	56,442 (2018)	
Wah Cantonment	Pakistan	1.1 (2024)	470,000 (2024)	2,340
Walla Walla, WA MSA	United States	4.362362 (2023)	61,568 (2023)	
Warner Robins, GA MSA	United States	10.549159 (2023)	200,779 (2023)	
Warri	Nigeria	5.4 (2023)	990,000 (2023)	5,455
Warsaw metropolitan area	(European Union) Poland	193 (2025)	3,400,000 (2025)	56,765
Washington-Arlington-Alexandria, DC-VA-MD-WV (Metropolitan Statistical Area)	United States	780 (2025)	6,500,00 (2025)	120,000
Waterloo-Cedar Falls, IA MSA	United States	12.521946 (2023)	168,162 (2023)	
Watertown-Fort Drum, NY MSA	United States	8.037177 (2023)	114,787 (2023)	
Wausau-Weston, WI MSA	United States	12.711703 (2023)	166,334 (2022)	
Weihai	China	52.356 (2024)	2,914,100 (2024)	
Weirton-Steubenville, WV-OH MSA	United States	7.568043 (2023)	113,544 (2023)	
Wellington	New Zealand	26.607 (2022)	440,900 (2022)	
Wenatchee, WA MSA	United States	9.343442 (2023)	124,118 (2022)	
Wenzhou	China	136.467 (2024)	9,806,500 (2024)	
Wheeling, WV-OH MSA	United States	12.658006 (2023)	135,517 (2023)	
Wichita Falls, TX MSA	United States	8.256094 (2023)	149,947 (2023)	
Wichita, KS MSA	United States	46.468045 (2023)	652,939 (2023)	
Williamsport, PA MSA	United States	7.486729 (2023)	112,724 (2023)	
Wilmington, NC MSA	United States	21.996036 (2023)	467,337 (2023)	
Winchester, VA-WV MSA	United States	9.988848 (2023)	147,260 (2023)	
Windsor, Ontario	Canada	16.46 (2022)	359,672 (2022)	
Winnipeg Metropolitan Region	Canada	40.021 (2022)	871,778 (2022)	
Winston-Salem, NC MSA	United States	44.750605 (2023)	695,630 (2023)	
Witbank (Emahaleni)	South Africa	5.7 (2026)	534,000 (2026)	
Wollongong	Australia	5.624 (2018–19)	300,332 (2018–19)	
Worcester, MA-CT MSA	United States	64.135380 (2023)	980,137 (2022)	
Wrocław metropolitan area	(European Union) Poland	19.608 (2021)	670,219 (2021)	
Wuhai	China	8.363 (2024)	556,750 (2024)	
Wuhan	China	296.365 (2024)	13,791,550 (2024)	21,489
Wuhu	China	71.900 (2024)	1,790,000 (2024)	
Wuxi	China	228.362 (2024)	7,500,000 (2024)	30,448
Xalapa	Mexico	4.8 (2023)	810,000 (2023)	5,926
Xi'an	China	187.003 (2024)	13,122,900 (2024)	14,250
Xiamen	China	120.603 (2024)	5,338,500 (2024)	
Xiangtan	China	41.522 (2024)	2,696,500 (2024)	
Xiangyang	China	85.688 (2024)	5,279,100 (2024)	
Xilingol	China	17.355 (2024)	1,114,500 (2024)	
Xinyu	China	14.517 (2020)	1,202,499 (2020)	
Xuchang	China	50.008 (2020)	4,379,998 (2020)	
Xuzhou	China	133.916 (2024)	9,015,000 (2024)	
Yakima, WA MSA	United States	13.357488 (2023)	256,643 (2023)	
Yan'an	China	33.466 (2024)	2,254,650 (2024)	
Yanbu	Saudi Arabia	6.4 (2024)	360,000 (2024)	17,778
Yancheng	China	109.232 (2024)	6,680,000 (2024)	
Yangzhou	China	109.660 (2024)	4,585,900 (2024)	
Yantai	China	151.408 (2024)	7,033,700 (2024)	
Yazd	Iran	5 (2024)	600,000 (2024)	8,333
Yerevan	Armenia	5.23 (2018)	1,500,000 (2020)	
Yichang	China	86.933 (2024)	3,925,250 (2024)	
Yingtan	China	19.438 (2024)	1,148,350 (2024)	
York	United Kingdom	11.543 (2023)	206,780 (2023)	55,823
York-Hanover, PA MSA	United States	27.867147 (2023)	464,640 (2023)	
Youngstown-Warren-Boardman, OH-PA MSA	United States	26.178157 (2023)	535,499 (2022)	
Yuba City, CA MSA	United States	9.225272 (2023)	183,670 (2023)	
Yueyang	China	72.001 (2024)	4,989,450 (2024)	
Yulin	China	105.995 (2024)	3,607,300 (2024)	
Yuma, AZ MSA	United States	9.883 (2022)	208,874 (2022)	
Yuxi	China	36.257 (2024)	2,265,500 (2024)	
Zacatecas (city)	Mexico	4.2 (2023)	390,000 (2023)	10,769
Zagazig	Egypt	2.3 (2024)	380,000 (2024)	6,053
Zagreb metropolitan area	(European Union) Croatia	30.307 (2022)	1,187,450 (2022)	
Zahedan	Iran	3.1 (2024)	640,000 (2024)	4,844
Zamboanga City	(ASEAN) Philippines	3.6 (2023)	960,000 (2023)	3,750
Zanjan, Iran	Iran	3 (2024)	500,000 (2024)	6,000
Zaragoza metropolitan area	(European Union) Spain	37.073 (2023)	1,011,800 (2026)	
Zaria	Nigeria	2.7 (2023)	770,000 (2023)	3,506
Zarqa	Jordan	3.8 (2024)	750,000 (2024)	5,067
Zhangzhou	China	85.144 (2024)	5,069,500 (2024)	
Zhengzhou	China	204.054 (2024)	13,047,000 (2024)	15,640
Zhenjiang	China	77.791 (2024)	3,227,000 (2024)	
Zhuhai	China	62.893 (2024)	2,506,300 (2024)	
Zhoushan	China	31.260 (2024)	1,174,500 (2024)	
Zhuzhou	China	54.797 (2024)	3,844,900 (2024)	
Zibo	China	68.580 (2024)	4,655,350 (2024)	
Zurich Metropolitan Area	Switzerland	216 (2025)	1,600,000 (2025)	135,000
Zwolle	(European Union) Netherlands	20.455 (2021)	377,292 (2021)	

== Cities (metropolitan areas) by percentage of national GDP ==
This table contains only the first metropolitan area from a given country by GDP. Data for metropolitan areas is as in the previous section of this article. Data for countries is from List of countries by GDP (nominal) (IMF). Luxembourg City-Trier is partially in France but only Luxembourg's national GDP is considered.

Metropolitan area	GDP (billion USD)	Country	National GDP (billion USD)	% of national GDP
Valletta	17.603	Malta	19.225	91.563
City of San Marino	1.54	San Marino	1.70	90.872
Luxembourg City-Trier	69.45	Luxembourg	86.90	79.925
Asunción	31	Paraguay	43.14	71.859
Riga	27.156	Latvia	39.469	68.803
Tallinn	30	Estonia	47.004	63.824
Laayoune	2.5	Western Sahara	4.6	54.348
Kuwait City	84.8	Kuwait	160.902	52.703
Seoul	970	South Korea	1872.375	51.806
Dublin	371	Ireland	718.14	51.661
Abidjan	27	Ivory Coast	52.512	51.417
Bangkok	252.128	Thailand	495.622	50.871
Budapest	86.176	Hungary	177.788	48.471
Doha	105	Qatar	219.163	47.91
Copenhagen	220	Denmark	461.718	47.648
Sofia	39.335	Bulgaria	84.1	46.772
Cairo	169	Egypt	364.64	46.347
Tbilisi	14.131	Georgia	30.536	46.277
Dhaka	235	Bangladesh	462	46
Panama City	38.4	Panama	83.812	45.817
Athens	97.486	Greece	214.486	45.486
Lima	152	Peru	341.025	44.572
Tel Aviv	267	Israel	610.778	43.715
Vilnius	30.915	Lithuania	71.134	43.46
Zagreb	30.307	Croatia	72.059	42.059
Montevideo	33.3	Uruguay	79.214	42.038
Yerevan	5.23	Armenia	12.458	41.981
Manama	19.7	Bahrain	47.21	41.728
Santiago	146	Chile	355.346	41.087
Taipei	375	Taiwan	920.05	40.759
Dakar	15	Senegal	37.116	40.414
Belgrade	25.31	Serbia	62.787	40.311
Kuala Lumpur	184	Malaysia	472.193	38.967
San José	34.8	Costa Rica	87.524	39.761
Ljubljana	23.092	Slovenia	59.975	38.503
Prague	115.803	Czech Republic	301.831	38.367
Addis Ababa	61.2	Ethiopia	159.747	38.311
Tokyo	1675	Japan	4435.163	37.766
Buenos Aires	235.6	Argentina	648.895	36.308
Helsinki	115	Finland	316.86	36.294
Brussels	263	Belgium	724.917	36.28
Lisbon	92.003	Portugal	255.398	36.023
Auckland	103.240	New Zealand	278.236	37.102
Luanda	52	Angola	141.728	36.69
Dubai	209	United Arab Emirates	571.643	36.561
Accra	41	Ghana	114.708	35.743
Vienna	206	Austria	579.928	35.522
Kabul	6.00	Afghanistan	17.329	34.624
Riyadh	438	Saudi Arabia	1,276.943	34.301
Muscat	36.6	Oman	107.137	34.162
Bogotá	121.8	Colombia	366.901	33.197
Johannesburg	134.682	South Africa	406.755	33.111
Stockholm	221	Sweden	668.999	33.034
Jakarta	434.389	Indonesia	1396.302	31.110
Santo Domingo	37.5	Dominican Republic	120.794	31.045
Nairobi	42	Kenya	136.455	30.779
Paris	896.049	France	2968.405	30.186
London	1200	United Kingdom	4003.022	29.977
Tashkent	44	Uzbekistan	147.069	29.918
Istanbul	398.597	Turkey	1358.251	29.346
Bucharest	79.977	Romania	286.015	27.963
Bratislava	32.338	Slovakia	115.676	27.956
Minsk	19.913	Belarus	71.792	27.737
Oslo	140	Norway	530.756	26.377
Amman	15.4	Jordan	58.701	26.235
Ho Chi Minh City	128	Vietnam	494.046	25.909
Tunis	11.8	Tunisia	51.331	22.988
Guatemala City	23.9	Guatemala	104.354	22.903
Moscow	504.808	Russia	2269.899	22.239
Sydney	398	Australia	1839.961	21.631
San Salvador	7.3	El Salvador	33.854	21.563
Almaty	61.406	Kazakhstan	284.810	21.56
Toronto	481	Canada	2319.9	20.734
Zurich	216	Switzerland	1043.544	20.699
Madrid	385	Spain	1903.826	20.222
Managua	3.6	Nicaragua	17.813	20.21
Guayaquil	23.1	Ecudaor	120.793	19.124
Caracas	70	Venezuela	372.592	18.787
Santa Cruz de la Sierra	9.9	Bolivia	52.722	18.778
Warsaw	193	Poland	1,035.586	18.637
Manila	80	Philippines	437.055	18.304
Amsterdam	217.641	Netherlands	1214.562	17.919
Dar es Salaam	10.4	Tanzania	58.797	17.688
Kyiv	27.5	Ukraine	156.579	17.563
Tehran	67.6	Iran	416.676	16.224
Mexico City	276.7	Mexico	1749.41	15.42
São Paulo	319.3	Brazil	2191.137	14.572
Lagos	70.7	Nigeria	487.347	14.507
Baghdad	40.2	Iraq	286.523	14.03
Tegucigalpa	5	Honduras	34.356	14.553
Casablanca	22.1	Morocco	160.606	13.76
Milan	270.171	Italy	2180.657	12.389
Lahore	42.6	Pakistan	372.243	11.444
Rheinland	461.253	Germany	5048.0	9.22
Havana	21.4	Cuba	252.063	8.49
New York	2,600	United States	30767.075	8.451
Algiers	16.2	Algeria	269.14	6.019
Delhi	183.8	India	3500.906	5.25
Colombo	5.1	Sri Lanka	98.964	5.153
Shanghai	795	China	19626.247	4.052

== See also ==
- List of metropolitan areas by GDP (only covers GDP over US$100 billion)
- List of cheapest cities
- List of EU metropolitan regions by GDP
- List of United States metropolitan areas by GDP
- List of most expensive cities for expatriate employees
- List of first-level administrative divisions by GRDP
- List of ASEAN country subdivisions by GDP
