= Radio Minería =

Chile
- Frequencies: List: 1060 kHz (Santiago); 1440 kHz (Arica); 1500 kHz (Iquique); 590 kHz (Antofagasta); 1250 kHz (La Serena); 800 kHz (Greater Valparaíso); 1220 kHz (Greater Temuco); 1450 kHz (Puerto Varas); 95.3 MHz (Coyhaique); 1260 kHz (Punta Arenas)

Ownership
- Owner: Sociedad Nacional de Minería (1941-1970); Cruzat-Larraín Group (1976-1991); Holanda Comunicaciones (1991-1999)
- Sister stations: Radio Galaxia (1975-1991)

History
- First air date: July 16, 1941
- Last air date: March 31, 1999; 26 years ago
- Former call signs: List: CB-106 (Santiago); CA-144 (Arica); CA-150 (Iquique); CA-59 (Antofagasta); CA-125 (La Serena); CB-80 (Greater Valparaíso); CD-122 (Temuco); CD-145 (Puerto Varas); XQD-170 (Coyhaique); CD-126 (Punta Arenas)

Radio Minería was a Chilean radio station that operated from 22 June 1941 to 31 March 1999.

Radio Mineria was founded by the Sociedad Nacional de Minería (National Mining Society) (SONAMI).
