= List of cheapest cities =

Lists of the world's cheapest cities are developed by different institutions.

== Economist Intelligence Unit ==
The Economist Intelligence Unit has analyzed the prices of more than 160 products and services in each city. The survey has been done considering the base city as New York, which has an index set at 100. Based on the survey of the Economist Intelligence Unit there are slight changes in the 2020 ranking of the cheapest cities in the world as compared to 2019. One city from Pakistan and three major cities from India all are in the top ten cheapest cities in 2020. The main reason behind this is the low wages and high levels of income inequality, which restrict household expenses, as well as market competition.

The ten cheapest cities in the world 2020 according to an Economist Intelligence Unit survey.

1. Damascus, Syria
2. Tashkent, Uzbekistan
3. Almaty, Kazakhstan
4. Buenos Aires, Argentina
5. Karachi , Pakistan
6. Caracas, Venezuela
7. Lusaka, Zambia
8. Chennai, India
9. Bangalore, India
10. New Delhi, India

== TripIndex ==
According to TripIndex by TripAdvisor, last updated in 2016, five of ten cheapest cities in the world were located in Asia, with four of them located in ASEAN/South Asian countries. The research was based on costs of a one-night stay in a four-star hotel, cocktails, a two-course dinner with a bottle of wine, and a taxi transport (two return journeys of about 3.2 kilometres each). First was Hanoi with $141.12, second was Beijing with $159.05, third was Bangkok with $161.90, fifth was Kuala Lumpur with $194.43 and eighth was Jakarta with $204.59.

== See also ==
- List of most expensive cities for expatriate employees
- Poverty threshold
- South-East Asian Tourism Organisation
