= South-East Asian Tourism Organisation =

Multinational tourism organization in South-East Asia

- Formation: 2009
- Website: www.seato.org

The South-East Asian Tourism Organisation (SEATO) is a working group formed by both government and non-government tourism organizations operating in Southeast Asia. SEATO was formed in late 2009 with the aim of spreading the financial impacts of tourism more widely into the kampongs and villages of the region.

== Cheapest cities ==
According to TripIndex by TripAdvisor, five of ten cheapest cities in the world are located in Asia which four of them are located in ASEAN/Southeast Asia countries.

The research based on two of a one-night stay in a four-star hotel, cocktails, a two-course dinner with a bottle of wine, and a taxi transport (two return journeys of about 3.2 kilometres each).

First is Hanoi with $141.12, second is Beijing with $159.05, third is Bangkok with $161.90, fifth is Kuala Lumpur with $194.43 and eight is Jakarta with $204.59.

== See also ==
- Southeast Tourism Society
- Motorbike travel across Vietnam
