= Okpogho =

- Indigenous Peoples Community
- Nickname: Diji Onwa-Náka
- Location within Nigeria
- Coordinates: 6°26′0″N 7°16′0″E
- Country: Nigeria
- State: Enugu State

Government
  - Traditional Ruler: HRM IGWE Apst. Linus Pius Chimereze
  - Town Union President: Mr Vincent Chude
  - Youth President: Mr Sylvester Jedeofor Enezu
- Elevation: 166 m (545 ft)

Population (2015)
  - Total: 342,800
- Time zone: WAT
- Website: okpogho.org

Okpogho is a city in Enugu State, Nigeria.
