= Greater Temuco =

Conurbation in Chile

Coordinates: 38°45′S 72°40′W

Greater Temuco is a conurbation of the cities of Temuco and Padre Las Casas in the Araucanía Region of southern Chile.
