= Yahualica, Hidalgo =

Yahualica
- Town and municipality
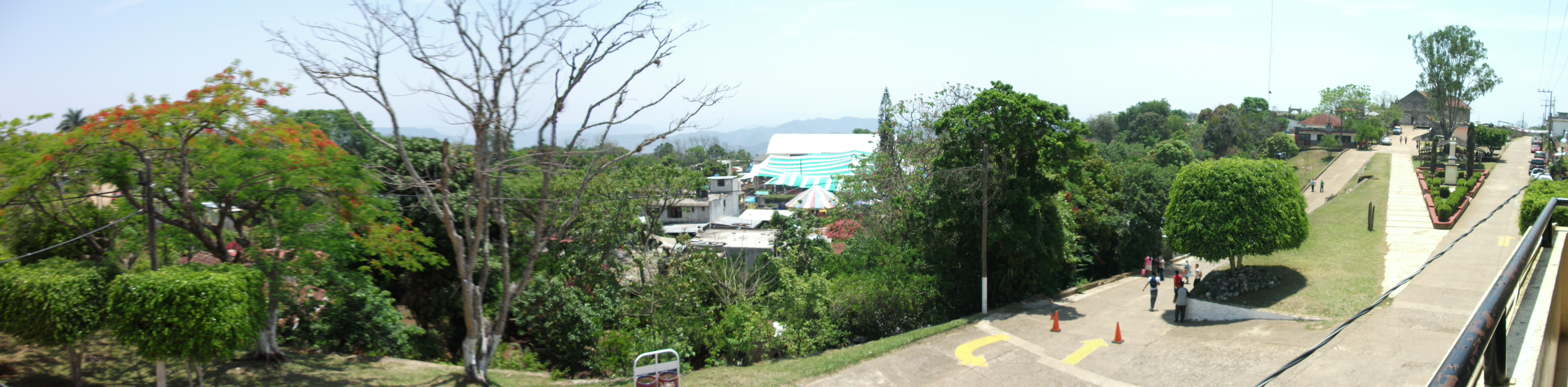
- Central Yahualica, 2011

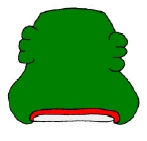
- Coat of arms

- Location within Hidalgo Location within Mexico
- Coordinates: 20°57′11″N 98°22′48″W
- Country: Mexico
- State: Hidalgo
- Municipality: Yahualica

Government
  - Type: Municipalities of Hidalgo
  - Federal electoral district: Hidalgo's 1st

Area
  - Total: 164.5 km^{2} (63.5 sq mi)

Population (2005)
  - Total: 22,228
- Time zone: UTC-6 (Zona Centro)
- Postal codes: 42,000
- Area code: 771
- Website: yahualicahgo.gob.mx

Yahualica is a town and one of the 84 municipalities of Hidalgo, in central-eastern Mexico. The municipality covers an area of 164.5 km^{2} (63.5 sq mi).

As of 2005, the municipality had a total population of 22,228.

== History ==
- Pre-Hispanic Mexico.
  - 1050; The Otomi settle in Njunthé, very close to the current city of Pachuca.
  - 1438; it was founded by a Mexican group that called it Patlachiuhcan.
- New Spain.
  - 1528; the Spanish conquerors call the place "Real de Minas de Pachuca".
  - 1553; stands as Alcalde mayor.
  - 1786; as a result of the Bourbon reforms it becomes subdelegation of the Intendencia de México.
  - 1787; the Province of Pachuca is created, dependent on the Municipality of Mexico.
  - 1813; Pachuca receives the title of City, through the payment of 3,000 pesos made by Francisco de Paula Villaldea.
- First Federal Republic of Mexico.
  - August 6, 1824; Pachuca is registered as partido belonging to the district of Tulancingo.
  - April 8, 1825; To the Pachuca party is added the territory of the extinct Zempoala party and part of the Tetepango party.
  - February 15, 1826; Pachuca is registered as municipal council belonging to the party of the same name of the prefecture of Tulancingo.
- Centralist Republic of Mexico.
  - December 23, 1837; Pachuca is registered as a party belonging to the district of Tulancingo.
- Second Federal Republic of Mexico.
  - July 31, 1861; Pachuca is registered as a party of the district of the same name in the State of Mexico.
  - October 15, 1861; Pachuca is registered as a district of the State of Mexico.
  - November 14, 1861; All the capitals of the districts will have the title of villas in the state of Mexico. Pachuca will henceforth be called Pachuca de Guerrero.
- French Intervention and Second Mexican Empire.
  - May 22, 1862; Pachuca as a district is part of military canton number 3 of the State of Mexico.
  - August 3, 1862; Pachuca as a district is part of the second military district, of the State of Mexico.
  - August 8, 1865; Pachuca is registered as a municipality, belonging to the district of the same name.
- Restored Republic.
  - January 16, 1869; The district of Pachuca is segregated from the State of Mexico to erect that of Hidalgo.
  - May 21, 1871; Pachuca as a district is part of the state of Hidalgo.
- Porfiriato and Mexican Revolution.
  - September 15, 1894; Pachuca is a district of the state of Hidalgo.
  - April 13, 1920; The municipality of Mineral de la Reforma is erected in the jurisdiction of the district of Pachuca.
  - September 21, 1920; Pachuca is registered as a free municipality, forming part of the district of the same name.
- Contemporary Mexico.
  - September 8, 1935; The district of Pachuca is formed with the municipalities of Pachuca, Mineral del Monte, Mineral del Chico, Mineral de la Reforma, Epazoyucan, Tolcayuca, Tizayuca, Tezontepec, Zempoala and Zapotlán de Juárez.
  - January 16, 1987; Pachuca de Guerrero is registered as Pachuca de Soto.
  - September 6, 1993; Pachuca de Soto as a municipality is part of the state of Hidalgo.

== See also ==
- Tlalchiyahualica
