= Felipe Ángeles (inter-city train) =

Mexican inter-city rail line

Overview
- Owner: Train and Integrated Public Transport Agency (ATTRAPI)
- Locale: Greater Mexico City; State of Mexico; Hidalgo
- Termini: Buenavista; Pachuca
- Stations: 12

Service
- Type: Inter-city rail
- Operator: Olmeca-Maya-Mexica

History
- Construction began: 24 March 2025
- Opening date: Early 2027

Technical
- Track length: 92 kilometres (57 mi) (Buenavista-Pachuca); 57.56 kilometres (35.77 mi) (Lecheria–AIFA)
- Num of tracks: 2
- Track gauge: 1,435 mm (4 ft 8 1/2 in) standard gauge
- Electrification: 25 kV 60 Hz AC overhead lines
- Operating speed: 120 km/h (75 mph)

The Felipe Ángeles is a future passenger train connecting Mexico City with the Pachuca metropolitan area in Hidalgo, passing through the states of Hidalgo and Mexico. The project was announced by Claudia Sheinbaum on 10 July 2024, as part of the first phase of passenger train construction under Mexico's National Railway Program (2018–2050). Construction began on March 24, 2025, and the project is expected to be completed in the first quarter of 2027.

As of April 2026, the overall construction is 30% complete.

== History ==
On November 20, 2023, President Andrés Manuel López Obrador announced the reactivation of seven passenger train routes following a decree, including the AIFA-Pachuca route.

On October 6, 2024, the Mexico-Pachuca Train project was officially launched, with preliminary work and right-of-way studies for the construction of the section: AIFA to Pachuca, with a length of 55.8 km, passing through the following municipalities: Zumpango, Tecámac, Nextlapan and Temascalapa in the State of Mexico; Tizayuca, Zapotlán, Zempoala, Villa de Tezontepec , Jaltocán , Pachuca de Soto and Mineral de la Reforma in Hidalgo.

On March 22, 2025, President Claudia Sheinbaum, together with the company Olmeca-Maya-Mexica, initiated the construction of the train, beginning with the AIFA-Pachuca section, utilizing the infrastructure of the Buenavista-AIFA train in the Lechería-Xaltocan section.

The construction of the train will generate approximately 260,000 jobs, both direct and indirect, by 2025. This project is supported by the Felipe Ángeles Engineering Group , in collaboration with the Secretariat of Infrastructure, Communications and Transportation (SICT) and the National Institute of Anthropology and History (INAH), who will be in charge of different aspects of the work;

The Secretariat of National Defense (SEDENA), through its "Felipe Ángeles" Engineering Group, is leading the construction of the train and its corresponding structures, demonstrating its experience in previous infrastructure projects, such as the Felipe Ángeles International Airport (AIFA) and the Tren Maya.

- The Secretariat of Infrastructure, Communications and Transportation (SICT) plays a crucial role in the planning, coordination and supervision of the train, with a clear vision of expanding the passenger rail network in the country.
- The National Institute of Anthropology and History (INAH) is committed to protecting and recovering the archaeological and historical heritage that may be found along the train construction routes.

On April 26, 2026, almost at the end of the inauguration of the Buenavista-AIFA section of the Felipe Ángeles, the president confirmed the name that had been announced in previous conferences:

A revolutionary general... Proudly from Hidalgo. This train that connects Mexico City, the State of Mexico, and the State of Hidalgo will, from today forward, bear the name of the Felipe Ángeles Train. (Note: Spanish: Un general revolucionario... Orgullosamente hidalguense. Este tren que conecta Ciudad de México, Estado de México y el Estado de Hidalgo, pues llevará el nombre, a partir de hoy, del Tren Felipe Ángeles.)

— Claudia Sheinbaum

== Characteristics ==
The passenger train will have 57.56 kilometres (35.77 mi) of electrified double track on the existing right-of-way, a fleet of electric trains with a maximum design speed of 120 km/h, and a capacity of 718 passengers. It will have an infrastructure of 2 viaducts totalling 5.89 kilometres (3.66 mi), 4 electrical substations, 51.67 kilometres (32.11 mi) of cut and fill, and 57.56 km of overhead wires.

=== Rolling stock ===
On September 12, 2025, the Railway Transport Regulatory Agency (ARTF) (Note: which was renamed to the Train and Integrated Public Transport Agency (ATTRAPI) in January 2026) announced the consortium formed by the Chinese company CRRC Zhuzhou Locomotive Co., Ltd. and the Mexican company Mexico Railway Transportation Equipment S. de RL de CV as the winner of the public tender for the construction of the train's rolling stock. The proposal from the consortium led by CRRC beat the one led by the Spanish company CAF.

The project comprises the acquisition of 15 electric trains equipped with the European Rail Traffic Management System (ERTMS), including their commissioning, comprehensive maintenance for five years, and workshop equipment, under a contract for $5.846 billion pesos (VAT included).
