= Church and former convent of Todos los Santos =

Church in Mexico

Coordinates: 19.9149°N 98.6694°W

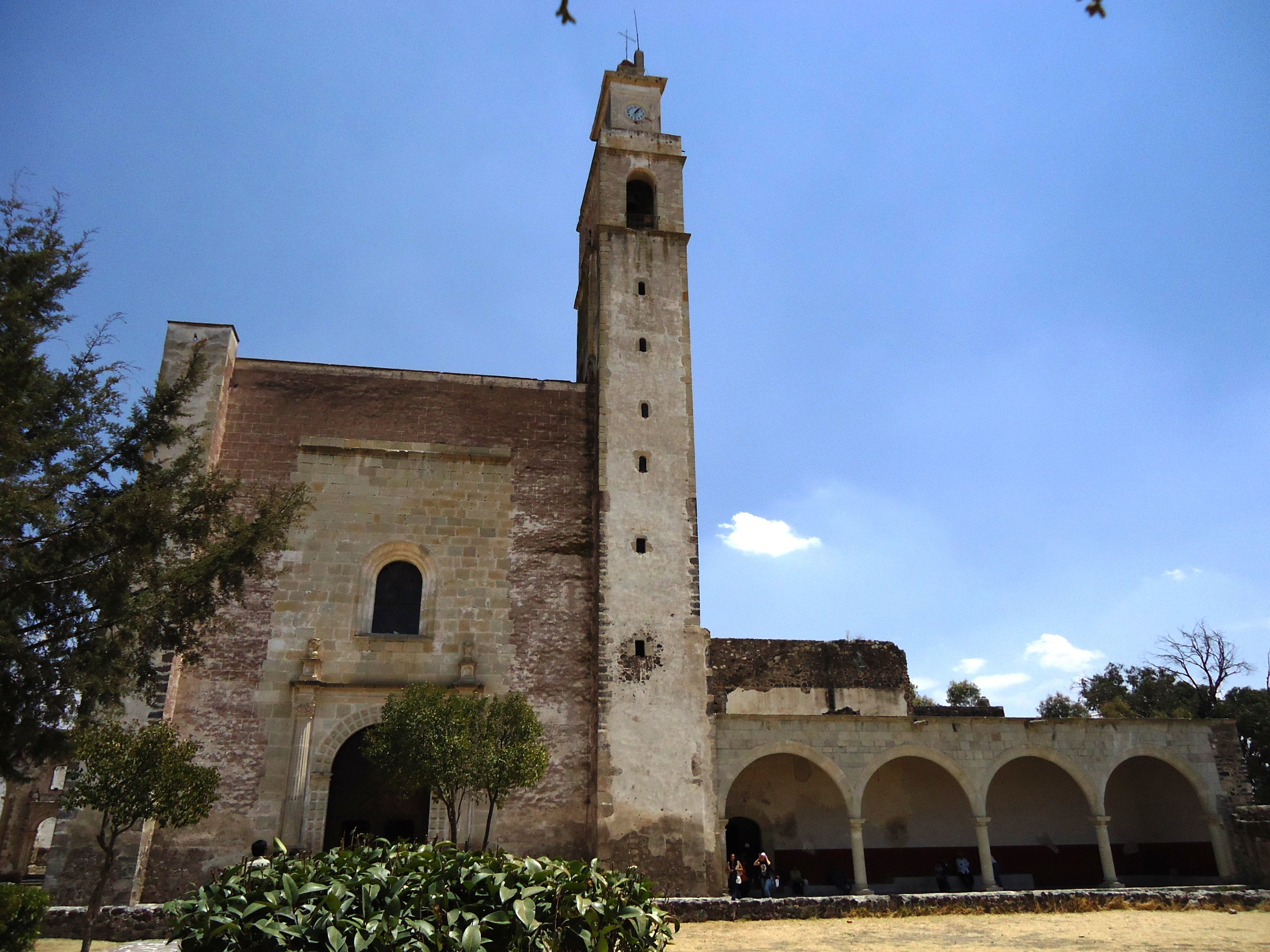
- Façade and pilgrims' portal.

Religion
- Affiliation: Catholic Church
- Diocese: Archdiocese of Tulancingo
- Ecclesiastical or organizational status: Parish Church
- Year consecrated: 1753 (secularization)
- Status: Open to worship

Location
- Interactive map of Church and former convent of Todos los Santos

Architecture
- Groundbreaking: 1570
- Completed: 1585

The church and former convent of Todos los Santos is located in Zempoala, Hidalgo (state), Mexico. It was built by the Franciscan Order, and in 1570 the construction of the church and convent began, and by 1585 they were finished. The architectural ensemble is composed of: the atrium, the open chapel, the church and the convent.

== History ==
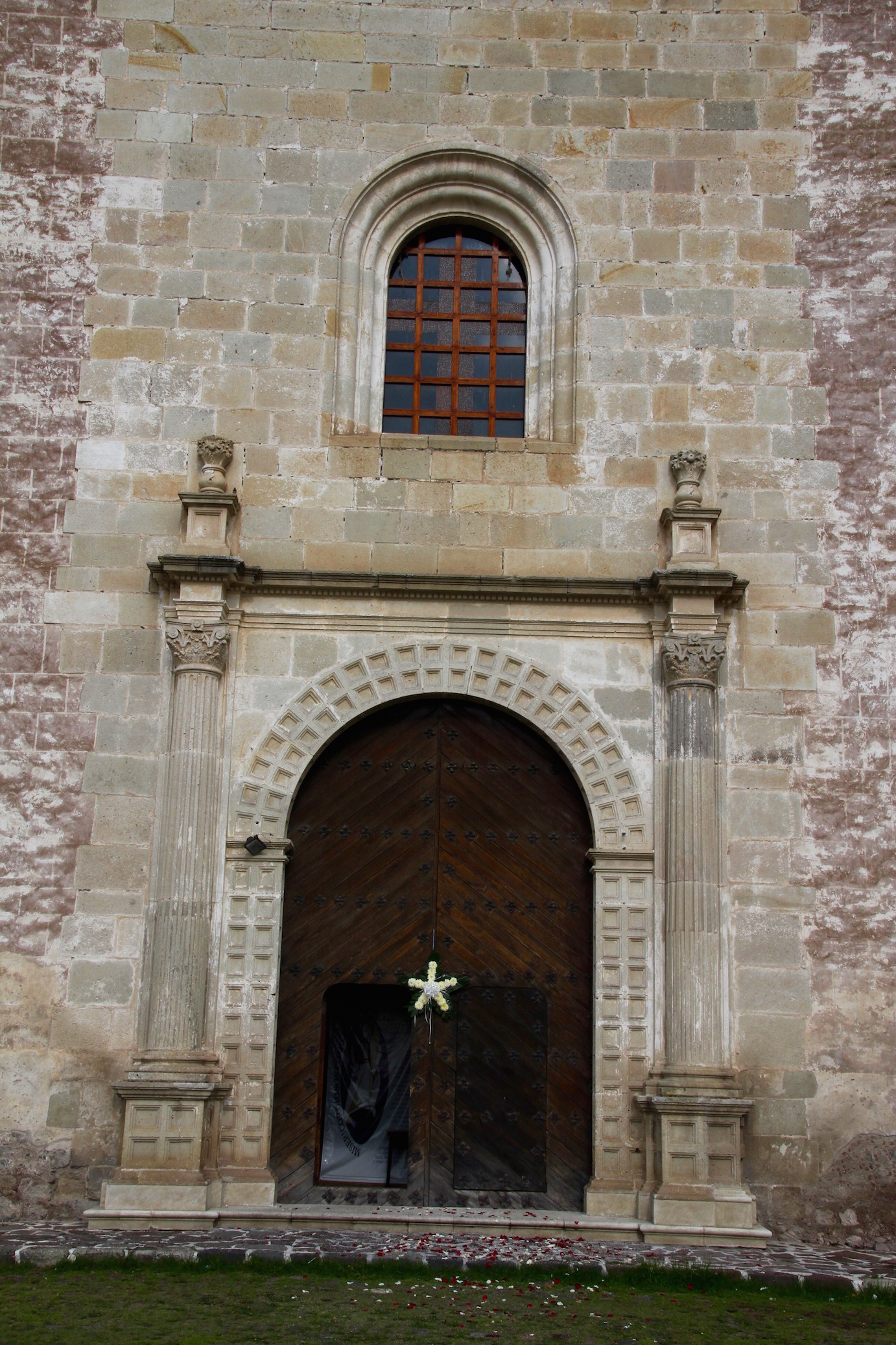
Detail of the main facade.

The conquest of Mexico by Hernán Cortés, was consummated with the surrender of Tenochtitlan on August 13, 1521. The work of evangelization in New Spain began in 1524 when twelve Franciscans arrived, in 1526 the same number of Dominidians and in 1533 seven Augustines. In the state of Hidalgo it began when the Franciscans arrived in Tepeapulco in 1527 and the augustines bequea bequea bequeous to Atotonilco the Great and Metztitlán in 1536. Presumably, in Zempoala the work of evangelization began with the friars Franciscans who arrived at Tepeapulco and was visited by this town due to their closeness, this until 1540.

In 1540, the Spaniards settled in the region, their first encomendero being Juan Pérez de Gama, who renounced his rights in favor of the lawyer Rodrigo de Sandoval. This year the Franciscans were replaced by the Augustines; who built a house, playing the priory Fray Nicolás de Agreda, that the following year he was appointed prosecutor to go to Castilla, where he left at the beginning of January. The population was very large in Zempoala and its neighboring towns, given the small number of friars the Augustinians abandon it. In 1553, the Augustinians separated, the Franciscans reestablished themselves but in insufficient numbers to attend to spiritual needs.

On January 7, 1553, a contract was concluded with the religious of Otumba, who were forced to provide friars to those of Zempoala in exchange for water; which was done with the Aqueduct of Padre Tembleque. The Franciscans remained 32 years /> Zempoala and its subject peoples belonged in the year 1580, to the jurisdiction of the Archbishopric of Mexico. In 1585 the Augustinians return, imprinting their mark on evangelization and on some architectural details of the convent. The parish was secularized on May 20, 1753, the first priest of the secular clergy being the priest Esteban Mateos.

== Details ==
Its architectural style projects an image of the so-called fortress convents, with high walls ending in battlements and a plateresque façade; is particularly noteworthy for its tall and slender bell tower. Also noteworthy in the convent is an open chapel with two huge access arches and two large naves. The temple preserves remains of mural painting with religious scenes inside, as well as on the walls of the annexed convent, where you can still see paintings showing scenes from the Passion of Christ.

The Padre Tembleque Aqueduct was named a World Heritage Site on July 5, 2015. Within this declaration there are 6540 ha of protection zone and 34 820 ha of zone of respect; within this declaration is the Temple and former convent of All Saints.

== Sources ==
- Azcue y Mancera, Luis; Fernández, Justino; Toussaint, Manuel (1942). Catálogo de construcciones religiosas del estado de Hidalgo. Volumen II. Ciudad de México, México: Secretaría de Hacienda y Crédito Público: Dirección General de Bienes Nacionales.
- Ballesteros García, Víctor Manuel (2003). La iglesia y el convento de todos los santos de Zempoala, Hidalgo y su comarca. Pachuca, Hidalgo: Colección Patrimonio cultural hidalguense-UAEH. ISBN 9789686340853.
- Castilla Ángeles, Rubén; Garnica Romero, Violeta; Hernández Martínez, María del Consuelo; Rodríguez Arenas, Hugo; Toledano Pérez, Manuel; Torres Martínez, Amílcar; Torres Vivar, Francisco Alejandro (2012). Comisión Nacional de Libros de Texto Gratuito (ed.). La entidad donde vivo. Hidalgo. Tercer grado (PDF) (Second ed.). México, D. F: Secretaría de Educación Pública. ISBN 978-607-469-934-0. Archived from the original (PDF) on 25 December 2014.
- Corvera Poiré, Marcela; Ortiz Hernández, Eliza (2016). Colección: Historia y patrimonio: La pintura mural del presbiterio de la iglesia de Zempoala, Hidalgo. Pachuca, Hidalgo: Gobierno del Estado de Hidalgo, Consejo Estatal para la Cultura y las Artes de Hidalgo. ISBN 978-607-7878-88-9.
- Garibay Álvarez, Jorge (2011). Inventario del Archivo Parroquial Todos los Santos, Zempoala, Hidalgo (PDF). Coyoacán, Ciudad de México: Apoyo Al Desarrollo de Archivos y Bibliotecas de México. ISBN 978-607-416-220-2.
- Lorenzo Monterrubio, Carmen; Lorenzo Monterrubio, Antonio (2012). Colección Hidalguense: Zempoala, veinte días. Pachuca, Hidalgo: Mina Editorial para la Dirección General de Publicaciones e Impresos del Gobierno del Estado de Hidalgo.
- Schávelzon, Daniel (2014). "El juego del volador en Zempoala, Hidalgo/ Tipología de las maquetas prehispánicas de Mezcala, México" (PDF). Material de Lectura (10). México, D.F.: Universidad Nacional Autónoma de México.
- Velázquez Chávez, Agustín (1986). La pintura colonial en Hidalgo en tres siglos de pintura colonial mexicana. Pachuca de Soto, Hidalgo: Gobierno del Estado de Hidalgo, Coordinación de Turismo, Cultura y Recreación.
