= Huitzila =

Huitzila may refer to the following places in Mexico:

- Huitzila, Hidalgo
- Huitzila, Zacatecas

== See also ==
- Huitzilac
