= Yahualica =

Yahualica may refer to:

- Yahualica de González Gallo, a town and municipality in Jalisco, Mexico
- Yahualica, Hidalgo, a town and municipality in Hidalgo, Mexico
