= List of Intangible Cultural Heritage elements in Mexico =

The United Nations Educational, Scientific and Cultural Organisation (UNESCO) identifies intangible cultural heritage as the "non-physical traditions and practices that are performed by a people". As part of a country's cultural heritage, they include celebrations, festivals, performances, oral traditions, music, and the making of handicrafts. The "intangible cultural heritage" is defined by the Convention for the Safeguarding of Intangible Cultural Heritage, drafted in 2003 and took effect in 2006. Inscription of new heritage elements on the UNESCO Intangible Cultural Heritage Lists is determined by the Intergovernmental Committee for the Safeguarding of Intangible Cultural Heritage, an organisation established by the convention.

Mexico ratified the convention on 14 December 2005.

== Intangible Cultural Heritage of Humanity ==
+ Transnational element

=== Representative List ===
Name	Image	Year	No.	Description
Indigenous festivity dedicated to the dead		2008	00054	Day of the Dead, as practised by the indigenous communities.
Ritual ceremony of the Voladores		2009	00175	The ritual of the Voladores consists of dance and the climbing of a 30 metres (98 ft) pole from which four of the five participants then launch themselves tied with ropes to descend to the ground.
Places of memory and living traditions of the Otomí-Chichimecas people of Tolimán: the Peña de Bernal, guardian of a sacred territory		2009	00174	
Traditional Mexican cuisine - ancestral, ongoing community culture, the Michoacán paradigm		2010	00400	
Parachicos in the traditional January feast of Chiapa de Corzo		2010	00399	Parachicos are traditional dancers from Chiapa de Corzo who dance on the streets of the town during the Grand Fiesta festivities, which take place from January 15 to 23 every year.
Pirekua, traditional song of the P'urhépecha		2010	00398	
Mariachi, string music, song and trumpet		2011	00575	Mariachi is an ensemble of musicians that typically play ranchera, the regional Mexican music dating back to at least the 18th century.
Charrería, equestrian tradition in Mexico		2016	01108	Charrería, also known as Jaripeo, is a sport and discipline arising from equestrian activities and livestock traditions used in the haciendas of the Viceroyalty of New Spain.
La Romería (the pilgrimage): ritual cycle of 'La llevada' (the carrying) of the Virgin of Zapopan		2018	01400	The romería of the Virgin of Zapopan is an annual pilgrimage from the Guadalajara Cathedral to the Basilica of Our Lady of Zapopan.
Artisanal talavera of Puebla and Tlaxcala (Mexico) and ceramics of Talavera de la Reina and El Puente del Arzobispo (Spain) making process + (Note: Shared with Spain.)		2019	01462	The processes of making the artisanal talavera of Puebla and Tlaxcala (Mexico) and ceramics of Talavera de la Reina and El Puente del Arzobispo (Toledo, Spain)
Bolero: identity, emotion and poetry turned into song + (Note: Shared with Cuba.)		2023	01990	Bolero is a genre of song which originated in eastern Cuba in the late 19th century as part of the trova tradition
Representation of the Passion, Death and Resurrection of Christ in Iztapalapa		2025	02237	The Passion Play of Iztapalapa is an annual event during Holy Week in the Iztapalapa borough of Mexico City.

=== Good Safeguarding Practices ===
Name	Year	No.	Description
Xtaxkgakget Makgkaxtlawana: the Centre for Indigenous Arts and its contribution to safeguarding the intangible cultural heritage of the Totonac people of Veracruz, Mexico	2012	00666	

== See also ==
- List of World Heritage Sites in Mexico
