= Emiliano Zapata, Hidalgo =

Emiliano Zapata
- Town and municipality
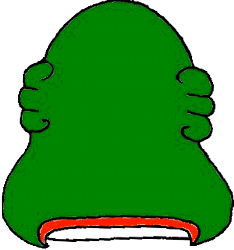
- Coat of arms

- Location within Hidalgo Location within Mexico
- Coordinates: 19°39′N 98°33′W
- Country: Mexico
- State: Hidalgo
- Municipality: Emiliano Zapata

Government
  - Federal electoral district: Hidalgo's 7th

Area
  - Total: 36 km^{2} (14 sq mi)

Population (2005)
  - Total: 12,309
- Time zone: UTC-6 (Zona Centro)
- Website: emilianoz.gob.mx

Emiliano Zapata is a town and one of the 84 municipalities of Hidalgo, in central-eastern Mexico. The municipality covers an area of 36 km^{2} (14 sq mi).

As of 2005, the municipality had a total population of 12,309.
