= Francisco González Vargas =

Mexican politician (born 1956)

- Born: 2 September 1956 (age 69); Huazalingo, Hidalgo, Mexico
- Occupation: Deputy
- Political party: PRI

Francisco González Vargas (born 2 September 1956) is a Mexican politician affiliated with the Institutional Revolutionary Party (PRI). In 2012–2015 he served as a federal deputy in the 62nd Congress, representing Hidalgo's seventh district.
