= Apan =

- City and municipality
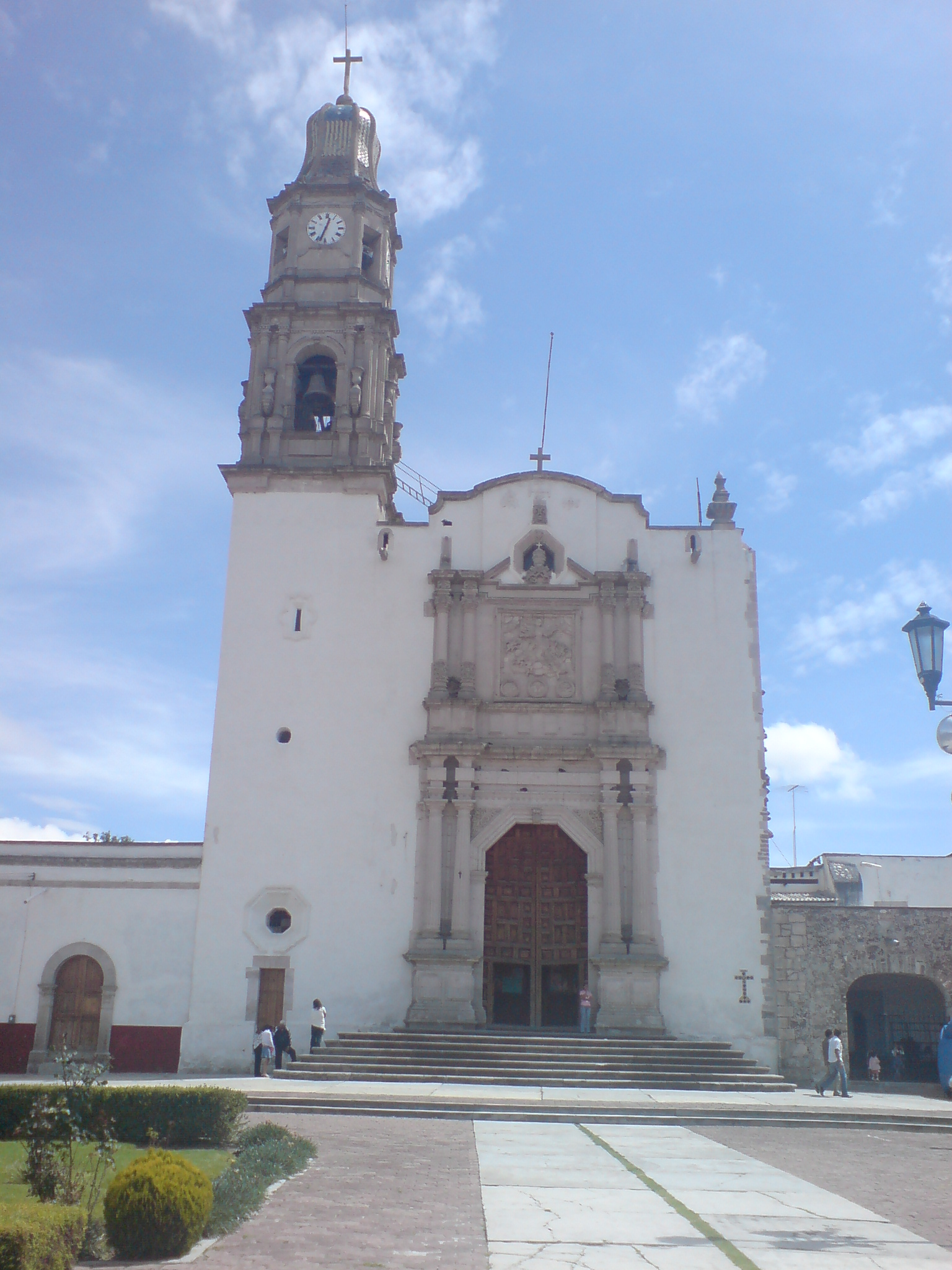

- Glyph or Coat of arms

- Location within Hidalgo Location within Mexico
- Coordinates: 19°42′N 98°26′W
- Country: Mexico
- State: Hidalgo
- Municipality: Apan

Government
  - Federal electoral district: Hidalgo's 7th

Area
  - Total: 346.9 km^{2} (133.9 sq mi)
- Elevation: 2,468 m (8,097 ft)

Population (2005)
  - Total: 39,247
- Time zone: UTC-6 (Zona Centro)
- Website: apan.gob.mx

Apan is a city and one of the 84 municipalities of Hidalgo, in central-eastern Mexico. The municipality covers an area of 346.9 km^{2}.

== Climate ==
Climate data for Apan (1991–2020)
Month	Jan	Feb	Mar	Apr	May	Jun	Jul	Aug	Sep	Oct	Nov	Dec	Year
Record high °C (°F)	29.0 (84.2)	31.0 (87.8)	33.0 (91.4)	35.0 (95.0)	34.0 (93.2)	33.5 (92.3)	30.0 (86.0)	29.0 (84.2)	30.0 (86.0)	29.0 (84.2)	34.0 (93.2)	28.0 (82.4)	35.0 (95.0)
Mean daily maximum °C (°F)	20.9 (69.6)	23.0 (73.4)	25.2 (77.4)	26.9 (80.4)	27.1 (80.8)	25.5 (77.9)	24.2 (75.6)	24.0 (75.2)	23.2 (73.8)	22.5 (72.5)	21.8 (71.2)	21.2 (70.2)	23.8 (74.8)
Daily mean °C (°F)	10.8 (51.4)	12.6 (54.7)	14.7 (58.5)	16.7 (62.1)	17.3 (63.1)	17.1 (62.8)	16.1 (61.0)	16.1 (61.0)	15.8 (60.4)	14.4 (57.9)	12.6 (54.7)	11.2 (52.2)	14.6 (58.3)
Mean daily minimum °C (°F)	0.7 (33.3)	2.3 (36.1)	4.2 (39.6)	6.5 (43.7)	7.6 (45.7)	8.7 (47.7)	8.1 (46.6)	8.2 (46.8)	8.3 (46.9)	6.4 (43.5)	3.3 (37.9)	1.3 (34.3)	5.5 (41.9)
Record low °C (°F)	−9.0 (15.8)	−8.0 (17.6)	−7.5 (18.5)	−3.0 (26.6)	0.0 (32.0)	0.0 (32.0)	2.0 (35.6)	2.0 (35.6)	−3.0 (26.6)	−6.0 (21.2)	−7.5 (18.5)	−8.5 (16.7)	−9.0 (15.8)
Average precipitation mm (inches)	10.8 (0.43)	17.1 (0.67)	18.6 (0.73)	39.9 (1.57)	60.9 (2.40)	107.7 (4.24)	110.1 (4.33)	101.8 (4.01)	106.8 (4.20)	57.2 (2.25)	17.8 (0.70)	8.7 (0.34)	657.4 (25.88)
Average rainy days	2.5	3.0	4.6	8.2	10.4	13.3	16.3	15.0	15.1	9.4	3.4	1.6	102.8
Source: Servicio Meteorologico Nacional

== Overview-Twin Towns-sister Cities ==
As of 2005, the municipality had a total population of 39,247.

It was an important site in the War of Independence (1810–1821). It is a center for the production of pulque and for the sport of charrería, or Mexican rodeo.

Apan's sister city is Elkhart, Indiana, United States.

== Gallery ==
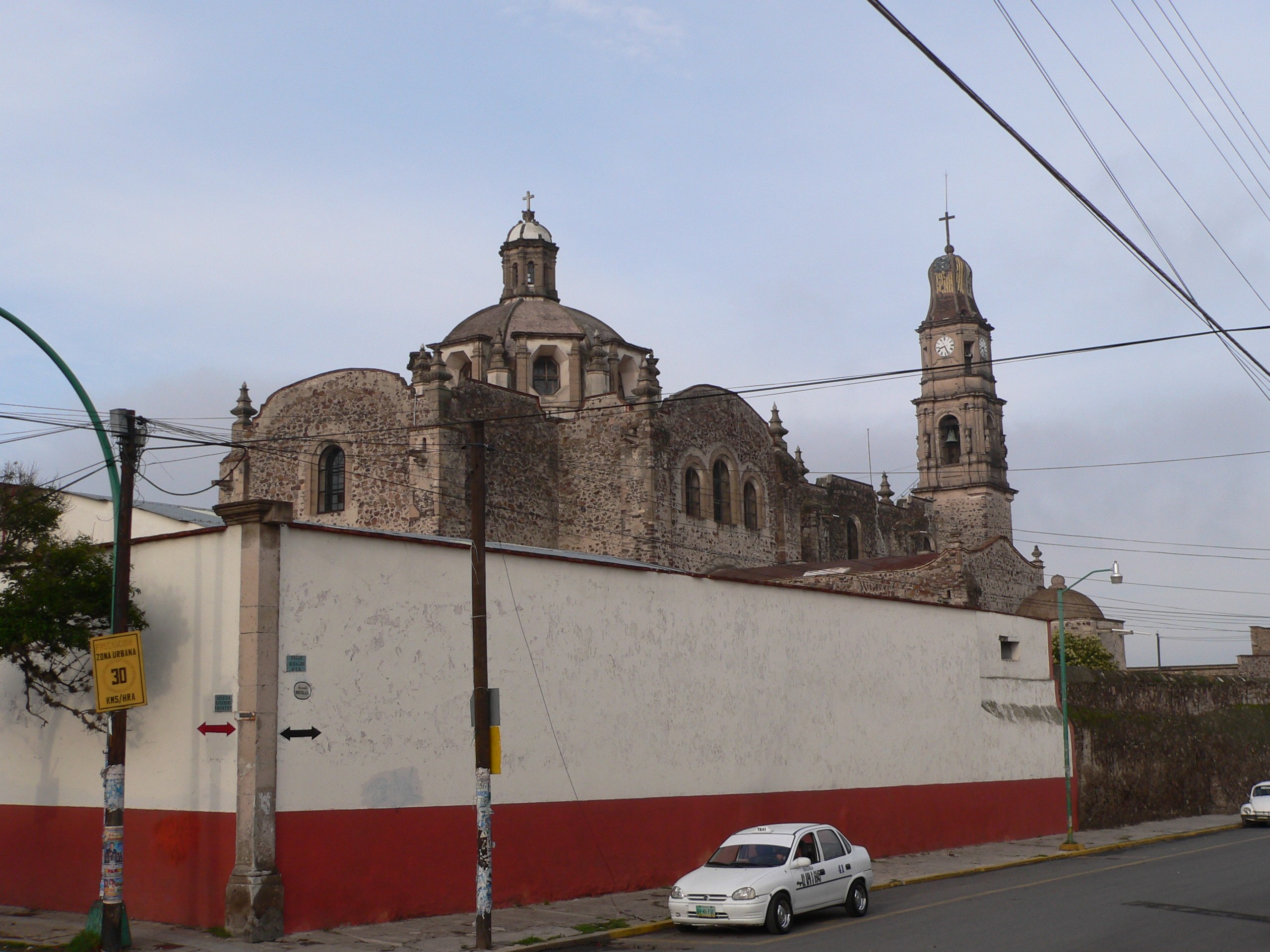
Church

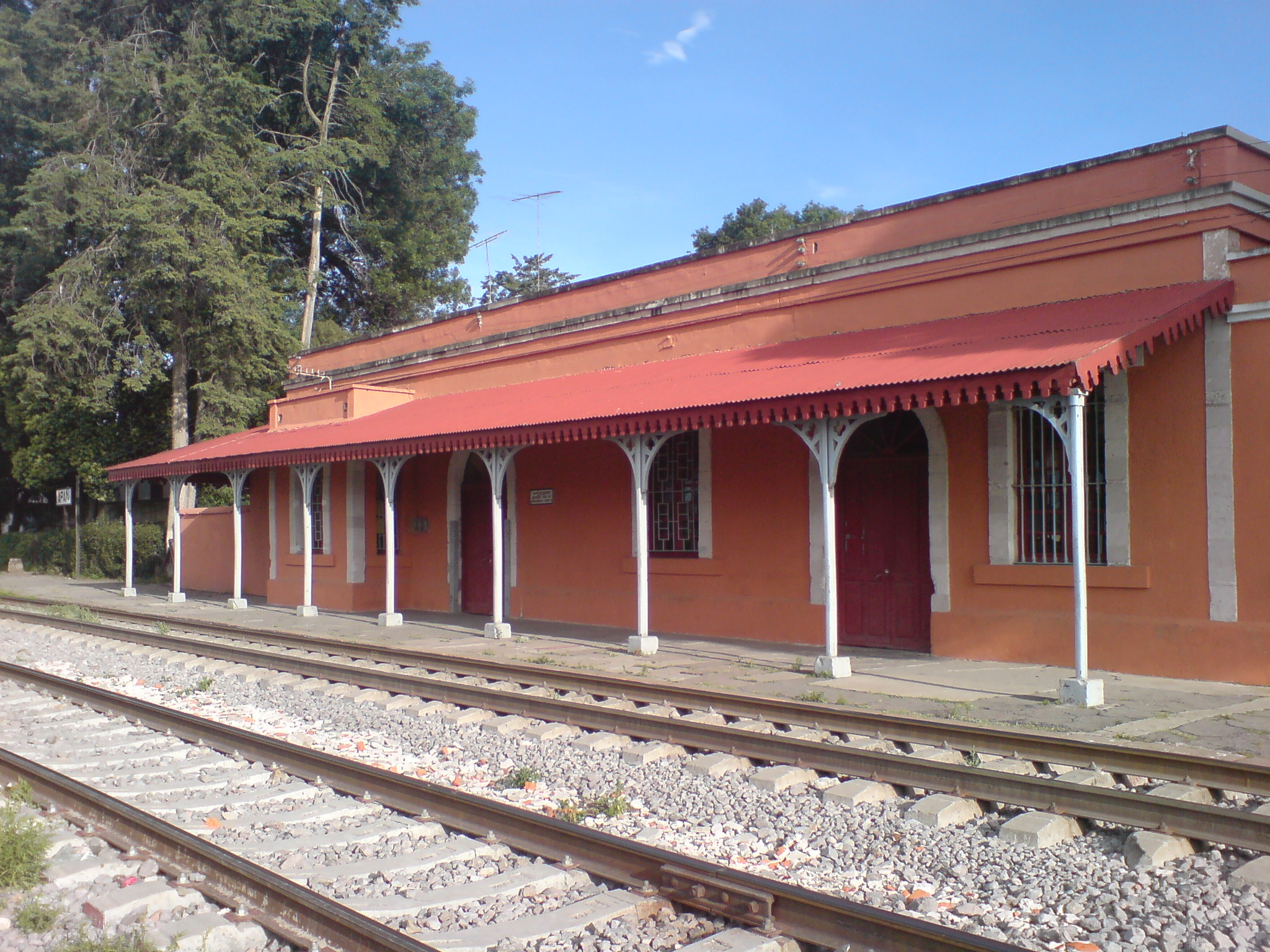
Railway station
