= Valle de los Cirios =

Coordinates: 30.0300°N 115.1700°W

Valle de los Cirios Flora and Fauna Protection Area
- Área de Protección de Flora y Fauna Valle de los Cirios
- IUCN category VI (protected area with sustainable use of natural resources)
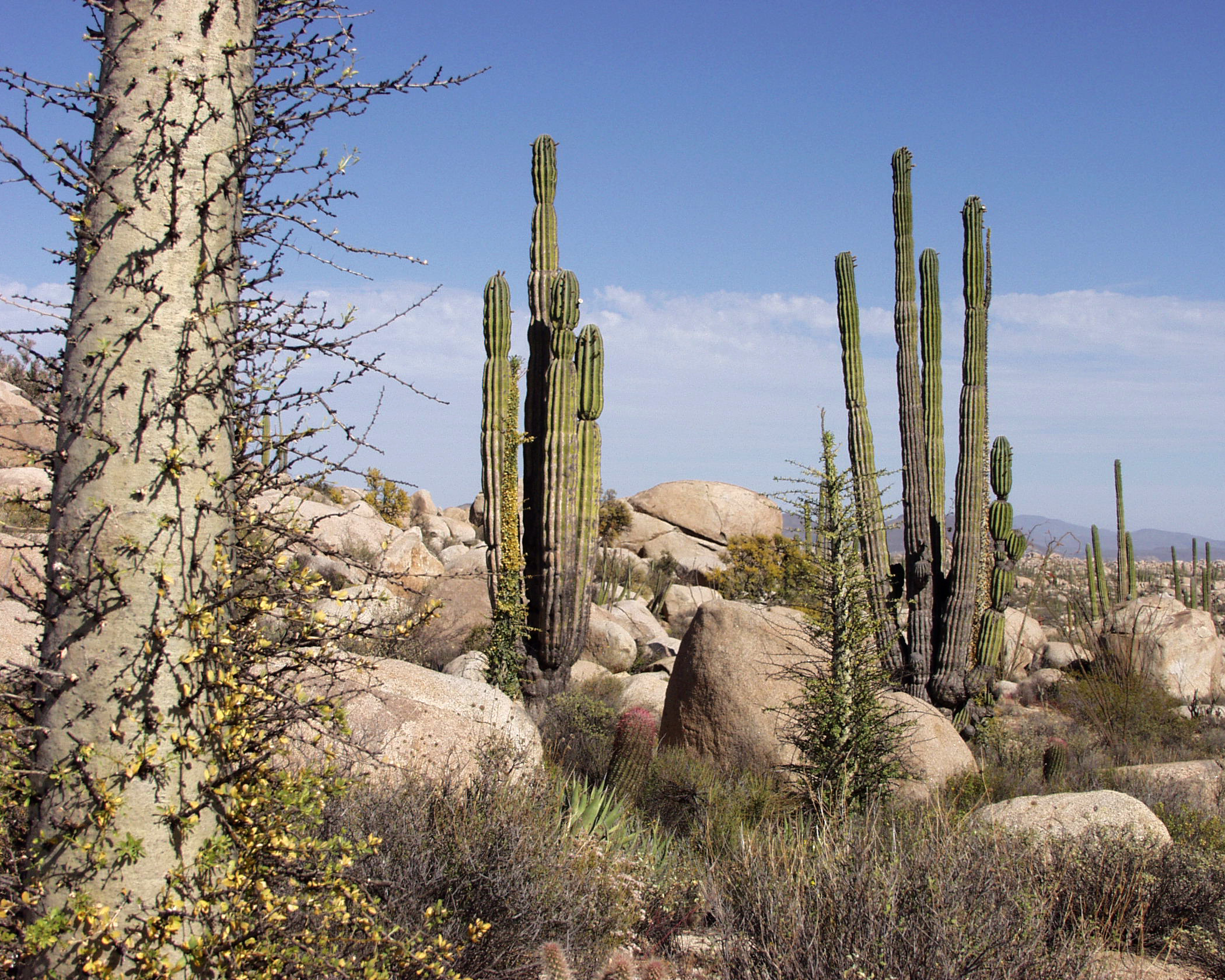
- View of Valle de los Cirios
- Interactive map of Valle de los Cirios Flora and Fauna Protection Area
- Location: Baja California, Mexico
- Area: 2,521,988 ha (9,737.45 sq mi)
- Designated: 2000
- Administrator: National Commission of Natural Protected Areas (Comisión Nacional de Áreas Naturales Protegidas – CONANP)

Valle de los Cirios ("Valley of the Candles") is a wildlife protection area in the southern portion of the municipality of Ensenada in Baja California, Mexico. At 2,521,776 hectares (9,736.63 sq mi) in area, it is the second-largest wildlife protection area behind El Vizcaíno Biosphere Reserve, but it includes more land than El Vizcaíno.

== Geography ==
Valle de los Cirios is located in central Baja California. It covers a third of the area of the state of Baja California and half the territory of Ensenada municipality. Its southern border is the state line with Baja California Sur, where it adjoins El Vizcaíno Biosphere Reserve. The two protected areas together cover more area than the state of Quintana Roo. Valle de los Cirios borders the Pacific Ocean and Gulf of California

== Ecology ==
It is characterized by scrub and desert landscapes featuring many cirio (Fouquieria columnaris) trees. The wildlife area is largely untouched and well-conserved, featuring a large number of endemic species including abundant concentrations of cacti, reptiles and large mammals.

The Peninsular Ranges extend north and south through the preserve. The western portion, between the mountains and the Pacific Ocean, is part of the Baja California desert ecoregion. The narrower eastern portion, between the mountains and the Gulf of California, is part of the Gulf of California xeric scrub ecoregion.

== Status ==
The site was declared a flora and fauna protection area on June 2, 1980. In June 2004, the Mexican government submitted Valle de los Cirios to the tentative list of sites that may become a World Heritage Site.
