= Miguel Ángel Peña Sánchez =

Mexican politician

- Born: 30 March 1953 (age 73); Hidalgo, Mexico
- Occupation: Politician
- Political party: PRD

Miguel Ángel Peña Sánchez (born 30 March 1953) is a Mexican politician affiliated with the Party of the Democratic Revolution (PRD). In 2006–2009 he served as a federal deputy in the 60th Congress, representing Hidalgo's seventh district.
