= Jorge Romero Romero =

Mexican politician (1964–2021)

- Born: 10 November 1964; Pachuca, Hidalgo, Mexico
- Died: 16 July 2021 (aged 56)
- Occupation: Politician
- Political party: PRI

Jorge Romero Romero (10 November 1964 – 16 July 2021) was a Mexican politician who was the state president of the Institutional Revolutionary Party (PRI) in Hidalgo from 1996 to 1999.

Romero served in the Chamber of Deputies on two occasions: in 2003–2006 (59th Congress), representing Hidalgo's 5th district, and in 2009–2012 (61st Congress), representing Hidalgo's 7th district.

Jorge Romero Romero died in July 2021.
