= List of World Heritage Sites in Mexico =

The United Nations Educational, Scientific and Cultural Organization (UNESCO) World Heritage Sites are places of importance to cultural or natural heritage as described in the UNESCO World Heritage Convention, established in 1972. Cultural heritage consists of monuments (such as architectural works, monumental sculptures, or inscriptions), groups of buildings, and sites (including archaeological sites). Natural features (consisting of physical and biological formations), geological and physiographical formations (including habitats of threatened species of animals and plants), and natural sites which are important from the point of view of science, conservation or natural beauty, are defined as natural heritage. Mexico adhered to the convention on 23 February 1984, making its historical sites eligible for inclusion on the list. Mexico has 36 sites on the list (the highest number of sites per country in the Americas) and a further 23 tentative sites.

Mexico's first six sites were inscribed on the list at the 11th Session of the World Heritage Committee, held at UNESCO headquarters in Paris in 1987. The most recent inscription was the Wixárika Route through Sacred Sites to Wirikuta, listed in 2025. There are 28 cultural, six natural, and two sites listed both for their cultural and natural significance. The Islands and Protected Areas of the Gulf of California site has been listed as endangered because of the imminent extinction of the vaquita, an endemic porpoise in the gulf.

Location of World Heritage Sites within Mexico. Red dots indicate cultural, green dots are natural, and blue dots are mixed sites. Empty circles are the sites of the Camino Real de Tierra Adentro. Numbers indicate the following sites: 1. Downtown Mexico City and Xochimilco; 2. Central campus of the University City of UNAM; 3. Monasteries on the slopes of Popocatépetl; 4. Luis Barragán House and Studio; 5. Aqueduct of Padre Tembleque; 6. San Miguel de Allende. The Wixárika Route sites are not shown.

== World Heritage Sites ==
UNESCO lists sites under ten criteria; each entry must meet at least one of the criteria. Criteria i through vi are cultural, and vii through x are natural.

† In danger

World Heritage Sites
Site	Image	Location (state)	Year listed	UNESCO data	Description
Sian Ka'an	Aerial look at the coast with lush vegetation	Quintana Roo	1987	410; vii, x (natural)	The biosphere reserve covers around 120 km (75 mi) of the coast of the Yucatán Peninsula, protecting both terrestrial and marine ecosystems. The area is rich in biodiversity, with habitats such as mangroves, tropical forests, marshes, and sea with a coral reef. It is home to the jaguar, cougar, Baird's tapir, and West Indian manatee. Geographical features include cenotes (sinkholes) and petenes, tree islands emerging from the swamps.
Pre-Hispanic City and National Park of Palenque	A Mayan stone pyramid complex with tourists in front	Chiapas	1987	411; i, ii, iii, iv (cultural)	Palenque was a Maya city, founded around the 1st century CE during the late Preclassic period. It reached its peak and was a powerful regional capital between c. 500 and c. 700 CE, during the Classic period. It was abandoned around the 9th century and got covered by the jungle, which helped preserving the remains until systematic explorations started in the 18th century. Palenque is renowned for its fine arts and architecture, with elegant structures and sophisticated decorations. Sculpted reliefs inside temples and palaces illustrate the mythology and rituals of the Maya. The city had an important cultural influence on the wider region.
Historic Centre of Mexico City and Xochimilco	A large cathedral building and some people walking in front	Mexico City	1987	412; ii, iii, iv, v (cultural)	Mexico City was built on the ruins of Tenochtitlan, the Aztec capital, that was founded in the 14th century. There are remains of Aztec buildings, including the main temple, Templo Mayor. As the capital of New Spain until the 19th century, the city has numerous colonial buildings, including the Cathedral (pictured) and several churches, as well as streets in a grid plan and numerous plazas. The Palacio de Bellas Artes is a prominent example of the late 19th century architecture. Xochimilco, located in the suburbs, is the only remainder of traditional land use on the Lake Xochimilco.
Pre-Hispanic City of Teotihuacan	A large pyramid with tourists in front	State of Mexico	1987	414; i, ii, iii, iv (cultural)	Teotihuacan was the capital of the first classic civilization of Mesoamerica. The city reached its peak between the 1st and 7th century CE when it was home to at least 25,000 inhabitants, making it one of the largest pre-Columbian cities. Its cultural and political influence extended over a vast area, as far as to the Yucatán Peninsula and Guatemala. Monuments of the city include the Pyramid of the Sun (pictured), Pyramid of the Moon, Avenue of the Dead, several other pyramids, and remains of palaces. The city was destroyed and abandoned c. 650, but still remained in collective memory, being sacred to the Aztec.
Historic Centre of Oaxaca and Archaeological site of Monte Albán	Pyramid complex	Oaxaca	1987	415; i, ii, iii, iv (cultural)	Monte Albán is the main archaeological site of the Oaxaca Valley which flourished from c. 500 BCE under the Olmecs, Zapotecs, and Mixtecs. The successive cultures created terraces, dams, pyramids (pictured), and artificial mounds. There is a ballgame court. After c. 850 CE, the site gradually became abandoned. The city of Oaxaca, located nearby and founded in 1529, is a good example of a 16th-century Spanish colonial town planning. It is built on a grid plan.
Historic Centre of Puebla	Interior and ceiling of the Puebla Cathedral.	Puebla	1987	416; ii, iv (cultural)	The city of Puebla was founded by the Spanish in 1531 on an important trade route connecting Mexico City and the port of Veracruz, on the foot of the Popocatepetl volcano. The city has a Renaissance grid plan and has preserved numerous monumental Baroque buildings, including the cathedral (pictured), the Convent Church of San Francisco, the Biblioteca Palafoxiana, and the buildings of the university. The architectural style reflects the fusion of European and indigenous influences. Several historical houses are covered with ceramic tiles (azulejos).
Historic Town of Guanajuato and Adjacent Mines	Square in Guanajuato surrounded by historic buildings: a Neoclassical Theatre, part of a Baroque Church, etc.	Guanajuato	1988	482; ii, iv (cultural)	The city of Guanajuato was founded by the Spanish in the early 16th century. In the 18th century, its mines became the world's leading producers of silver. There are numerous Baroque and Neoclassical buildings in the city, with La Valenciana (pictured) and La Compañía churches being among the most beautiful examples of Baroque architecture in Central and South America.
Pre-Hispanic City of Chichen-Itza	A Mayan pyramid with staircases leading to the cubic structure on the top	Yucatán	1988	483; i, ii, iii (cultural)	Chichen Itza was one of the largest and most important Maya city. It was founded in the 5th century, rose to regional prominence in the 10th century and declined after 1440. There are numerous monuments from different periods in the city, some later ones show the influence of Toltec styles. Monuments include El Castillo (pictured), the Great ballcourt, a tzompantli (a skull wall), the Jaguar Temple, the House of Eagles, and several other temples.
Historic Centre of Morelia	A street with historic buildings on both side, including a Baroque cathedral	Michoacán	1991	585; ii, iv, vi (cultural)	Morelia, founded as Valladolid in the 16th century by the Spanish, is an outstanding example of the Spanish Renaissance urban planning with indigenous influences. The city has a grid plan and more than 200 historical buildings that mostly date to the 17th and 18th centuries, in the Renaissance, Baroque, and Neoclassical styles. In the early 19th century, the city was one of the centres of the Mexican War of Independence, with two priests from the city playing an important role: Miguel Hidalgo and José María Morelos. In 1828, the city was renamed as Morelia after the latter.
El Tajín, Pre-Hispanic City	Stone pyramids with decorated sides	Veracruz	1992	631; i, ii, iv (cultural)	El Tajín was the centre of the Classic Veracruz culture, probably of the Huastec or Totonac and was at its height from the early 9th to the early 13th century, when it was abandoned and partially destroyed. The architecture of the city is unique in Mesoamerica. The characteristic features are buildings with richly decorated parts, one of the recurring motifs being xicalcoliuhqui (step fret, at the cross section of a marine shell). Interestingly, the city had a large number of ballcourts, 17. There are remains of several residential buildings, altars, temples, and public buildings. The Pyramid of the Niches is pictured.
Rock Paintings of the Sierra de San Francisco	Rock paintings replica depicting humans and deer	Baja California Sur	1993	714; i, iii (cultural)	One of the largest assemblies of rock paintings in the world was created by a culture that developed on the Baja California peninsula relatively isolated from continental influences between c. 100 BCE and c. 1300 CE. The culture disappeared rapidly after the European contact. Paintings depict human and animal figures and are painted in red, black, white, and yellow. Due to relative inaccessibility of the sites and the dry climate of the region, they have been well preserved. A museum replica is pictured.
Whale Sanctuary of El Vizcaino	Adult grey whale and a calf	Baja California Sur	1993	554; x (natural)	The protected area comprises two coastal lagoons and their surroundings with mangroves, marshes, and desert habitats. The lagoons are the most important breeding grounds of the eastern subpopulation of the North Pacific grey whale (two whales pictured) and are home to other marine mammals, such as the bottlenose dolphin, harbor seal, and California sea lion. It is also home to four endangered sea turtle species and an important wintering area for migratory birds.
Historic Centre of Zacatecas	Side view of a cathedral with a dome and two decorated Baroque bell towers	Zacatecas	1993	676; ii, iv (cultural)	Zacatecas, founded in 1546, was one of the centres of silver mining in Mexico until the 20th century. It reached its peak of prosperity in the 16th and 17th centuries. It was also a centre for evangelization and cultural expansion. There are numerous religious complexes from the 17th and 18th centuries, including the cathedral (pictured) with a highly decorated Baroque facade. The religious iconography shows influences of indigenous traditions on Catholic ones. The historic centre has a well preserved layout. It demonstrates a colonial settlement well adapted to the mountain topography of the region.
Earliest 16th-Century Monasteries on the Slopes of Popocatepetl	A monastery building surrounded by trees	Morelos, Puebla, Tlaxcala	1994	702bis; ii, iv (cultural)	This site comprises 15 monasteries (one of which, Tlaxcala Cathedral, was added in 2021) on the slopes of the Popocatepetl volcano. They were constructed by the Spanish in order to help with colonization and evangelization of northern Mexico. The monasteries, which are in an excellent state of preservation, contain elements of the Renaissance and Mudéjar architecture with indigenous influences and several of them have a military aspect. The monasteries also introduced novel concepts with the use of wide open spaces. The style was influential in the wider region. The Convent of San Mateo in Atlatlahucan is pictured.
Historic Monuments Zone of Querétaro	Courtyard with two levels of arches with rich decorations	Querétaro	1996	792; ii, iv (cultural)	Querétaro was founded on the border between the southern part of Mexico, gradually settled by the Spanish, and the northern part of the country, inhabited by hostile nomadic groups such as the Chichimeca. A characteristic feature of the city is that it was designed in two parts, one with wide grid plan for the Spanish and the one with narrow winding streets for the indigenous communities. The city has several Baroque monuments from the 17th and 18th centuries. The Convent of San Agustin, with its poly-lobed arches and rich decorations, is pictured.
Pre-Hispanic Town of Uxmal	A Mayan pyramid in the back, a structure with columns in front	Yucatán	1996	791; i, ii, iii (cultural)	The Maya city of Uxmal and nearby sites Kabah, Labna, and Sayil represent the high points of late Mayan art and architecture. Uxmal was founded in c. 700 CE and rose to an important regional centre with more than 20,000 inhabitants. It was abandoned after the 10th century. The city plan was influenced by the knowledge of astronomy, such as the cycles of Venus. The Pyramid of the Magician is pictured.
Hospicio Cabañas, Guadalajara	A courtyard with arches and a circular chapel behind	Jalisco	1997	815; i, ii, iii, iv (cultural)	The Hospicio Cabañas was founded in the late 19th century by Bishop Cabañas as an institution of public welfare to provide care for disadvantaged groups, such as the orphans, the elderly, and the disabled. The Neoclassical complex was designed by the architect Manuel Tolsá as an assembly of uniform single-storey buildings with numerous arcades and open spaces. The murals of José Clemente Orozco from the late 1930s in the chapel are one of the masterpieces of Mexican art.
Historic Monuments Zone of Tlacotalpan	River Papaloapan with a series of brightly painted houses with arcades in the background	Veracruz	1998	862; ii, iv (cultural)	Tlacotalpan was founded by the Spanish in the mid-16th century as a river port near the Gulf of Mexico. It reached its peak in the 19th century. The historic centre, which has been well preserved, reflects a fusion of the Spanish and Caribbean influences, with brightly coloured and highly decorated houses.
Archaeological Zone of Paquimé, Casas Grandes	Ruins of adobe buildings	Chihuahua	1998	560rev; iii, iv (cultural)	Casas Grandes is an archaeological site of a culture that reached its peak in the 14th and 15th centuries and disappeared after the Spanish conquest. They played an important role in the connections between the Ancestral Puebloans in the north and the more advanced civilizations in the south. The remains include adobe and earthen buildings, some of which were several stories high, and ceremonial monuments.
Historic Fortified Town of Campeche	Street view with brightly coloured houses and fortified wall.	Campeche	1999	895; ii, iv (cultural)	The town of Campeche was founded in the 16th century by the Spanish and served as an important centre for colonization and evangelization of the Yucatan Peninsula and nearby regions. It got its fortifications in the 17th and early 18th centuries to protect it from the pirate attacks. The town has a grid plan and numerous historic buildings in the Renaissance, Baroque, and eclectic styles.
Archaeological Monuments Zone of Xochicalco	A stone temple with side walls decorated with stone carvings in Mesoamerican style	Morelos	1999	939; iii, iv (cultural)	The city of Xochicalco was founded in the second half of the 7th century and is an exceptionally well preserved example of a fortified regional centre from the period that was marked by the collapse of several important political entities, such as Teotihuacan, Monte Albán, Palenque, and Tikal. The architecture of the city reflects the fusion of different art styles of the region, as a result of intense cultural regrouping of the period. The city was sacked in the 9th century and consequently abandoned. The Temple of the Feathered Serpent is pictured.
Ancient Maya City and Protected Tropical Forests of Calakmul, Campeche	A Mayan temple obstructed by tropical forest	Campeche	2002	1061bis; i, ii, iii, iv, ix, x (mixed)	Calakmul was an important Maya city, settled in the middle of the first millennium BCE, reaching its peak in the Late Classic period (c. 600-900 CE) as the seat of the influential Kaan dynasty. During the classic Maya collapse in the 10th century, the city was almost completely abandoned and has been virtually uninhabited since. There are remains of numerous monumental buildings, including temples and pyramids, some decorated with stucco friezes and mural paintings. There are also remains of several smaller settlements in the area. Originally listed for its cultural significance under the name The Ancient Maya City of Calakmul, Campeche, the site was extended in 2014 to include it natural significance. The tropical rainforests are rich in biodiversity and home to numerous endemic and threatened species. Parts of the forests have been shaped by traditional management practices by the indigenous communities of the region.
Franciscan Missions in the Sierra Gorda of Querétaro	A church building with richly decorated facade. A metal cross in front.	Querétaro	2003	1079; ii, iii (cultural)	This site comprises five Franciscan missions that were founded in the mid-18th century in the Sierra Gorda. The aim of the missions was to continue evangelization of central and northern Mexico and of what is now the western United States. The monasteries have richly decorated facades which reflect the fusion of Catholic and indigenous influences. The Santiago de Jalpan mission in Jalpan de Serra is pictured.
Luis Barragán House and Studio	Interior of a modernist house with stairs and purple-painted wall	Mexico City	2004	1136; i, ii (cultural)	The House and Studio of influential Mexican architect Luis Barragán was constructed in 1948. An example of modern architecture, the concrete three-storey building with a small private garden integrates elements of modern design with vernacular elements of Mexico. The use of water and fountains was inspired by traditions from Morocco. Barragán's work was influential in the designs of gardens, plazas, and landscapes.
Islands and Protected Areas of the Gulf of California†	Sea lions on the rocks	Baja California, Baja California Sur, Sonora, Sinaloa, Nayarit	2005	1182ter; vii, ix, x (natural)	The property comprises islands, islets, coasts, and marine environments of the Gulf of California. Terrestrial habitats are rich with desert plants, such as cacti, and have numerous resident or migratory bird species. Nutrient-rich waters support a thriving marine ecosystem. There are around 900 species of fish with 90 endemic species. A third of world's marine cetacean species are present in the Gulf. Minor modifications of site boundaries took place in 2007 and 2011. Since 2019, the site has been listed as endangered because of the imminent extinction of the vaquita, an endemic porpoise.
Agave Landscape and Ancient Industrial Facilities of Tequila	Extensive fields of blue agave in rows	Jalisco	2006	1209; ii, iv, v, vi (cultural)	Blue agave has been cultivated in the region for at least two millennia to produce fermented drinks and fiber for cloth, for example by the Teuchitlán culture from c. 200 to c. 900 CE, and since the 16th century to produce tequila. Since the 17th century, production took place on the industrial scale. The cultural landscape comprises agave fields, urban settlements, and distilleries. There are also remains of ceremonial mounds and ballcourts from the Teuchitlán culture.
Central University City Campus of the Universidad Nacional Autónoma de México (UNAM)	University buildings with stone details and paintings inspired by pre-Columbian civilizations	Mexico City	2007	1250; i, ii, iv (cultural)	The UNAM campus was constructed between 1949 and 1952. The design of the buildings, urban plan, and landscape design follow the principles of modern architecture. A prominent feature are the artworks which often reference pre-Columbian traditions of Mexico. The Central Library building is pictured.
Monarch Butterfly Biosphere Reserve	Fir trees with butterflies flying around	Michoacán, State of Mexico	2008	1290; vii (natural)	Every year, millions of monarch butterflies migrate between Mexico and as far as eastern Canada, during which time four successive generations are born and die. This site comprises an estimated half of the areas where the monarchs spend the winter in close-packed clusters on oyamel trees. Massive gathering of butterflies is one of the most dramatic manifestations of insect migrations.
Protective town of San Miguel de Allende and the Sanctuary of Jesús Nazareno de Atotonilco	A view of a town from above, with a prominent Baroque church	Guanajuato	2008	1274; ii, iv (cultural)	The town of San Miguel de Allende (pictured) was established in the 16th century to protect the Camino Real de Tierra Adentro. It has numerous religious and civic buildings from the 18th century, in the Mexican Baroque style. Some buildings show transition to the neoclassical style. Urban buildings are unusually large and rich for a medium-size town. The nearby Jesuit sanctuary from the 18th century is another prominent example of Mexican Baroque. Both sites demonstrate the interactions of European and indigenous cultures.
Camino Real de Tierra Adentro	A city with a church and a park in front	several sites	2010	1351; ii, iv (cultural)	Camino Real, or the Royal Inland Route, was a trade route for silver extracted from the mines in Mexico and mercury imported from Europe. It was active from the mid-16th to the 19th centuries and stretched over 2,600 km (1,600 mi) from north of Mexico City to Santa Fe in today's New Mexico. This serial site comprises the Mexican part of the route, in the length of 1,400 km (870 mi), with an ensemble of 59 properties, such as mines, towns, former convents, bridges, and former haciendas. Five sites on the route are listed as independent World Heritage Sites. The city of Durango is pictured.
Prehistoric Caves of Yagul and Mitla in the Central Valley of Oaxaca		Oaxaca	2010	1352; iii (cultural)	The two archaeological sites in the central Oaxaca Valley include pre-Columbian complexes, as well as caves and rock shelters that have been inhabited at least ten millennia ago. The finds in caves, such as the Guilá Naquitz Cave (entrance pictured), demonstrate the transition of hunter-gatherer societies to farmers, with some of the earliest evidence of squash and maize domestication. There is also rock art and remains of stone tools.
El Pinacate and Gran Desierto de Altar Biosphere Reserve	A sandy dune with a tourist walking by and mountains in the background	Sonora	2013	1410; vii, viii, x (natural)	The reserve is located in the Sonoran Desert. The Pinacate Shield has numerous volcanic features, the most prominent being ten maar (steam blast) volcanic craters that are almost perfectly circular. There are lava flows, cinder cones, and lava tubes. The Gran Altar Desert has large dunes and granite massifs that result in a visually striking landscape. The seemingly inhospitable area with a mosaic of different environments is nevertheless rich in animal and plant species, with more than 500 species of plants. Animals include the endangered Sonoran pronghorn and the lesser long-nosed bat.
Aqueduct of Padre Tembleque Hydraulic System	An aqueduct crossing dry landscape	State of Mexico, Hidalgo	2015	1463; i, ii, iv (cultural)	The hydraulic system was constructed by Franciscan friars between 1555 and 1572. It stretches over 48 km (30 mi) and comprises springs, canals, reservoirs, and aqueducts. The main aqueduct (pictured) reaches almost 40 m (130 ft) in height. The construction demonstrates the technology exchange between the European and indigenous cultures. While the design of the hydraulic system originates from the Roman and Arab-Andalusian traditions, local adobe formwork was used as an alternative to wooden scaffolding.
Revillagigedo Archipelago	A look at an island with some clouds from above	Colima	2016	1510; vii, ix, x (natural)	The archipelago, part of a submerged mountain range in the eastern Pacific Ocean, comprises four volcanic islands and their surrounding waters. Nutrient-rich waters support marine life with large populations of sharks, giant manta rays, whales, and marine turtles. The islands are also important for seabirds and are the wintering area for large groups of humpback whales. Each of the islands has a particular flora and fauna with several endemic species or subspecies, including four endemic species of birds. Socorro Island is pictured.
Tehuacán-Cuicatlán Valley: originary habitat of Mesoamerica	Landscape with large cacti on a slope	Puebla, Oaxaca	2018	1534rev; iv, x (mixed)	The Tehuacán-Cuicatlán Valley is exceptionally rich in biodiversity in an arid and semi-arid setting. It is one of the main areas for diversification of cacti. There are large assemblies of columnar cacti and numerous Agave, Yucca, and bromeliad species. It is also home for several endangered bird and amphibian species, and crucial for their conservation. Archaeological investigations have uncovered traces of human habitation for over 12,000 years, with water managements systems and plant domestication, as well as pottery and salt production.
Wixárika Route through Sacred Sites to Wirikuta (Tatehuarí Huajuyé)	People in traditional dresses walking across a plain	several sites	2025	1704; iii, vi (cultural)	Pilgrimages to sacred sites are one of the key features of the culture of the Huichol people. These sites spread over 800 km (500 mi) between the Pacific coast and the Gulf of Mexico and follow the pre-Hispanic trade routes. The pilgrimages are important in preserving the culture of the Huichol. The routes cross the Chihuahuan Desert and the Sierra Madre Occidental mountain range, known for their biodiversity.

== Tentative list ==
In addition to sites inscribed on the World Heritage list, member states can maintain a list of tentative sites that they may consider for nomination. Nominations for the World Heritage list are only accepted if the site was previously listed on the tentative list. Mexico maintains 23 properties on its tentative list:

Tentative sites
Site	Image	Location (state)	Year listed	UNESCO criteria	Description
Chapultepec Woods, Hill and Castle	A castle on a hill, surrounded by a forest	Mexico City	2001	i, iii, iv, vi (cultural)	Chapultepec Hill was a sacred place to the Aztec. The neoclassical castle (pictured) was built by the Spanish as a residence for the viceroy. It also served as a residence of the presidents and was repurposed as the Museo Nacional de Historia in 1940. The surrounding forests are an important green area in Mexico City and are used for recreational activities.
Historic Town of Alamos	A look at a town from above. Several buildings with arcades visible.	Sonora	2001	iv, vi (cultural)	The town of Álamos, founded by the Spanish, has two main plazas. There are many historic buildings. Those from the 17th and 18th centuries have arcades on the street side. Buildings from later periods are harmoniously integrated into the city fabric.
Church of Santa Prisca and its Surroundings	City panorama with a prominent church	Guerrero	2001	i, iv, vi (cultural)	The mid-18th century church was commissioned by José de la Borda, the owner of prosperous mines. The building is in the Churrigueresque style, an elaborate form of Baroque, and features numerous works of art. Several contemporary buildings around the church create a picturesque setting.
Pre-Hispanic City of Cantona	Archaeological site with several terraces	Puebla	2001	iii, iv (cultural)	The city of Cantona reached its peak between c. 550 - 950 CE when it was a large fortified city with nearly 8000 residential units. Located in a badlands environment, the buildings are specific in a way that no mortar or cement was used in construction. It had 24 ballcourts, the largest number recorded per individual site in Mexico.
Great City of Chicomostoc-La Quemada	A Mezoamerican pyramid ruins	Zacatecas	2001	i, iv (cultural)	Chicomostoc-La Quemada is an archaeological site, comprising the remains of a city that was built c. 400-900 CE. It has a large ballcourt, several terraces, an observatory, and a pyramid.
Historic Town of San Sebastián del Oeste	Look at an abandoned town from above	Jalisco	2001	iii, iv, v, ix, x (mixed)	One of the main silver and gold mining centres of the New Spain was founded in the early 17th century when ore deposits were discovered. There were almost 30 mines in the area, as well as several foundries. After the closing of the last mine in 1921, the town became abandoned. The nomination also mentions an important interplay between the urban setting and its natural environment.
Diego Rivera and Frida Kahlo's Home-Study Museum	A structure in the shape of a pyramid with bright colours	Mexico City	2001	i, iv, vi (cultural)	This nomination comprises three buildings of the home of the artist couple Frida Kahlo and Diego Rivera who lived here in the 1930s, and Frida's father Guillermo Kahlo. The complex was designed by the architect Juan O'Gorman who paid particular attention to the natural light in the painter's study. It is a prominent example of modern architecture.
Valle de los Cirios	Desert landscape with large cacti	Baja California	2004	(natural)	The area is an important wildlife reserve, with amphibians, reptiles, birds, and mammals. It is a desert with sparse water sources. The vegetation is similar to that of the Sonoran Desert, with some local Californian species also present.
Flora and Fauna Protection Area of Cuatro Ciénegas	A palm and some shrubs in white sands, a body of water in the background	Coahuila	2004	(natural)	Located at an elevation of 740 m (2,430 ft) and surrounded by mountains, the area has numerous springs, rivers, marshes, and lagoons. It is an important wetland and home to several endemic species that have evolved in isolation. There are gypsum dunes that support xerophillic plants.
Historical Town The Royal of the Eleven Thousand Virgins of Cosala in Sinaloa	A town scene with a church and with houses painted pink and green	Sinaloa	2004	ii, iv (cultural)	Cosalá was founded in 1562 by the Spanish to support silver mining in the region. Its peak was in the 19th century. The town has a historic centre with an irregular plan due to the topography. There are several historic buildings in adobe with arched patios.
Lacan-Tún – Usumacinta Region	River canyon surrounded by tropical forests	Chiapas	2004	(mixed)	The area has montane rainforests, flooded forests, and river valleys and gorges (Usumacinta River pictured). It is rich in biodiversity, especially in bird, butterfly, and beetle species. There are several archaeological sites of the Maya civilization in the jungle, including Yaxchilan and Bonampak.
Banco Chinchorro Biosphere Reserve	Tropical island with a lighthouse	Quintana Roo	2004	i, ii, iii, iv, vii, viii, ix, x (mixed)	Banco Chinchorro is a coral reef system located around 30 km (19 mi) off the mainland in the Caribbean Sea. It has a wide variety of marine and terrestrial habitats and is rich in flora and fauna. The area is also of archaeological interest because of numerous shipwrecks, dating from the 16th to 20th centuries.
Tecoaque	Archaeological site with remains of walls and terraces	Tlaxcala	2004	ii, iii, iv (cultural)	The archaeological site has buildings from c. 1400 CE, including a temple dedicated to Ehecatl. The site is important in the history of early contacts between the Spanish and the Aztec Empire. Between 1520 and 1521, the locals captured a caravan of Spanish, Africans, mulattos, Taínos, and mestizos traveling to Tenochtitlan, and ritually sacrificed them. They also captured European domestic animals travelling with them. The archaeological record of the events was found on the site.
Cuetzalan and its Historical, Cultural and Natural Surrounding	A church, some buildings and palm trees	Puebla	2006	iii, iv, v, viii, ix (mixed)	The city was founded on the site of pre-Hispanic settlement from c. 600-900 CE. It demonstrates a mixture of indigenous and European influences, with numerous traditions and rituals. The surroundings have lush semitropical vegetation and waterfalls.
Historical city of Izamal (Izamal, Mayan continuity in an Historical City)	A street with yellow-painted houses	Yucatán	2008	iii, iv, vi (cultural)	Izamal was an important city of the Maya civilization and probably the largest city of the northern Yucatan Peninsula. It was founded c. 800-600 BCE and was partially abandoned c. 800-1000 CE. Several pre-Hispanic structures have been preserved. The city was an important ceremonial centre. The Spanish founded a new city on the site, which also became of religious significance, attracting pilgrims. The area is still inhabited by the Maya peoples, who preserve various traditions.
Los Petenes-Ría Celestún	Mangroves around a river channel	Campeche, Yucatán	2008	ix, x (natural)	The reserve protects an extensive mangrove wetland, known as the Petenes mangroves ecoregion. This ecosystem developed around underground aquifers in otherwise dry tropical area. The reserve is home to large and diverse populations of migratory and resident birds, with over 300 species identified. It is also home to the West Indian manatee, four species of turtles and two species of crocodiles.
Las Pozas, Xilitla	Sculptures in a tropical garden	San Luis Potosí	2009	i, iii (cultural)	Las Pozas is an ensemble of structures created by the wealthy poet Edward James, an important figure and patron of the surrealist movement. Work on the park spanned from 1944 to 1984. Large concrete constructions have no practical function but are there for aesthetic purpose.
El Arco del Tiempo del Río La Venta	A woman standing in front of a waterfall	Chiapas	2010	iii, vii, viii, x (mixed)	La Venta River that crosses a karst landscape has created a large canyon with a depth of up to 500 m (1,600 ft) and the highest natural arch in the world, 158 m (518 ft) high. There are numerous caves in the area, some of which provide archaeological evidence of communities living here 10,000 to 5,000 years ago, with remains of domesticated plants, baskets, woodworks, and burials. Caves are home to a diverse troglofauna, including fish, crayfish, and prawns, many of which were first described here. El Aguacero cascade is pictured.
Ring of cenotes of Chicxulub Crater, Yucatan	A sinkhole with some tree roots growing down	Yucatán	2012	vii (natural)	This nomination comprises 99 cenotes, or sinkholes, that formed on the rim of the Chicxulub crater. The crater, with a diameter of 180 km (110 mi), formed following the meteorite impact that was the main reason for the Cretaceous–Paleogene extinction event. Several cenotes are protected as Ramsar wetlands and some are important archaeological sites. They were relevant for the Maya communities that lived in the area.
Las Labradas, Sinaloa archaeological site	Beach with rocks with geometric petroglyphs	Sinaloa	2012	iii, iv, v (cultural)	Las Labradas is an archeological site with group of basalt rocks with petroglyphs. A unique characteristic of these petroglyphs is that they are located on a beach in the tidal zone and are sometimes completely covered by the sea. Motifs include stylized human and animal figures and geometric designs. It is not known which culture created them, however, based on the style it was estimated that they were created between c. 1000 BCE and c. 300 CE.
Patzcuaro, Site of Humanistic Memory and Cultural Confluence	A church with yellow walls and stone arches	Michoacán	2023	ii, iv, vi (cultural)	Pátzcuaro was a ceremonial centre of the Purépecha Empire from the 13th century on. In the 16th century, the Spanish, under the bishop Vasco de Quiroga, developed a colonial city and a regional centre. The city was planned under the influence of ideas of Renaissance humanism to provide a home for a multi-cultural society. It is divided into two areas, one has religious and educational buildings and the other has administrative buildings and houses of wealthy locals. The Sagrarion Temple is pictured.
San Juan de Ulua, Site of Memory and Historical Resistances	A fortress on the shore	Veracruz	2022	ii, vi (cultural)	The fortress of San Juan de Ulúa, overlooking the city of Veracruz, was the key port of the Gulf of Mexico, accounting for over a third of all global transatlantic trade in the 16th and 17th centuries, connecting the Americas with Europe, China, Japan, and the Philippines. It was also an entry port for African slaves. A part of the Spanish defenses against the pirates along the American coasts, it saw several events of the Mexican War of Independence and later military conflicts.
Historic University District (extension of Historic Centre of Puebla)	]A three-storey building with a facade decorated with balconies and ceramic tiles	Puebla	2024	ii, iv, vi (cultural)	The historic centre of Puebla was listed as a World Heritage Site in 1987. The proposed extension seeks to include the University Historic Quarter (Casa de los Muñecos pictured) that functioned according to the Spanish educational model, as an example of a living tradition.

== See also ==
- List of Intangible Cultural Heritage elements in Mexico
