= 7th federal electoral district of Hidalgo =

Federal electoral district of Mexico

Hidalgo's 7th
- Electoral district of the Chamber of Deputies of Mexico

- 7th district since 2023

Incumbent
- Member: Mirna Rubio Sánchez
- Party: ▌Morena
- Congress: 66th (2024–2027)

District
- State: Hidalgo
- Head town: Tepeapulco
- Coordinates: 19°47′N 98°33′W
- Covers: 10 municipalities: Almoloya, Apan, Emiliano Zapata, Tepeapulco, Tizayuca, Tlanalapa, Tolcayuca, Villa de Tezontepec, Zapotlán de Juárez, Zempoala
- PR region: Fourth
- Precincts: 186
- Population: 424,554 (2020 census)

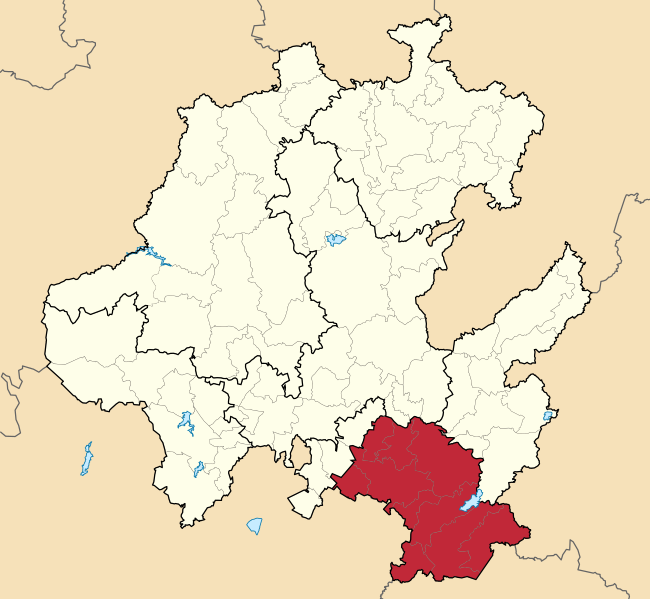
7th district in 2017–2022

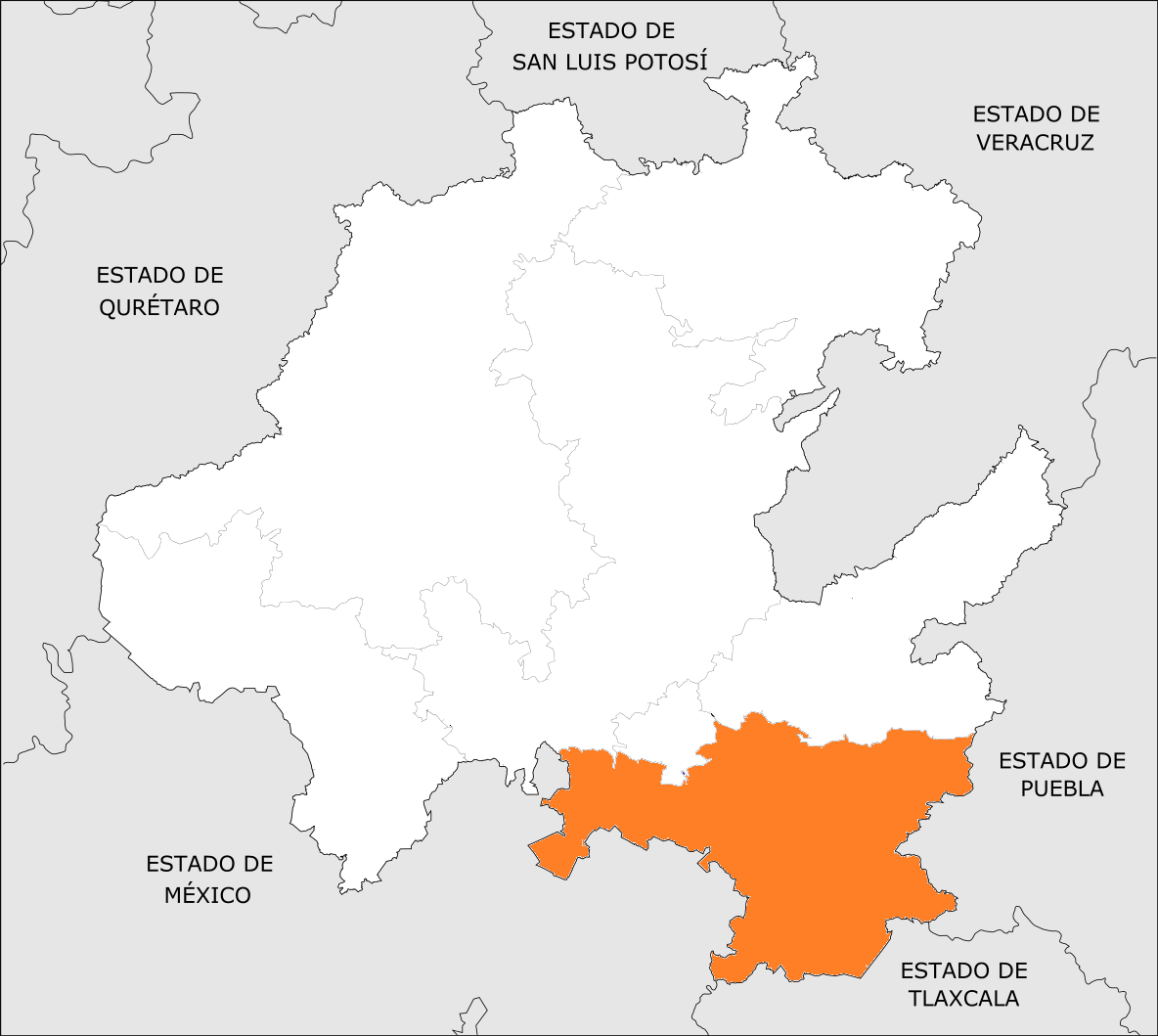
7th district in 2005–2017

The 7th federal electoral district of Hidalgo (Spanish: Distrito electoral federal 07 de Hidalgo) is one of the 300 electoral districts into which Mexico is divided for elections to the federal Chamber of Deputies and one of seven such districts in the state of Hidalgo.

It elects one deputy to the lower house of Congress for each three-year legislative period by means of the first-past-the-post system. Votes cast in the district also count towards the calculation of proportional representation ("plurinominal") deputies elected from the fourth electoral region. (Note: Between 2005 and 2023, Hidalgo was assigned to the fifth region.)

Suspended in 1943, the 7th district was re-established as part of the 1996 redistricting process. The restored district elected its first deputy in the 1997 mid-term election. The current member for the district, elected in the 2024 general election, is Mirna María de la Luz Rubio Sánchez of the National Regeneration Movement (Morena).

== District territory ==
Under the 2023 districting plan adopted by the National Electoral Institute (INE), which is to be used for the 2024, 2027 and 2030 federal elections, the 7th district covers the south-eastern portion of Hidalgo, bordering on the states of Mexico, Tlaxcala and Puebla. It comprises 186 electoral precincts (secciones electorales) across ten of the state's municipalities:

- Almoloya, Apan, Emiliano Zapata, Tepeapulco, Tizayuca, Tlanalapa, Tolcayuca, Villa de Tezontepec, Zapotlán de Juárez and Zempoala.

The head town (cabecera distrital), where results from individual polling stations are gathered together and tallied, is the city of Tepeapulco. The district reported a population of 424,554 in the 2020 census.

== Previous districting plans ==
Evolution of electoral district numbers
	1974	1978	1996	2005	2017	2023
Hidalgo	5	6	7	7	7	7
Chamber of Deputies	196	300				

2017–2022

Between 2017 and 2022, the district was located in the same general area. The head town was still Tepeapulco but it covered a slightly different group of ten municipalities:
- Almoloya, Apan, Emiliano Zapata, Epazoyucan, Mineral de la Reforma, Singuilucan, Tepeapulco, Tlanalapa, Villa de Tezontepec and Zempoala.

2005–2017

From 2005 to 2017, the district's head town was Tepeapulco and it covered 14 municipalities:
- Almoloya, Apan, Cuautepec de Hinojosa, Emiliano Zapata, Epazoyucan, Santiago Tulantepec de Lugo Guerrero, Singuilucan, Tepeapulco, Tizayuca, Tlanalapa, Tolcayuca, Villa de Tezontepec, Zapotlán de Juárez and Zempoala.

1996–2005

The 7th district was restored in the 1996 redistricting process. Still in the same region of the state and with Tepeapulco as its head town, between 1996 and 2005 the district comprised 14 municipalities:
- Almoloya, Apan, Cuautepec de Hinojosa, Emiliano Zapata, Epazoyucan, Santiago Tulantepec de Lugo Guerrero, Singuilucan, Tepeapulco, Tizayuca, Tlanalapa, Tolcayuca, Villa de Tezontepec, Zapotlán de Juárez and Zempoala.

== Deputies returned to Congress ==
(Mexico) National parties
- Current
- PAN
- PRI
- PT
- PVEM
- MC
- Morena
- PAZ
- Somos
- Defunct or local only
- PLM
- PNR
- PRM
- PNM
- PP
- PPS
- PARM
- PFCRN
- CON
- PANAL
- PSD
- PES
- PES
- PRD

Hidalgo's 7th district
Election	Deputy	Party	Legislature	Term
1916	Alfonso Cravioto		1916–1917	Constituent Congress of Querétaro
1917	Alfonso Cravioto		1917–1918	27th Congress
1918	Federico de la Colina		1918–1920	28th Congress
1920	Francisco Castrejón		1920–1922	29th Congress
1922	Norberto Aranzábal		1922–1924	30th Congress
1924	Alberto Cravioto		1924–1926	31st Congress
1926	Atanasio Hernández V.		1926–1928	32nd Congress
1928	Bartolomé Vargas Lugo		1928–1930	33rd Congress
1930	Vacant		1930–1932	34th Congress
1932	Homero Hernández Beltrán	Institutional Revolutionary Party	1932–1934	35th Congress
1934	Juvencio Nochebuena Palacios	Institutional Revolutionary Party	1934–1937	36th Congress
1937	Eduardo B. Jiménez	Institutional Revolutionary Party	1937–1940	37th Congress
1940	Juvencio Nochebuena Palacios	Institutional Revolutionary Party	1940–1943	38th Congress
The 7th district was suspended between 1943 and 1996
1997	Joel Guerrero Juárez	Institutional Revolutionary Party	1997–2000	57th Congress
2000	Omar Fayad Meneses (Note: Fayad stood down from his seat on 3 April 2003. Rodríguez Galván, his substitute, was sworn in on 8 April.); Cristóbal Rodríguez Galván	Institutional Revolutionary Party	2000–2003; 2003	58th Congress
2003	Moisés Jiménez Sánchez (Note: Originally elected on a PRI ticket, Jiménez sat as an independent after 16 March 2006.)	Institutional Revolutionary Party Independent politician	2003–2006	59th Congress
2006	Miguel Ángel Peña Sánchez	Party of the Democratic Revolution	2006–2009	60th Congress
2009	Jorge Romero Romero	Institutional Revolutionary Party	2009–2012	61st Congress
2012	Francisco González Vargas	Institutional Revolutionary Party	2012–2015	62nd Congress
2015	María Gloria Hernández Madrid	Institutional Revolutionary Party	2015–2018	63rd Congress
2018	Jannet Téllez Infante	National Regeneration Movement	2018–2021	64th Congress
2021	Navor Rojas Mancera (Note: Rojas resigned his seat in February 2022 to assume the Senate seat vacated by Julio Menchaca.); Miguel Ángel Pérez Navarrete	National Regeneration Movement	2021–2022; 2022–2024	65th Congress
2024	Mirna Rubio Sánchez	National Regeneration Movement	2024–2027	66th Congress

== Presidential elections ==
Hidalgo's 7th district
Election	District won by	Party or coalition	%
2018	Andrés Manuel López Obrador	Juntos Haremos Historia	61.0242
2024	Claudia Sheinbaum Pardo	Sigamos Haciendo Historia	65.6195
