= Tlalchiyahualica =

Township in the municipality of Yahualica, Hidalgo, Mexico

Tlalchiyahualica is a small village located in the Huasteca region of the Mexican state of Hidalgo, south of state capital Pachuca. 90% of the people in Tlalchiyahualica are Nahuas, and speak Nahuatl, a Uto-Aztecan language. All the young people and children speak Spanish.

It is a small town that has more than 3000 inhabitants. Tlalchiyahualica is a very warm place and in the month of August there are abundant rainfall . It is celebrated on Day of the Dead, Christmas, among others. It has Internet service, shops, canteens and there is an abandoned archaeological zone, which includes a pyramid. There is a lot of vegetation and fauna, it is a good place to visit during vacations; there is a river nearby. Traditional food includes: mole, zacahuil, tacos, enchiladas, quesadillas, among others. There are different churches of various religious denominations.

== See also ==
- Yahualica
