= Huitzila, Hidalgo =

Huitzila
- Locality
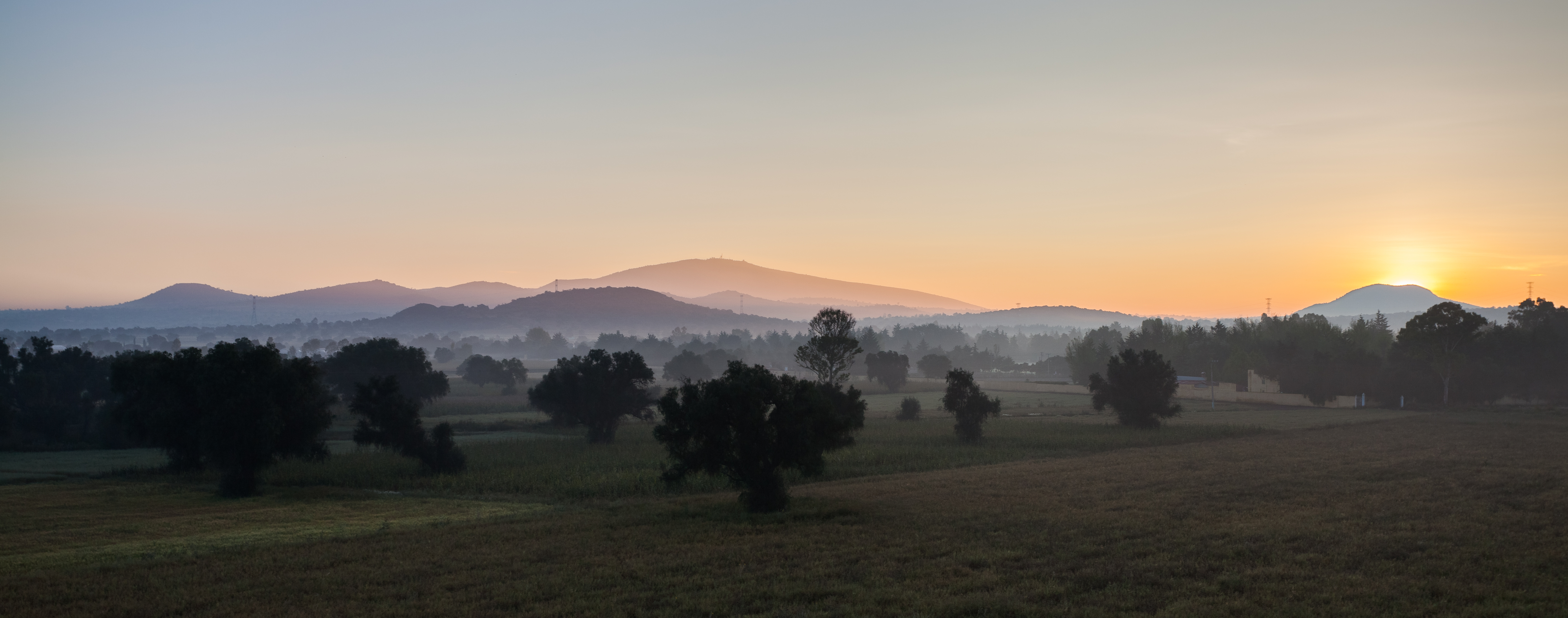
- Sunrise landscape in Huitzila

- Location of Huitzila Huitzila (Mexico)
- Coordinates: 19°48′48″N 98°57′31″W
- Country: Mexico
- State: Hidalgo
- Municipality: Tizayuca
- Elevation: 2,285 m (7,497 ft)

Population (2020)
  - Total: 5,805

Huitzila is locality in the municipality of Tizayuca, in the state of Hidalgo in central-eastern Mexico. It is located in Tizayuca Valley and is part of Greater Mexico City.

== Etymology ==
Huitzila refers to the Nahuatl term meaning: "Place among the hummingbirds".

== Geography ==
Huitzila is located in Tizayuca Valley, with the geographic coordinates at 19°48′48″N 98°57′31″W and an altitude of 2,285 m (7,497 ft). In terms of physiography, it is part of the Trans-Mexican Volcanic Belt, within the subprovince of Lagos and volcanoes of Anáhuac; its terrain includes valley and plain. With regard to hydrography, it is positioned in the Pánuco region, within the Moctezuma River basin, in the Tezontepec River sub-basin. It has a temperate semi-dry climate.

== Demographics ==
In 2020, Huitzila had a population of 5,805 people, which corresponds to 3.45% of the locality's population in which 2,895 were men and 2,910 were women. It also has 1,500 inhabited private homes.

== Economy ==
Huitzila has a low degree of marginalization and a very low degree of social backwardness.
