= Zapotlán de Juárez =

- Town and municipality
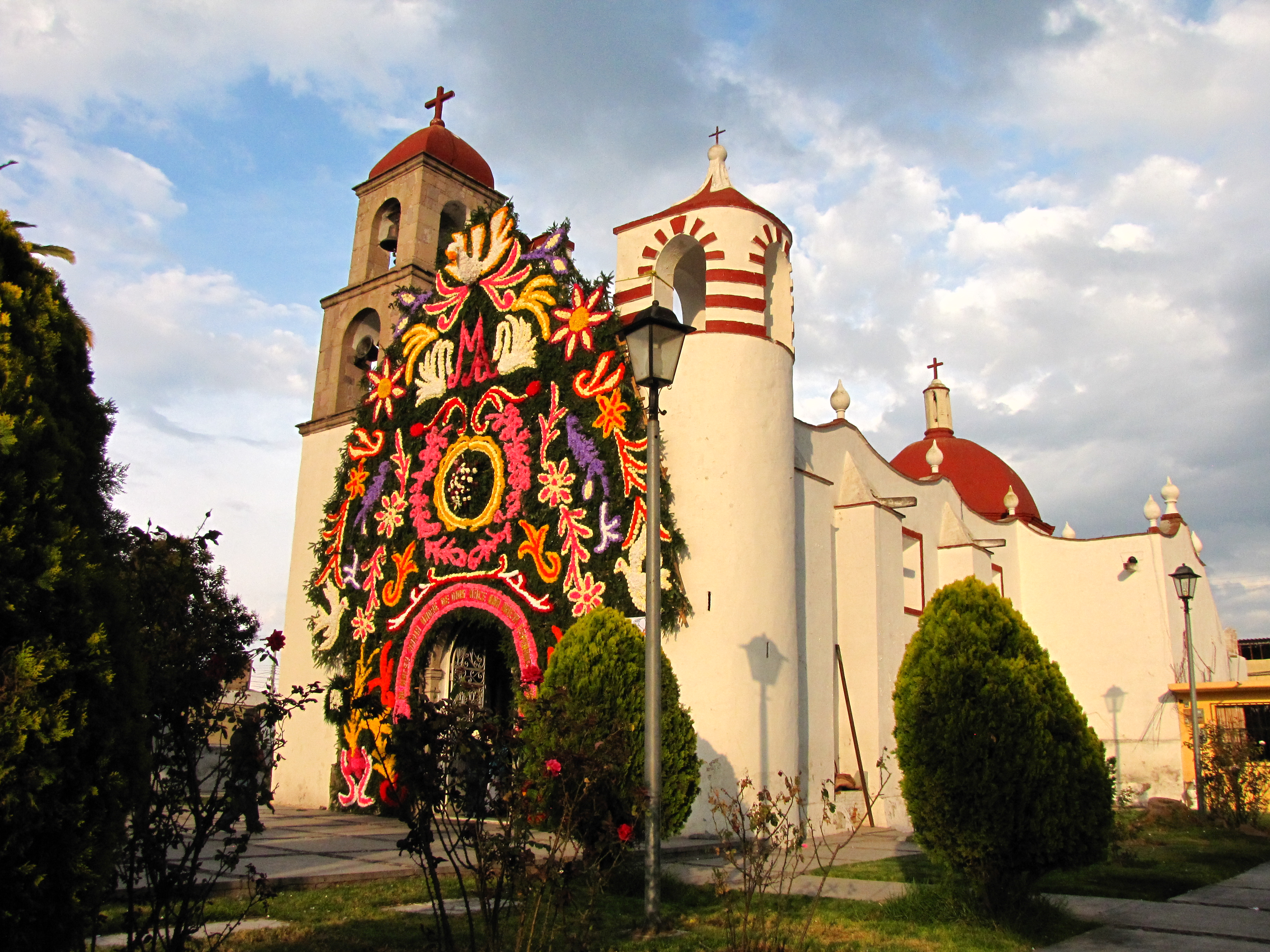

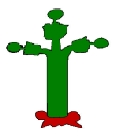
- Coat of arms

- Location within Hidalgo Location within Mexico
- Coordinates: 19°58′N 98°51′W
- Country: Mexico
- State: Hidalgo
- Municipality: Zapotlán de Juárez

Government
  - Federal electoral district: Hidalgo's 7th

Area
  - Total: 131.1 km^{2} (50.6 sq mi)

Population (2005)
  - Total: 16,493
- Time zone: UTC-6 (Zona Centro)
- Website: zapotlan.hidalgo.gob.mx

Zapotlán de Juárez is a town and one of the 84 municipalities of Hidalgo, in central-eastern Mexico. The municipality covers an area of 131.1 km^{2}.

As of 2005, the municipality had a total population of 16,493.

In this municipality is produced agricole products and meat.

The municipality has 20 km of the Mexico-Pachuca Highway and has another 18 km of federal roads between the three principal towns of the municipality (Zapotlán, San Pedro Huaquilpan and Acayuca).

The municipality is located in the southern part of Hidalgo and borders on the municipalities of Pachuca to the North, Tolcayuca to the South and West, Zempoala to the East, and Tezontepec to the South.
