= Aqueduct of Padre Tembleque =

Aqueduct of Padre Tembleque Hydraulic System
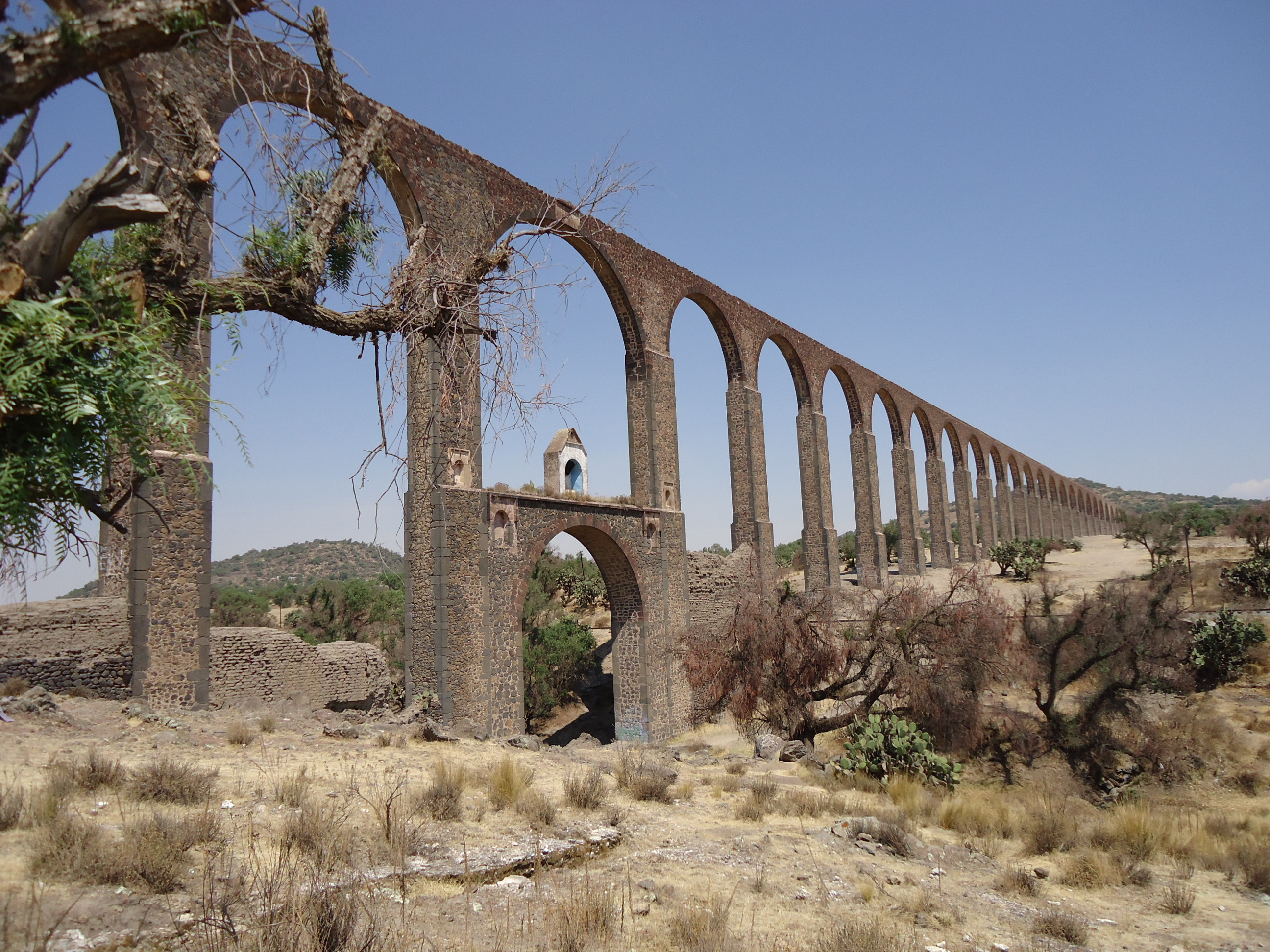
- Coordinates: 19°50′04″N 98°39′45″W
- Begins: Zempoala, Hidalgo
- Ends: Otumba, Mexico State
- Official name: Sistema Hidráulico del Acueducto del Padre Tembleque

Characteristics
- Total length: 45 kilometres (28 mi)
- Height: 38.75 metres (127.1 ft) Main Arcade

History
- Construction start: 1553
- Opened: 1570

UNESCO World Heritage Site
- Type: Cultural
- Criteria: i, ii, iv
- Designated: 2015 (39th session)
- Reference no.: 1463
- Region: Hispano America and the Caribbean

Location
- Interactive map of Aqueduct of Padre Tembleque Hydraulic System

The Aqueduct of Padre Tembleque, or Tembleque Aqueduct, is a Mexican aqueduct located between the towns of Zempoala, Hidalgo, and Otumba in the State of Mexico.

The structure takes its name from a Spanish friar called Francisco de Tembleque.

== Site description ==
Originally constructed between 1553 and 1570, the aqueduct stretches 45 kilometres (28 mi) long, beginning at Tecajete volcano just east of Zempoala and terminating at Otumba. It passed mostly at ground level, but also went underground as well as over ravines and valleys. There are three arcades along the aqueduct: the first has 46 arches, the second has 13, and the third has 67 arches. The highest valley the aqueduct spans is Papalote ravine, which is crossed by the 67-arch arcade also known as the Main Arcade, with the tallest arch standing 38.75 metres (127.1 ft).

== World Heritage Site status ==
This site was added to the UNESCO World Heritage Tentative List on 20 November 2001 in the Cultural category. It was inscribed on the World Heritage Site list on 5 July 2015.

== See also ==
- Acueducto del Padre Tembleque on the Spanish Wikipedia
- List of World Heritage Sites in Mexico
