= Tolcayuca =

- Town and municipality
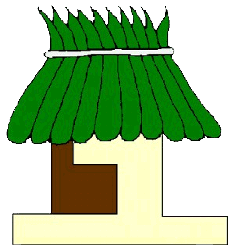
- Coat of arms

- Location within Hidalgo Location within Mexico
- Coordinates: 19°57′N 98°55′W
- Country: Mexico
- State: Hidalgo
- Municipality: Tolcayuca

Government
  - Federal electoral district: Hidalgo's 7th

Area
  - Total: 120.8 km^{2} (46.6 sq mi)

Population (2005)
  - Total: 11,746
- Time zone: UTC-6 (Zona Centro)
- Website: tolcayucahidalgo.gob.mx

Tolcayuca is a town and one of the 84 municipalities of Hidalgo, in central-eastern Mexico. The municipality covers an area of 120.8 km^{2} (46.6 sq mi).

As of 2005, the municipality had a total population of 11,746.
