= Zempoala, Hidalgo =

Zempoala
- Town and municipality
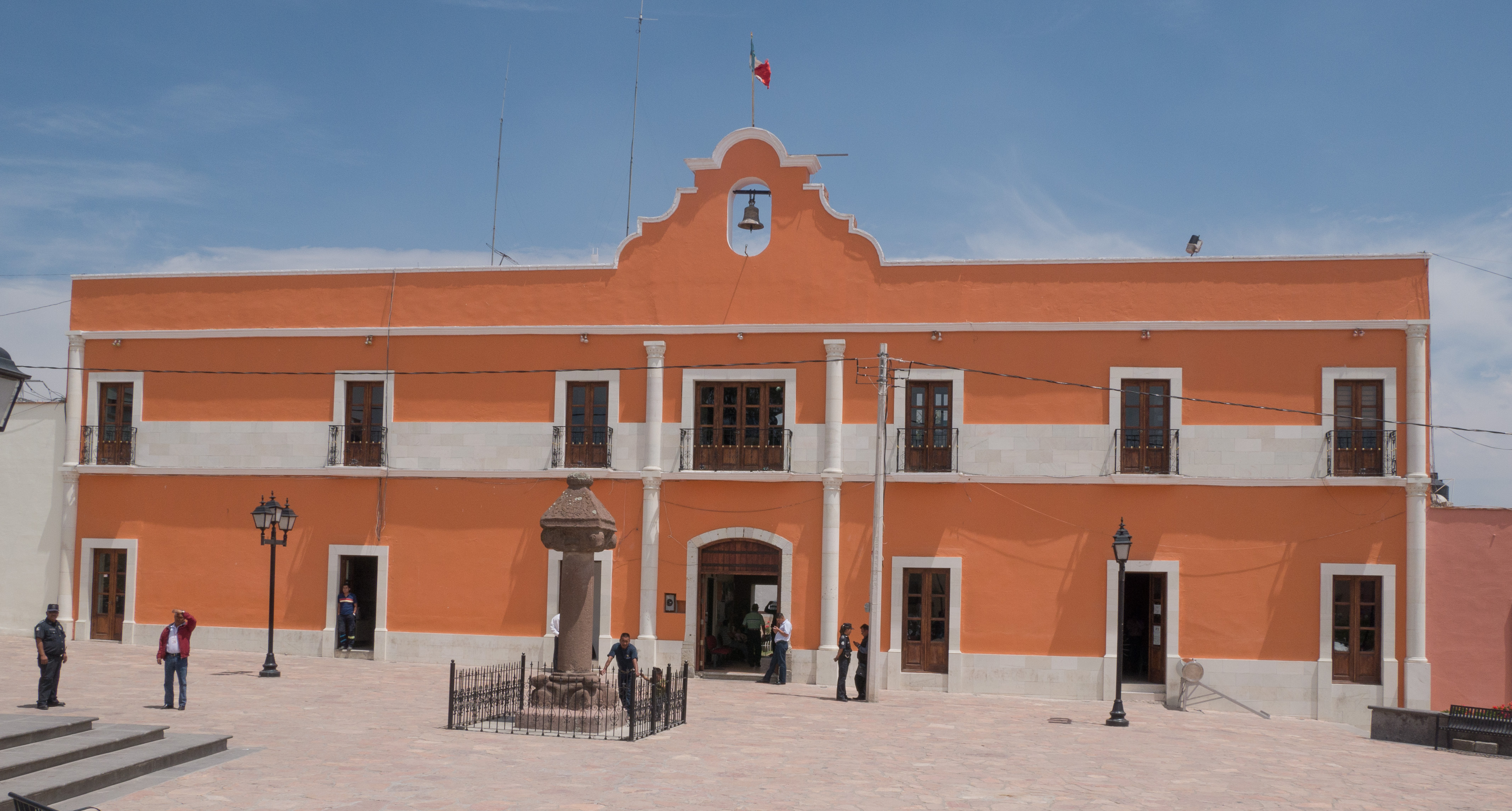

- Coat of arms

- Location within Hidalgo Location within Mexico
- Coordinates: 19°54′55″N 98°40′08″W
- Country: Mexico
- State: Hidalgo
- Municipality: Zempoala

Government
  - Federal electoral district: Hidalgo's 7th

Area
  - Total: 305.8 km^{2} (118.1 sq mi)

Population (2020)
  - Total: 57,906
- Time zone: UTC-6 (Zona Centro)
- Postal code: 43830
- Website: zempoala.gob.mx

Zempoala is a town and one of the 84 municipalities of Hidalgo, in central-eastern Mexico. The municipality covers an area of 319.78 km^{2}. The name Zempoala derives from the Nahuatl roots "Cempoalli", meaning "twenty" and "tlan", meaning "place"; giving Zempoala the meaning of "place of twenties", referring to the market held every twenty days.

As of 2020, the municipality had a total population of 57,906.

== History ==
Zempoala was an important place in the prehispanic culture, inhabited by Toltecs and Chichimecs, the latter arriving in the year 1120, guided by King Xolotl. By 1167, Zempoala was head of the province, being ruled by King Xolotl's son, Nopaltzin. In 1430, the province fell to Texcoco.

In 1540, the Spanish arrived to the area. Juan Pérez de Gama was the first encomendero of Zempoala. Between 1553 and 1570, the Aqueduct of Padre Tembleque was built between Zempoala and Otumba, which would be designated a UNESCO World Heritage Site in 2015.

On 1 December 2020, the city of Zempoala was declared a Pueblo Mágico.

== Geography ==
=== Climate ===
Climate data for Zempoala
Month	Jan	Feb	Mar	Apr	May	Jun	Jul	Aug	Sep	Oct	Nov	Dec	Year
Mean daily maximum °C (°F)	19.4 (66.9)	20.8 (69.4)	24.1 (75.4)	26.0 (78.8)	26.2 (79.2)	24.5 (76.1)	23.4 (74.1)	23.2 (73.8)	23 (73)	22.0 (71.6)	20.7 (69.3)	19.3 (66.7)	22.7 (72.9)
Mean daily minimum °C (°F)	2 (36)	3.1 (37.6)	4.7 (40.5)	6.3 (43.3)	7.3 (45.1)	7.6 (45.7)	7.7 (45.9)	7.4 (45.3)	7 (45)	6.0 (42.8)	4.2 (39.6)	3.1 (37.6)	5.6 (42.1)
Average precipitation mm (inches)	13 (0.5)	10 (0.4)	20 (0.8)	41 (1.6)	58 (2.3)	86 (3.4)	97 (3.8)	84 (3.3)	64 (2.5)	30 (1.2)	15 (0.6)	5.1 (0.2)	520 (20.6)
Source: Weatherbase
