= Tizayuca =

- Town and municipality
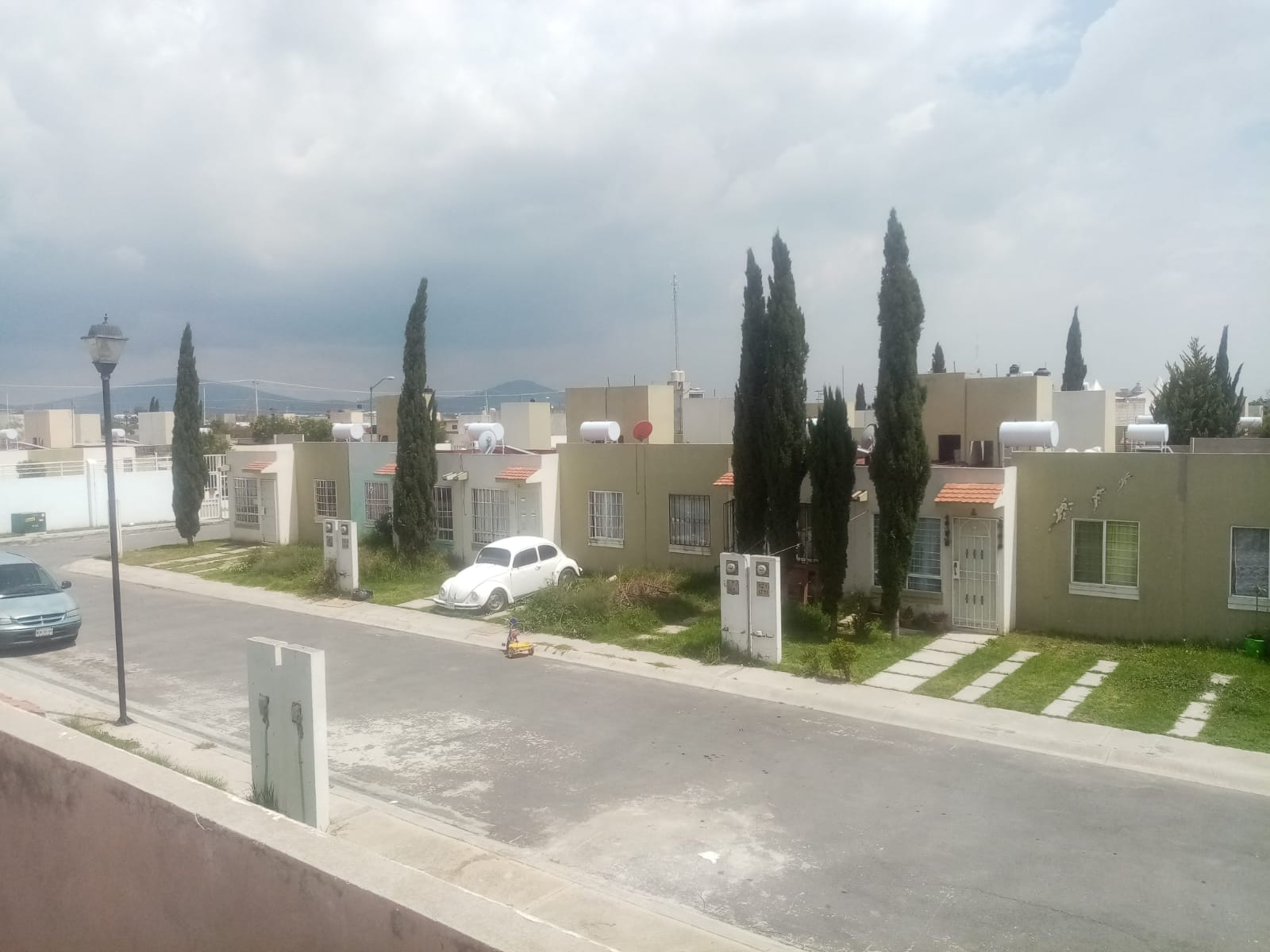
- Residential area in Tizayuca

- Coat of arms

- Location within Hidalgo Location within Mexico
- Coordinates: 19°50′N 98°59′W
- Country: Mexico
- State: Hidalgo
- Municipality: Tizayuca

Government
  - Federal electoral district: Hidalgo's 7th

Area
  - Total: 76.81 km^{2} (29.66 sq mi)

Population (2020)
  - Total: 60,265
  - Municipality: 168,302
- Time zone: UTC-6 (Zona Centro)
- Website: tizayuca.gob.mx

Tizayuca is one of the 84 municipalities of Hidalgo, in central Mexico. The city of Tizayuca is the municipal seat. The population of the city is 60,265 and the municipality has 168,302 inhabitants.

== Geography ==
The municipality covers an area of 76.81 km^{2}.

It is the only municipality in the state of Hidalgo that is officially part of the Mexico City Metropolitan Area, while the metro area of Pachuca surrounds the north and west limits.

As of 2005, the municipality had a total population of 56,573, but this has grown rapidly to reach 97,461 at the 2010 Census and 168,302 at the 2020 Census.

== History ==
Tizayuca was originally a Pre-Columbian Nahua settlement in the Valley of Mexico.
