= Tezontepec =

- Town and municipality
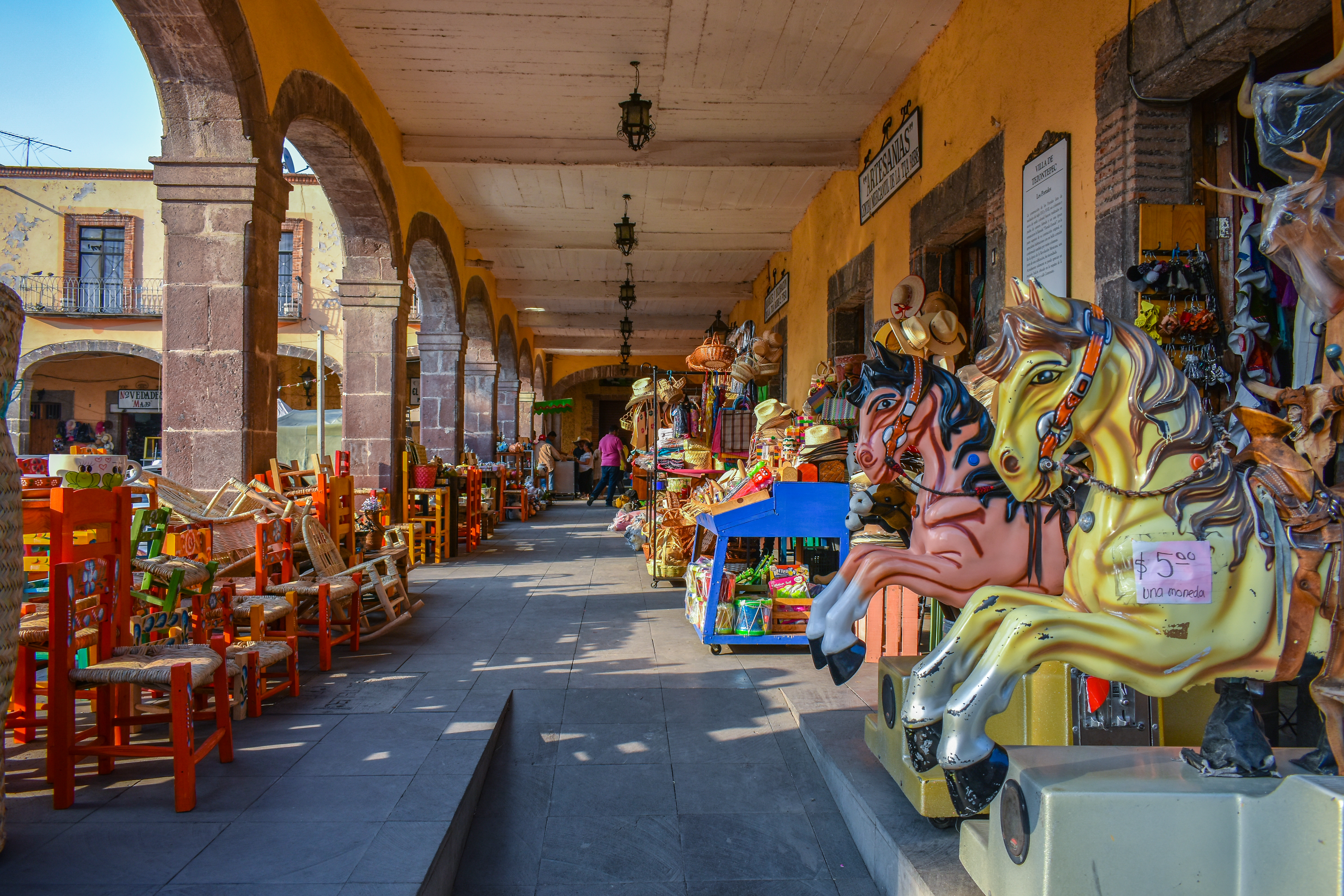
- Handcrafts on sale in Villa de Tezontepec

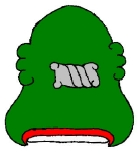
- Coat of arms

- Location within Hidalgo Location within Mexico
- Coordinates: 19°53′N 98°49′W
- Country: Mexico
- State: Hidalgo
- Municipality: Tezontepec

Government
  - Federal electoral district: Hidalgo's 7th

Area
  - Total: 133.6 km^{2} (51.6 sq mi)

Population (2020)
  - Total: 13,032
- Time zone: UTC-6 (Zona Centro)
- Website: tezontepec.gob.mx

Tezontepec (also Villa de Tezontepec and Tezontepec de Aldama) is a town and one of the 84 municipalities of Hidalgo, in central-eastern Mexico.

The municipality covers an area of 133.6 km^{2} (51.6 sq mi) and, in the 2020 INEGI census, reported a total population of 13,032.
