= Chorzów =

Chorzów Chorzōw (Silesian)
- City county
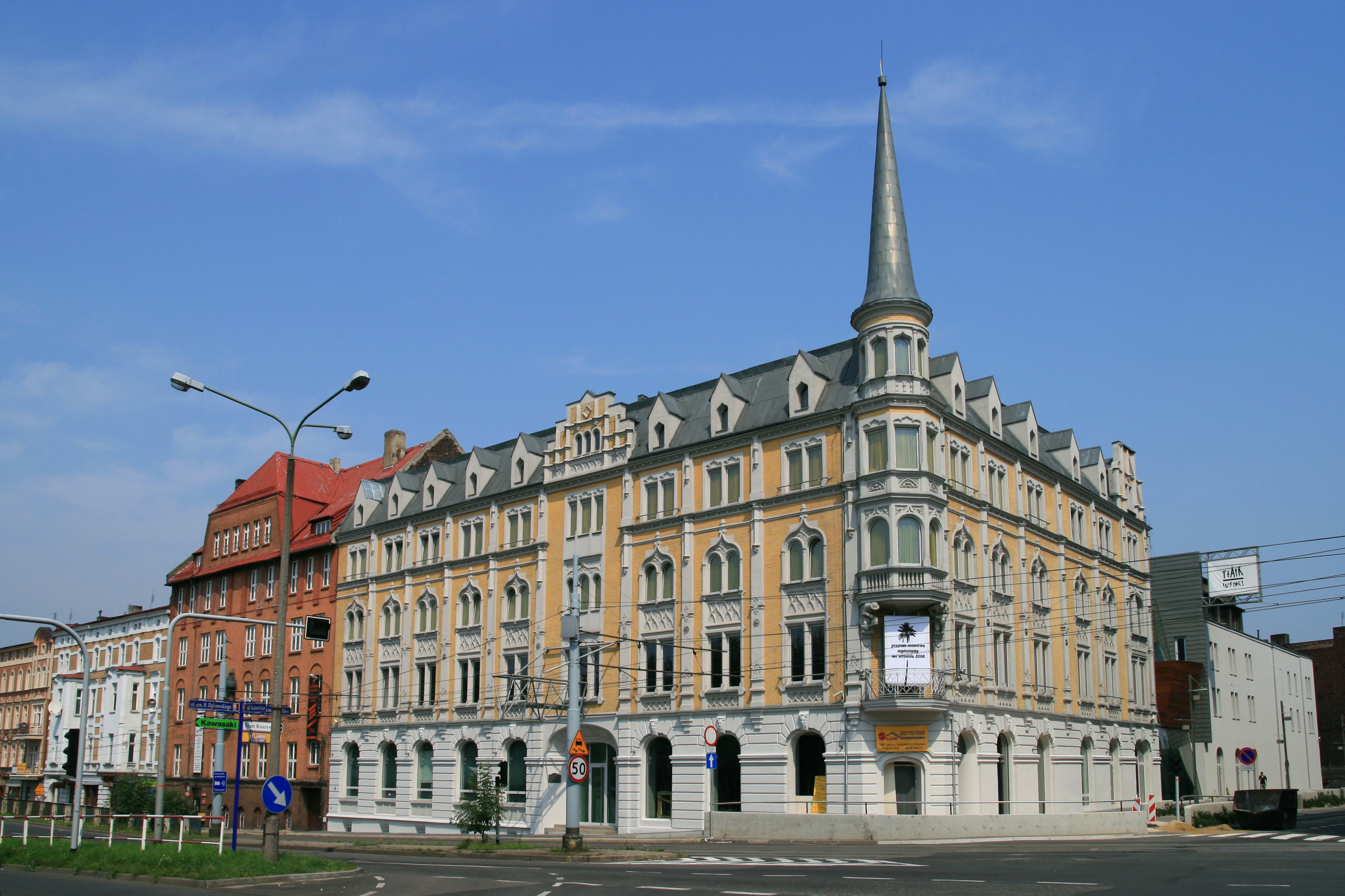
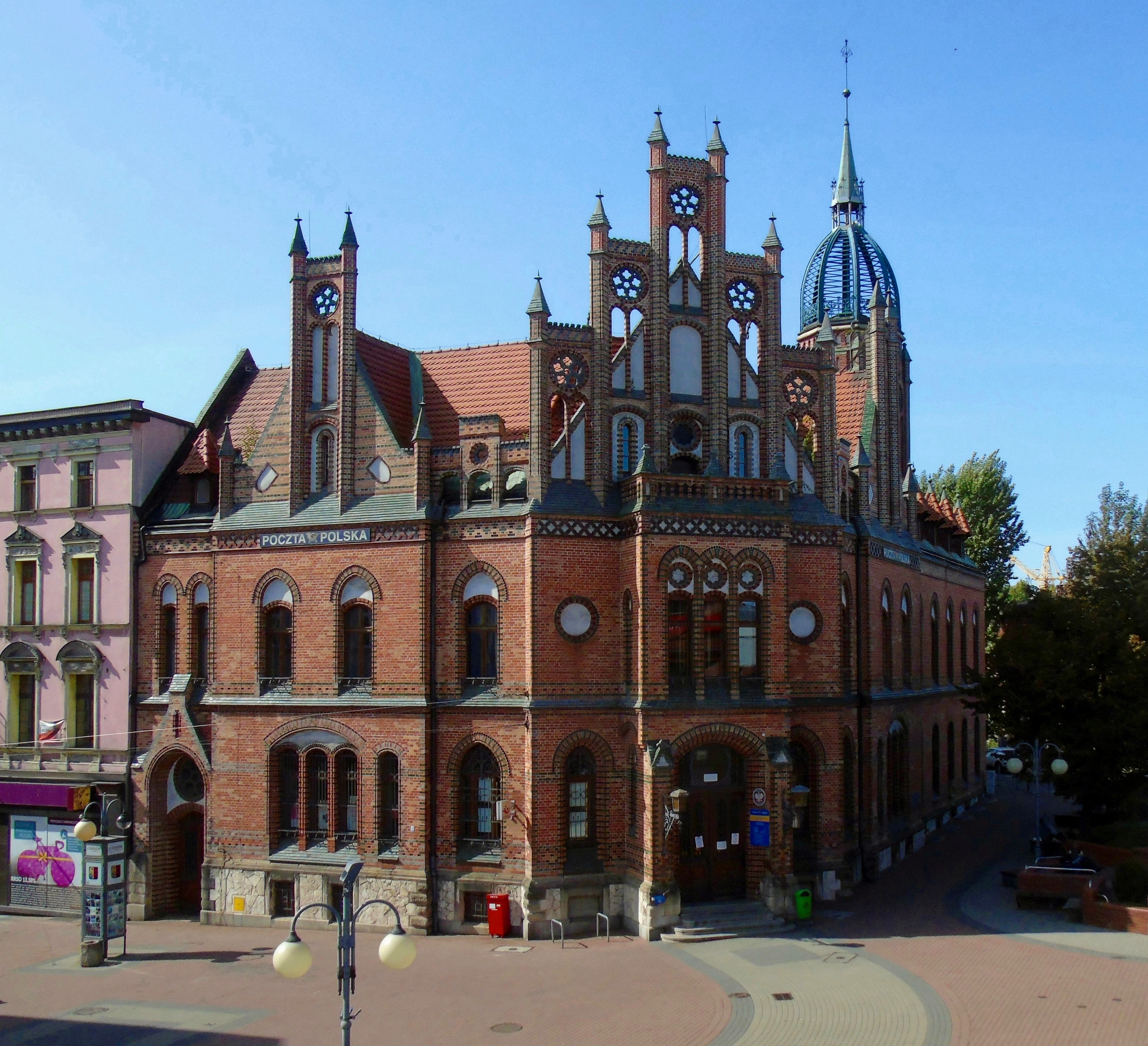
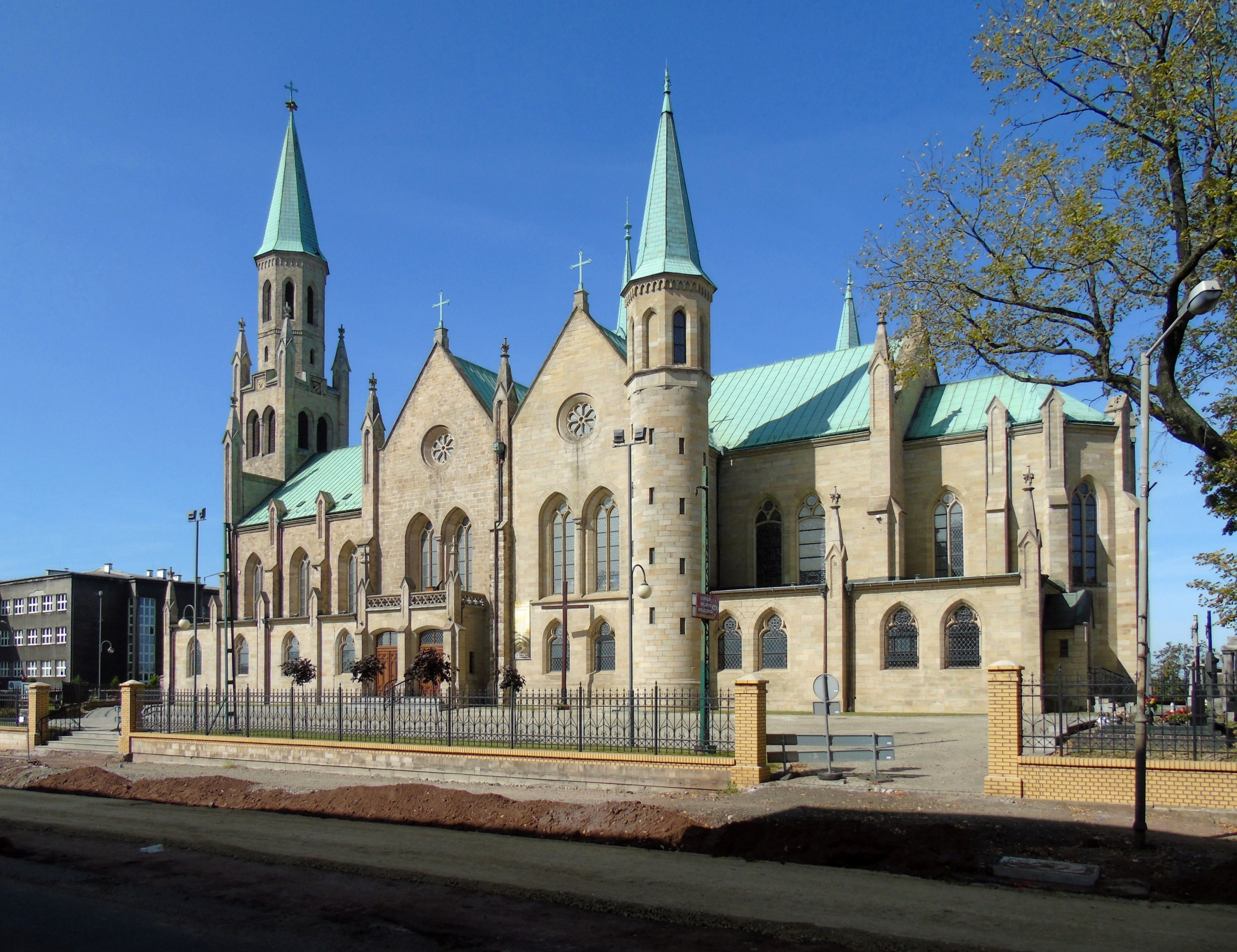
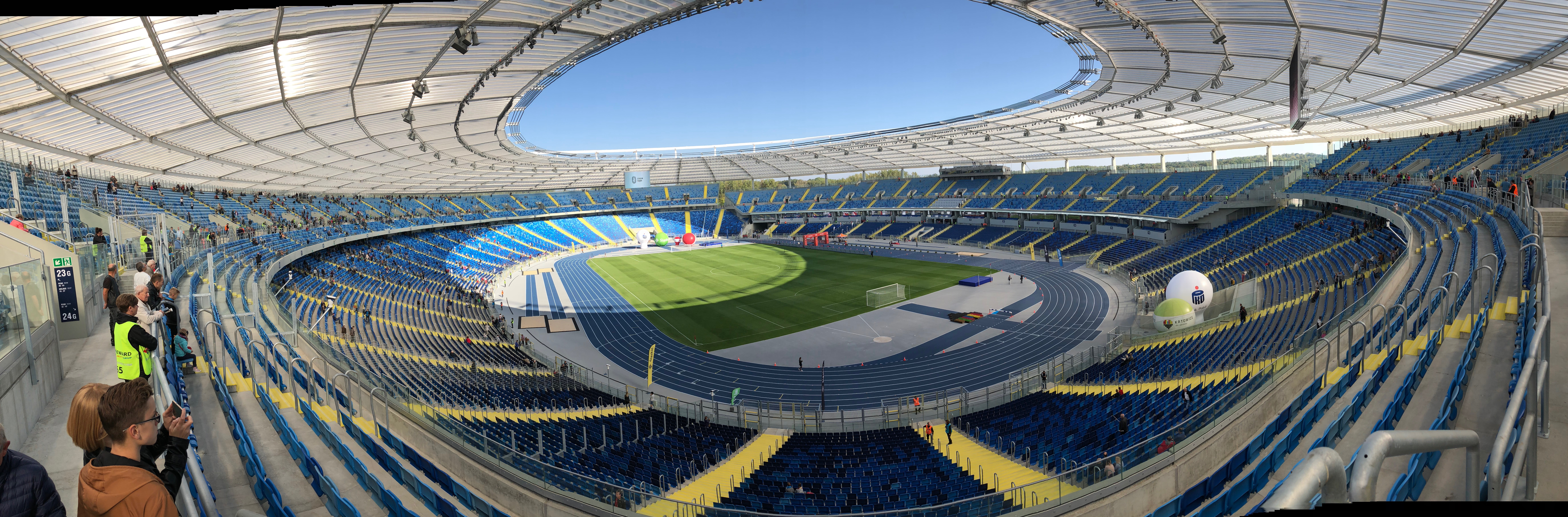
- Teatr Rozrywki Main post office St. Barbara's Church Silesian Stadium

- Flag Coat of arms

- Location within Poland
- Coordinates: 50°18′N 18°57′E
- Country: Poland
- Voivodeship: Silesian
- County: city county
- Established: 1257
- City rights: 1868

Government
  - City mayor: Szymon Michałek (Ind.)

Area
  - City county: 33.24 km^{2} (12.83 sq mi)

Population (31 December 2021)
  - City county: 105,628 ▼
  - Density: 3,166.9/km^{2} (8,202/sq mi)
  - Urban: 2,746,000
  - Metro: 4,620,624
- Time zone: UTC+1 (CET)
  - Summer (DST): UTC+2 (CEST)
- Postal code: 41–500 to 41–506
- Area code: +48 32
- Car plates: SH
- Primary airport: Katowice Airport
- Website: https://chorzow.eu/

Chorzów (/ˈxɒʒuːf/ KHOZH-oof; Polish: [ˈxɔʐuf]; German: Königshütte [ˈkøːnɪçsˌhʏtə]; Silesian: Chorzōw) is a city in the Silesia region of southern Poland, near Katowice. Chorzów is one of the central cities of the Metropolis GZM – a metropolis with a population of 2 million. It is located in the Silesian Highlands, on the Rawa River (a tributary of the Vistula).

Administratively, Chorzów is in the Silesian Voivodeship since 1999, previously Katowice Voivodeship, and before then, the Silesian Voivodeship. Chorzów is one of the cities of the 2.7 million conurbation – the Katowice urban area and within a greater Katowice-Ostrava metropolitan area with a population of about 5,294,000 people. The population within the city limits is 105,628 as of December 2021.

Chorzów is particularly known as the location of the Silesian Stadium, one of the largest and historically most important stadiums in Poland. Ruch Chorzów, one of the most accomplished Polish football clubs, is based in the city.

== History ==
=== City name ===
The city of Chorzów was formed in 1934–1939 by a merger of four adjacent cities: Chorzów, Królewska Huta, Nowe Hajduki and Hajduki Wielkie. The name of the oldest settlement Chorzów was applied to the amalgamated city.

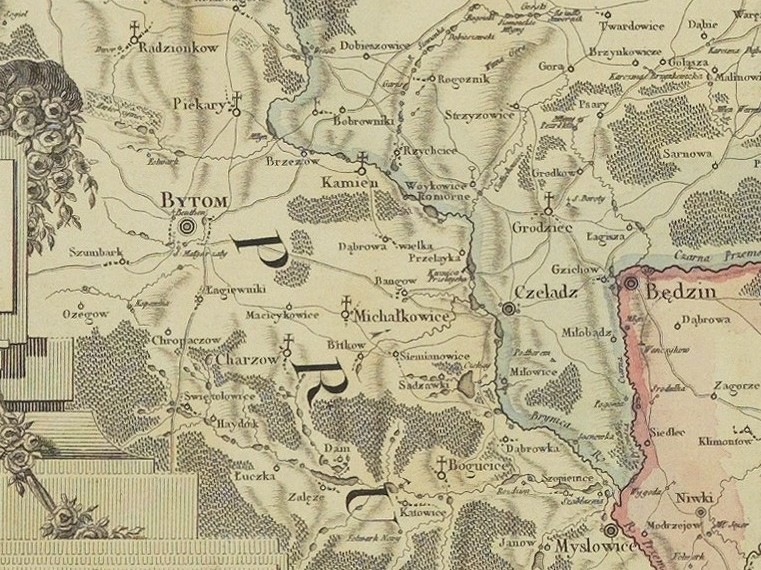
Chorzów as Charzow on an 18th-century Polish map

The etymology of the name is not known. Chorzów is believed to be first mentioned as Zversov or Zuersov in a document of 1136 by Pope Innocent II as a village with peasants, silver miners, and two inns. Another place-name likely indicating Chorzów is Coccham or Coccha, which is mentioned in a document of 1198 by the Patriarch of Jerusalem, who awarded this place to the Equestrian Order of the Holy Sepulchre of Jerusalem. Chorzów is then mentioned as Chareu or Charev in 1257 and then Charzow in 1292. The last name may originate from the personal name Charz, short for Zachary and may mean Zachary's place. The a in the early names may have been later modified to the current pronunciation with o perhaps due to similarity to the common adjective chory=ill and a presence of a hospital (which was moved in 1299 to Rozbark at the gates of Bytom). Today, the place of the old village is a subdivision called Chorzów III or Chorzów Stary (Old Chorzów).

The industrial and residential settlement south-west of Chorzów constructed since 1797 around the Royal Coal Mine and Royal Iron Works was named Królewska Huta by the Poles or Königshütte by the Germans, both names meaning Royal Iron Works. As it was growing quickly this settlement was granted city status in 1868. Today this neighbourhood is called Chorzów I or Chorzów-Miasto meaning Chorzów Centre.

The etymology of Hajduki is ambiguous and is interpreted as either related to the German word for moorland (German: die Heide), or adopted from the German/Polish/Silesian term for hajduk(s) (Polish (plural): Hajduki; German (singular): Heiduck), which locally meant bandits. The place was first mentioned in 1627 as Hejduk and shown on 18th century maps as "Ober Heiduk" and "Nieder Heiduk" (i.e., Upper and Lower Heiduk). The later names Hajduki Wielkie and Nowe Hajduki mean Great Hajduks and New Hajduks, respectively. The two settlements were merged in 1903 and named after the Bismarck Iron Works Bismarckhütte. When the international borders shifted, the name of Bismarck was replaced with the name of the Polish king Batory (so-chosen to preserve that initial "B", which appeared on an economically important local trademark). Today this city subdivision is called Chorzów IV or Chorzów-Batory.

=== Village of Chorzów ===
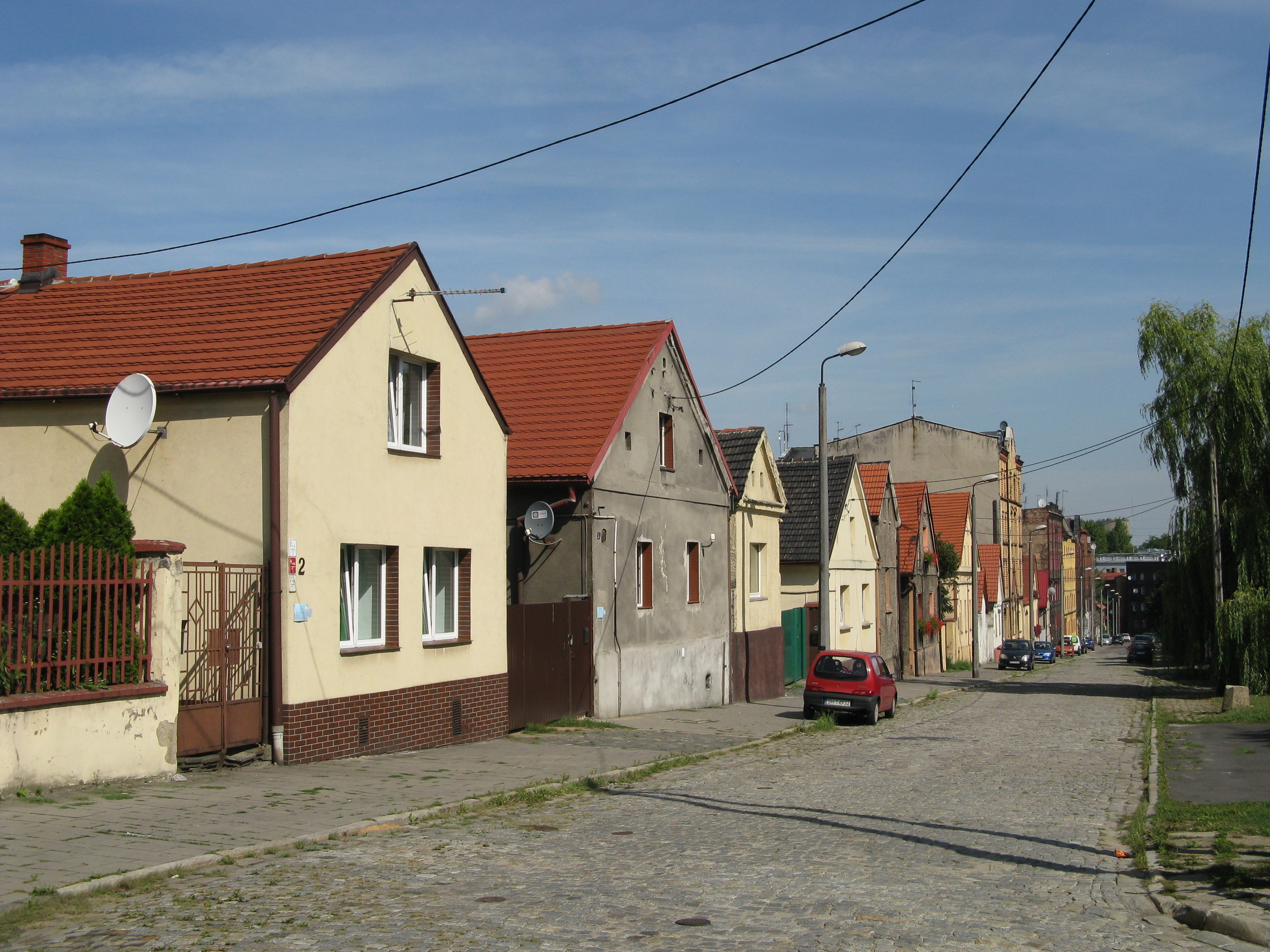
Chorzow Stary

In the 12th century, the castellany of Bytom, including the Chorzów area, belonged to the Seniorate Province (Kraków Duchy) of Poland. In 1179 it was awarded by Duke Casimir the Just to the Duke of Opole, and since that time the history of Chorzów has been connected to the history of Upper Silesia (Duchy of Opole).

The oldest part of the city, the village of Chorzów, today called Chorzów Stary, belonged since 1257 to the Equestrian Order of the Holy Sepulchre of Jerusalem. Already at that time silver and lead ores were mined nearby, later also the ores of iron. There is more documentation for 16th century developments.

From 1327, the Upper Silesian duchies were ruled by the dukes of the Piast dynasty and were subject to Bohemian overlordship. The Crown of Bohemia elected Polish-Lithuanian Jagiellons kings from 1471 and Austrian Habsburgs kings after 1526. In 1742, the area was conquered by the Prussian Hohenzollerns in Silesian Wars, setting the stage for the Prussian industrial might. The Prussian and then German period lasted for about 180 years and overlapped with the time of rapid industrialization.

=== Industrial revolution ===
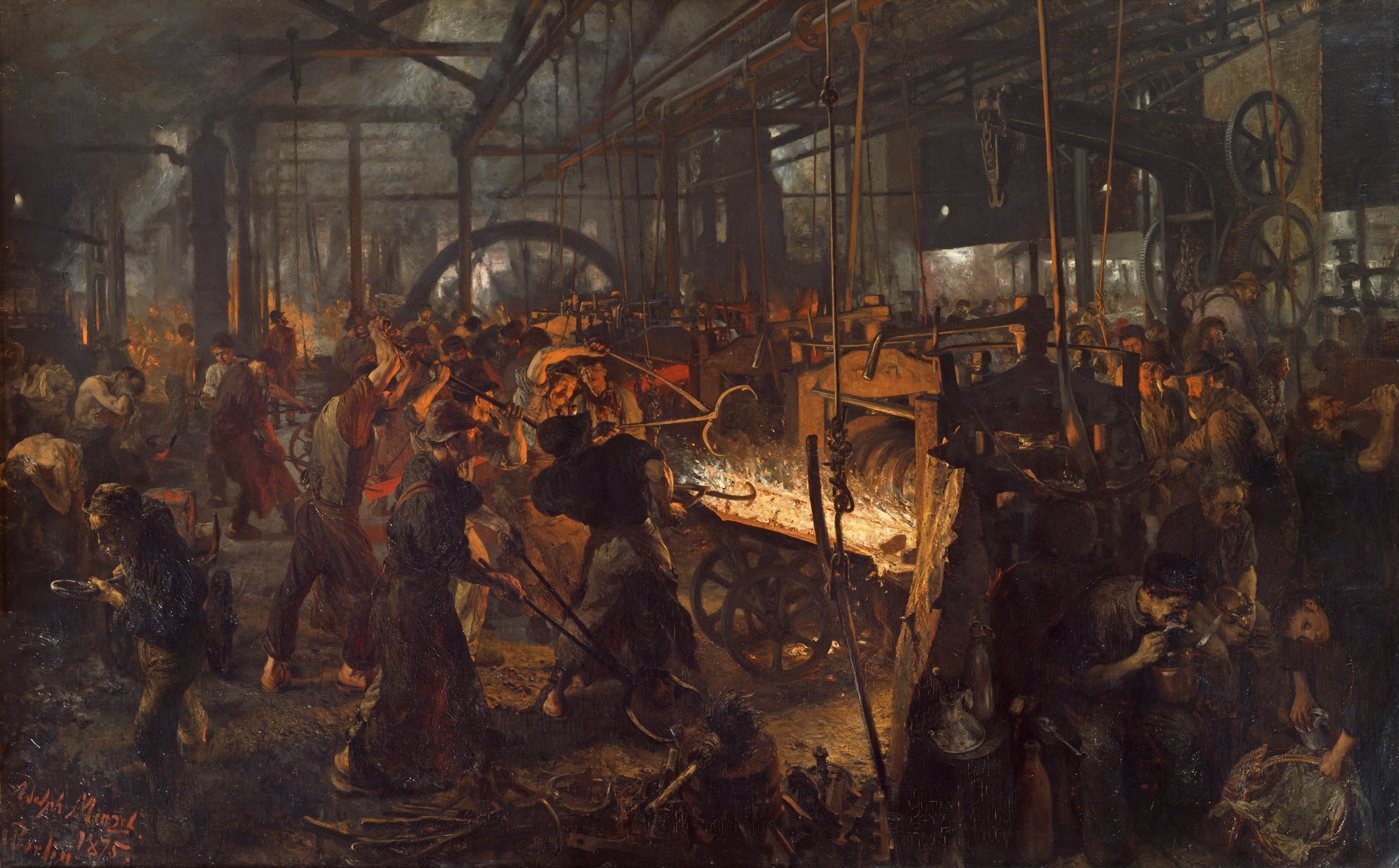
Steelworks at Königshütte, 1872–1875 ("Das Eisenwalzwerk" by Adolf von Menzel)

With the discovery of bituminous coal deposits at the end of the 18th century by the Polish local priest Ludwik Bojarski, new industrial sectors developed in the Chorzów area. In the years 1791–1797, the Prussian state-owned Royal Coal Mine was constructed (Kopalnia Król, Königsgrube, later renamed several times with the changing political winds). In 1799, the first pig iron was made in the Royal Iron Works (Królewska Huta, Königshütte). At the time, it was a pioneering industrial establishment of its kind in continental Europe. In 1819, the ironworks consisted of four blast furnaces, producing 1,400 tons of pig-iron. In the 1800s, the modern Lidognia Zinc Works was added in the area.

Settlements grew near the new coal and ironworks. Since 1797, one group of settlements was called Königshütte (Królewska Huta in Polish) after the ironworks. In 1846, Królewska Huta received a railway track to Świętochłowice and Mysłowice and in 1857 to Bytom and until 1872 to all major cities in the Silesian region. Królewska Huta received city status in 1868 as part of Bytom County, and in 1898, it was made a separate city-county. The population was increasing rapidly: from 19,500 inhabitants in 1870 to 72,600 in 1910. Among them 17,300 workers were employed in the industry (similar number for 1939). In 1871, there was a workers' rebellion in the city.

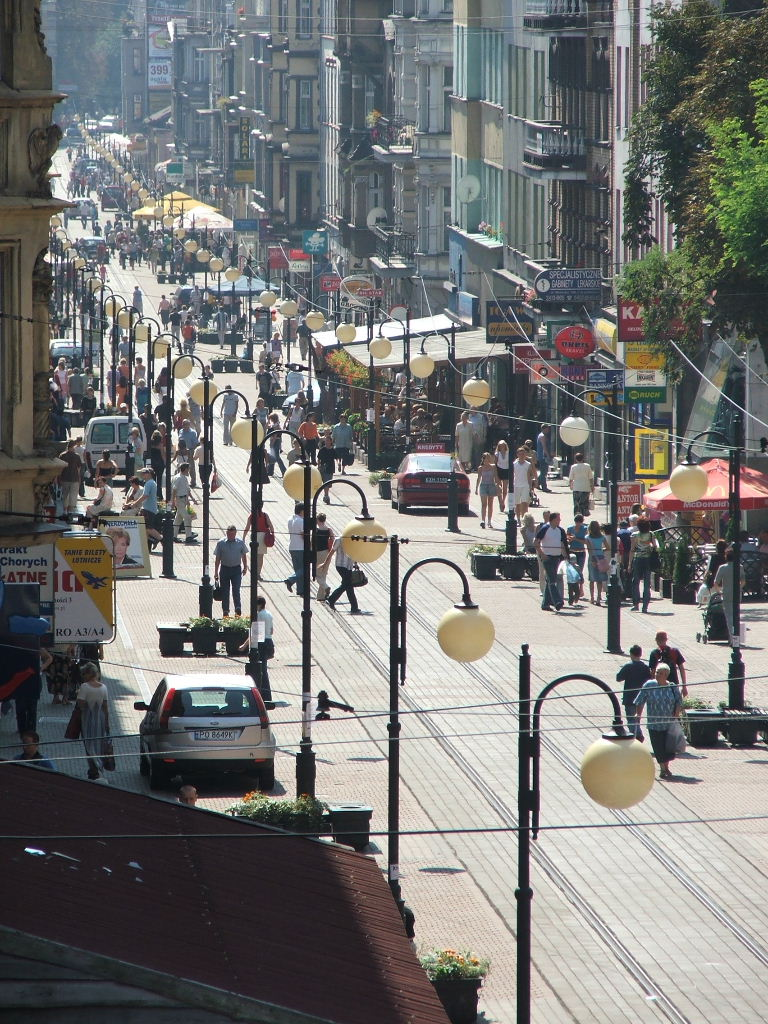
Ulica Wolności (Freedom Street), one of the main areas of commerce in the city

The Royal Iron Works were taken over in 1871 by the holding called Vereingte Königs- und Laurahütte AG für Bergbau und Hüttenbetrieb, which added a steel mill, rail mill and workshops. In the vicinity of the Royal Coal Mine, Countess Laura Coal Mine was opened in 1870, and by 1913–1914 coal production increased to 1 million tons a year. In 1898, a thermal power plant was commissioned which was, until the 1930s, the biggest electricity producer in Poland with a power of 100 MW (electrical). Today, it operates as "ELCHO". In 1915, nitrogen chemical works (Oberschlesische Stickstoffwerke) were built nearby to produce fertilizers and explosives by newly invented processes: from the air, water and coal (see Haber-Bosch process). Today, it operates as "Zakłady Azotowe SA".

Another ironworks, Bismarck Iron Works (Bismarckhütte), later called Bathory Iron Works (Huta Batory), was opened in 1872 in the village of Hajduki Wielkie, just south of Chorzów and Królewska Huta. A large carbochemical plant was started nearby in 1889, the first such chemical plant in what was to later become the Polish state. Today the company operates as "Zakłady Koksochemiczne Hajduki SA".

Towards the end of the 19th century, Chorzów experienced a revival of Polish national feelings. Ethnic tensions were mixed with the religious and class conflicts. The city was a noted center of Polish printing and publishing in the region. Polish newspapers published there included Katolik since 1869 (editorial office briefly relocated to Mikołów in the 1870s), Poradnik Gospodarczy since 1871, Wiarus Katolicki since 1887, Górnoślązak. Pismo dla Ludu Katolickiego in 1888, replaced by Głos Ludu Górnośląskiego that same year, Gwiazda Górnoszlązka since 1893 (moved from Piekary Śląskie), Gazeta Katolicka since 1896, Dzwonek Maryi since 1901, and Dziennik Śląski since 1911 (moved from Bytom, then relocated to Katowice in 1919). Katolik (The Catholic) and Poradnik Gospodarczy (Economic Advisor) were published by noted Polish activist Karol Miarka. Karol Miarka was also the founder of several organizations: Upper Silesian Union, Upper Silesian Peasants Union. Polish activist and writer Juliusz Ligoń made his debut as a playwright and also published his popular works on the history of Upper Silesia in the city in the 1880s. The Polish press faced obstacles and harassment from the Prussian authorities. Bronisław Koraszewski, editor-in-chief of Głos Ludu Górnośląskiego, and Stanisław Czerniejewski, publisher of Gwiazda Górnoszlązka, were sentenced to prison. A local branch of the Polish Sokół movement was established in 1901, and a women's section in 1904, however, the latter was eventually dissolved by the German police. In 1920, the football club Ruch Chorzów was founded in the city. Later on, it would become one of the most successful Polish football teams.

=== Interwar Poland (1922–1939) ===
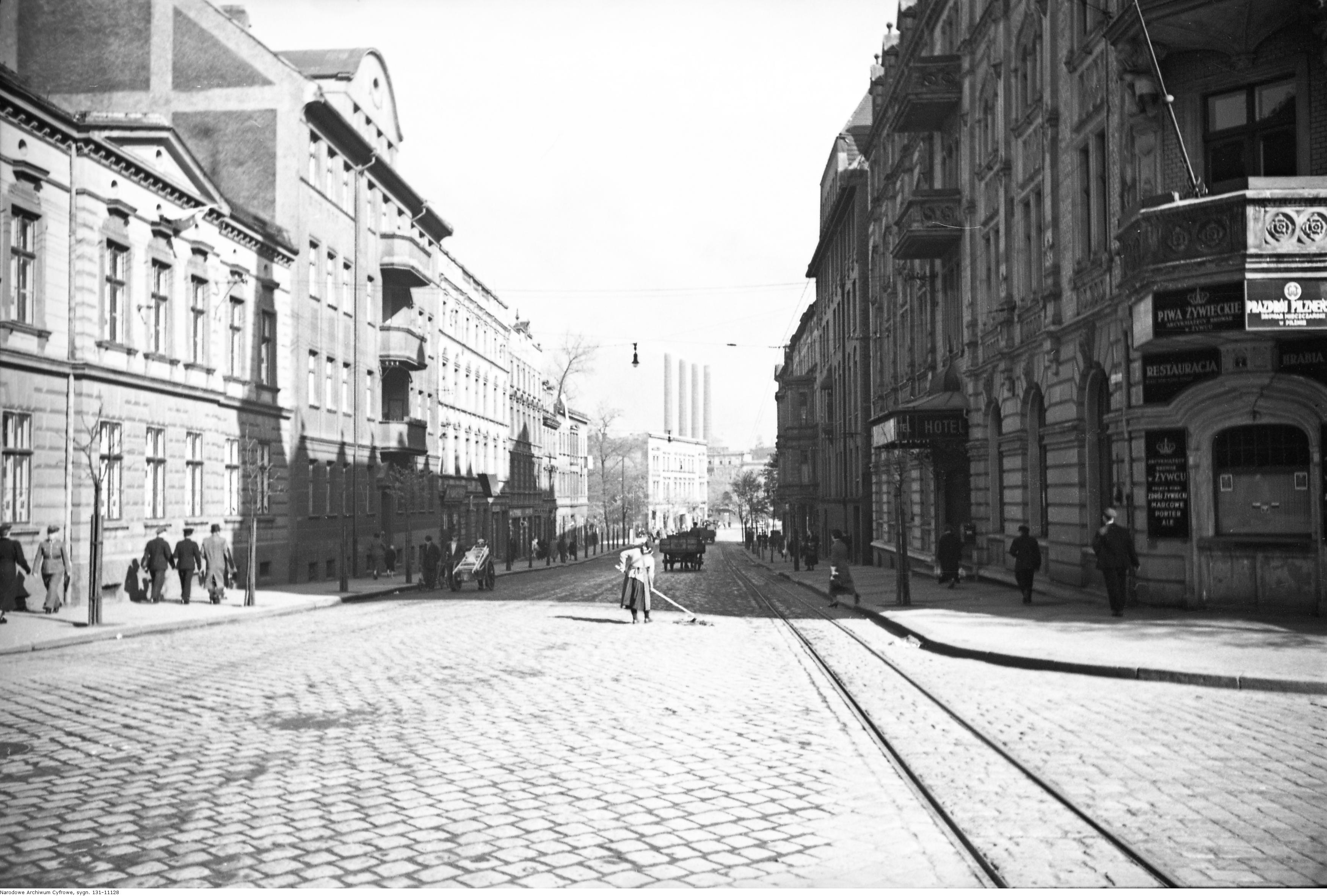
Chorzów in the 1930s

In the Upper Silesia plebiscite a majority of 31,864 voters voted to remain in Germany while 10,764 votes were given for Poland. Following three Silesian Uprisings, the eastern part of Silesia, including Chorzów and Królewska Huta, was separated from Germany and awarded to Poland in 1922. Migrations of people followed. Because of its strategic value, the Chorzów Factory case, involving the nitrogen factory Oberschlesische Stickstoffwerke, was argued for years before the Permanent Court of International Justice, finally setting some new legal precedents on what is "just" in international relations. In 1934, the industrial communities of Chorzów, Królewska Huta and Nowe Hajduki were merged into one municipality with 81,000 inhabitants. The name of the oldest settlement Chorzów was given to the whole city. In April 1939, the settlement of Hajduki Wielkie with 30,000 inhabitants was added to Chorzów.

In part due to the German-Polish trade war in the 1920s, the industry of Chorzów, a border city at that time, stagnated until 1933. In 1927, a division of Huta Piłsudski was separated into a company making rail cars, trams and bridges; today it operates as Alstom-Konstal. The State Factory of Nitrogen Compounds (Państwowa Fabryka Związków Azotowych) was in 1933 merged with a similar company (largely its copy) in Tarnów-Mościce.

=== German occupation during World War II (1939–1945) ===
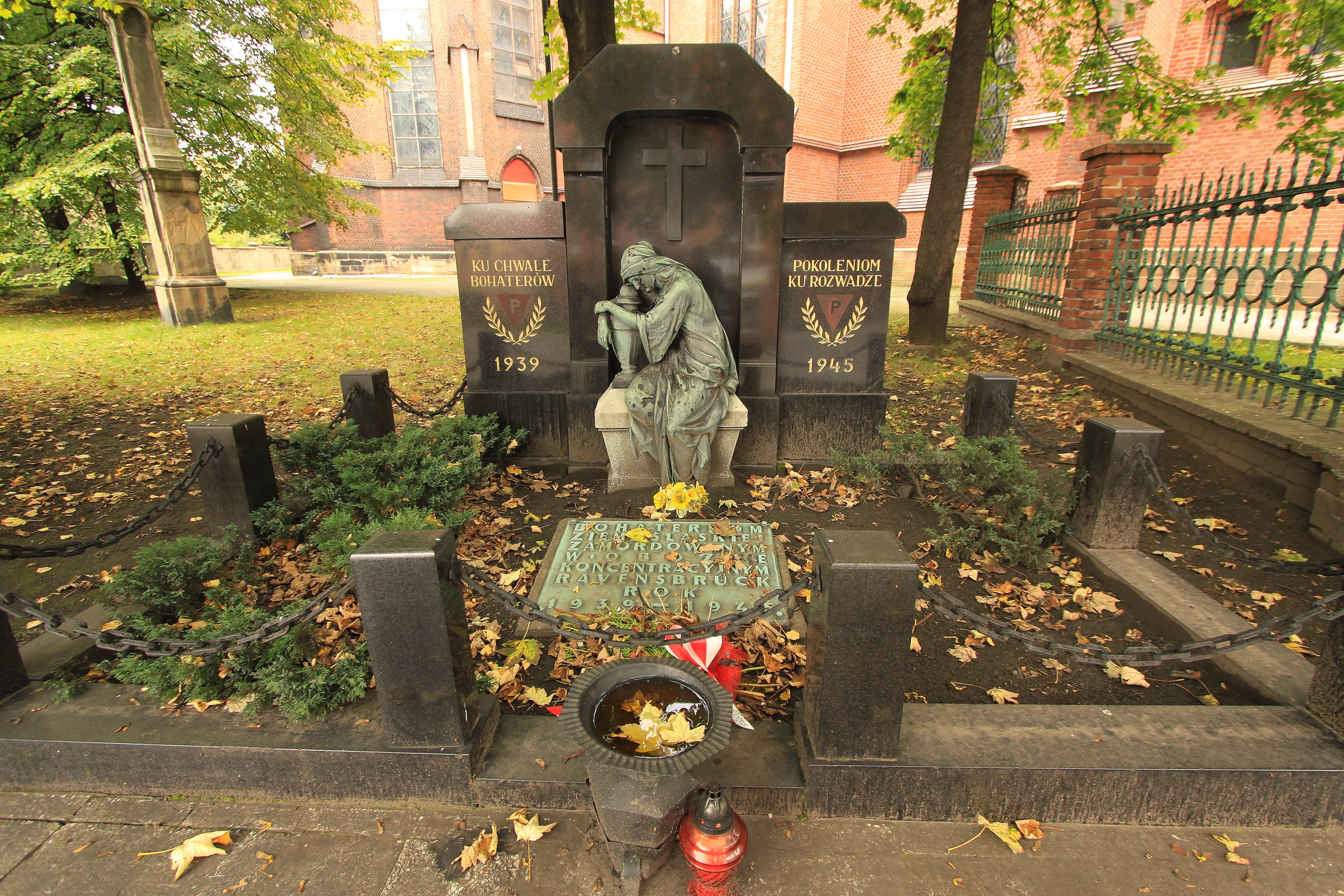
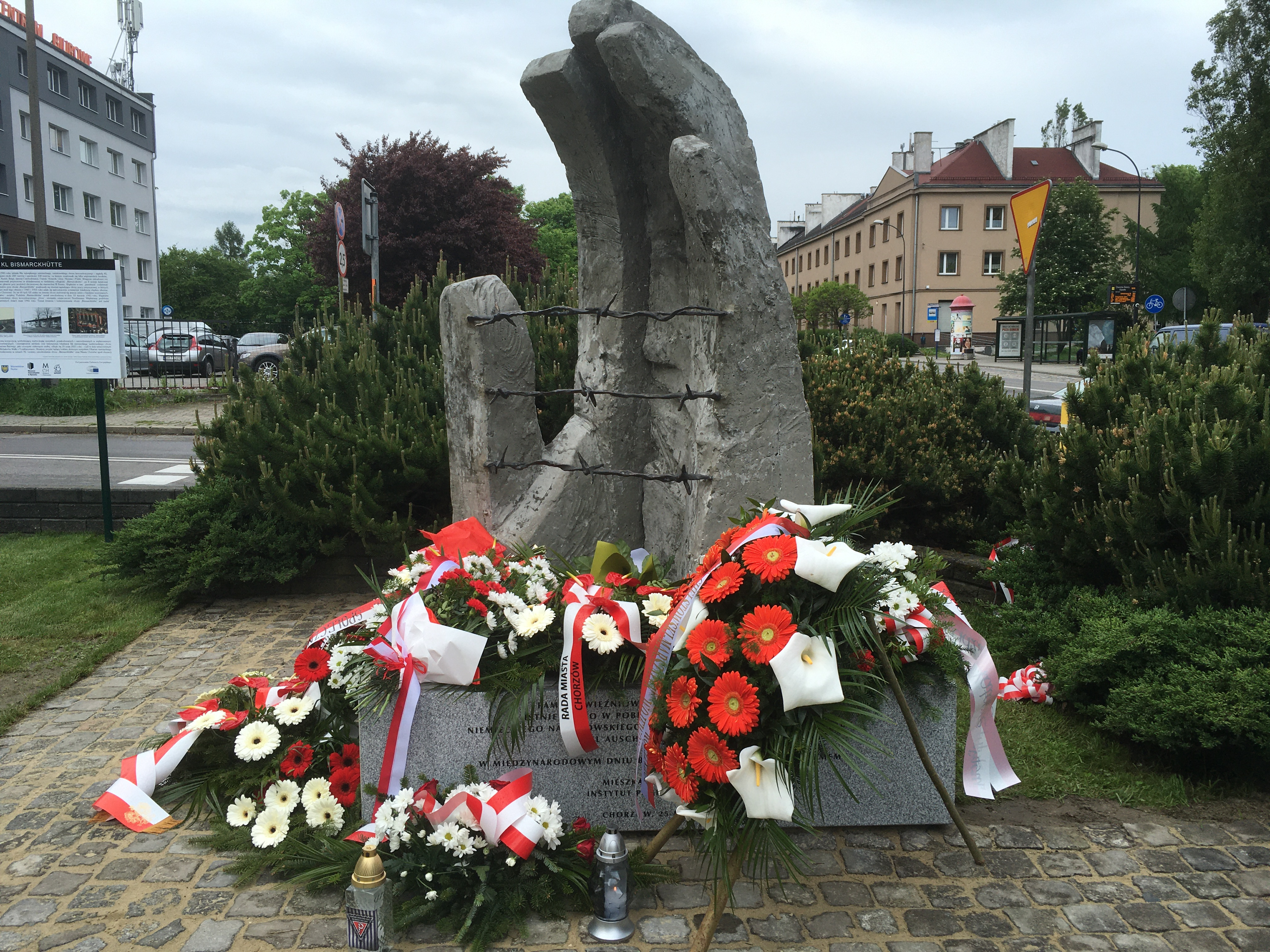
Memorials to local victims of the Ravensbrück concentration camp and victims of a local subcamp of the Auschwitz concentration camp

On the day of the outbreak of World War II in September 1939, Chorzów was taken by Nazi Germany. Polish irregulars, mainly Silesian uprising veterans and scouts, put up resistance to the regular German forces for three days, afterwards the city was occupied by Germany, and on September 6, 1939, the Einsatzgruppe I entered the city to commit various atrocities against Poles. Most of the Polish defenders were murdered in mass executions. An execution of three Poles was carried out by the German Freikorps already on September 3, 1939. A unit of the Einsatzgruppe I was stationed in Chorzów, and it was responsible for many crimes against Poles committed in Chorzów and the nearby cities of Czeladź and Siemianowice Śląskie. Polish property was confiscated, and Chorzów was promptly re-incorporated into German Silesia; the Upper Silesian industry being one of the pillars of the Nazi Germany war effort. In 1939 and 1940, the Germans carried out mass arrests of Polish intelligentsia, especially teachers, for which a prison was operated in the city (see Intelligenzaktion). Local Polish teachers were among Poles murdered in 1939 in Chorzów and Strzybnica (present-day district of Tarnowskie Góry), and later in the Dachau concentration camp.

At least 62 people from Chorzów, including the deputy starost, a local journalist, 37 policemen, nine teachers and two school principals were murdered by the Russians in the Katyn massacre in 1940.

There were several forced labour camps in Chorzów, including one Polenlager solely for Poles, two camps solely for Jews, the E246, E594 and E725 subcamps of the Stalag VIII-B/344 prisoner-of-war camp, and, in years 1944–1945, a subcamp of the Auschwitz concentration camp, in which approximately 200 Jews from German-occupied France, Belgium and Czechoslovakia were imprisoned. In January 1945, the prisoners of the subcamp of Auschwitz were evacuated on foot to Gliwice, and then deported to the Nordhausen-Dora concentration camp. Chorzów was occupied by the Soviet Red Army in January 1945 with the subsequent persecution of many ethnic Polish Silesians and Germans.

=== After 1945 ===
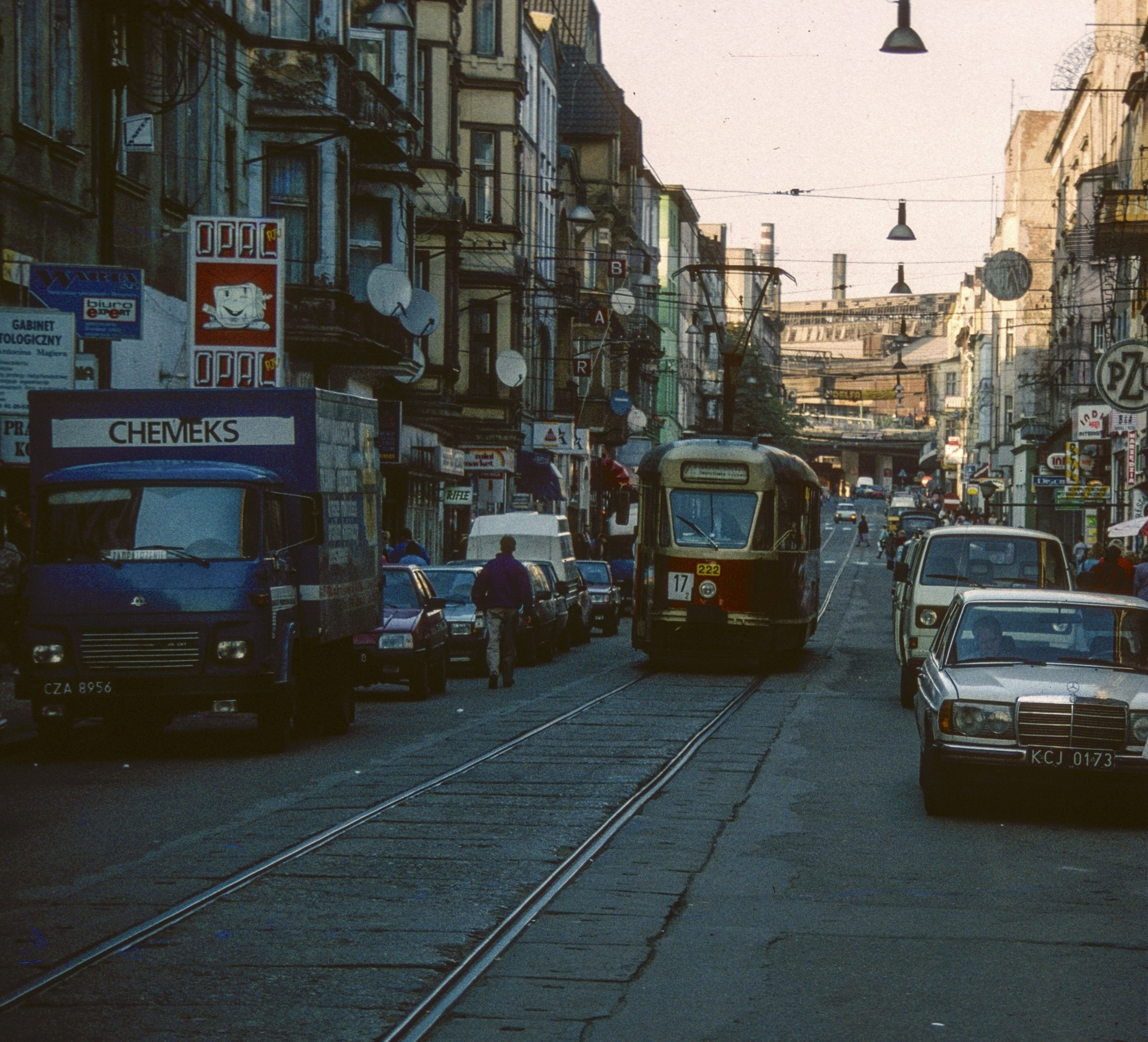
A Chorzów street in 1993

At the end of World War II, Chorzów was given to Poland. Generally, the Chorzów industry suffered little damage during World War II due to its inaccessibility to Allied bombing, a Soviet Army enveloping manoeuvre in January 1945, and perhaps Albert Speer's slowness or refusal to implement the scorched earth policy. This intact industry now played a critical role in the post-war reconstruction and industrialization of Poland. After the war, businesses were nationalized and operated, with minor changes, until 1989. Some were used as Soviet labour and concentration camps. Some industrial hardware and at least 100,000 Polish Silesians were deported to the Ukrainian Donbass region. At the "fall of communism" in 1989, the area was in decline. Since 1989, the region has been transitioning from heavy industry to a more diverse economy.

In 1954 as many as 103 miners died in the "Barbara-Wyzwolenie" coal mine disaster.

On 28 January 2006, a roof collapsed at an exhibition hall, killing 65 people.

In 2007, Chorzów became a part of the Upper Silesian Metropolitan Union (predecessor to the Metropolis GZM), a voluntary union of a continuous chain of cities aimed at increasing the poor visibility of the area, improving its competitiveness, and modernizing the infrastructure.

The region experienced several waves of migrations, including those commencing in 1945 (to Germany and from Poland and Ukraine), in 1971–1976 (to Germany), in 1982 (to Western countries), and from 2003 (to other countries of the EU).

== Geography ==
=== Location ===
Chorzów within the Metropolis GZM.

Chorzów is in the middle of the largest urban center in Poland. The Metropolis GZM is the largest legally recognized urban entity in Poland with a population of two million.

Nine million people live within 100 kilometres (62 miles) of Stadion Śląski in Chorzów. Six European capitals are located within 600 km (373 mi): Berlin, Vienna, Prague, Bratislava, Budapest and Warsaw.

=== Climate ===
The average annual temperature in Chorzów is 7.9 °C (46.2 °F). The annual precipitation is 723 mm (28 in). Weak West winds (less than 2 m/s) prevail.

== Demographics ==
Detailed data as of 31 December 2021:

Description	All		Women		Men	
Unit	person	percentage	person	percentage	person	percentage
Population	105268	100	55516	52.7%	49752	47.3%
Population density	3166.9		1670.1		1496.8	

== Economy ==
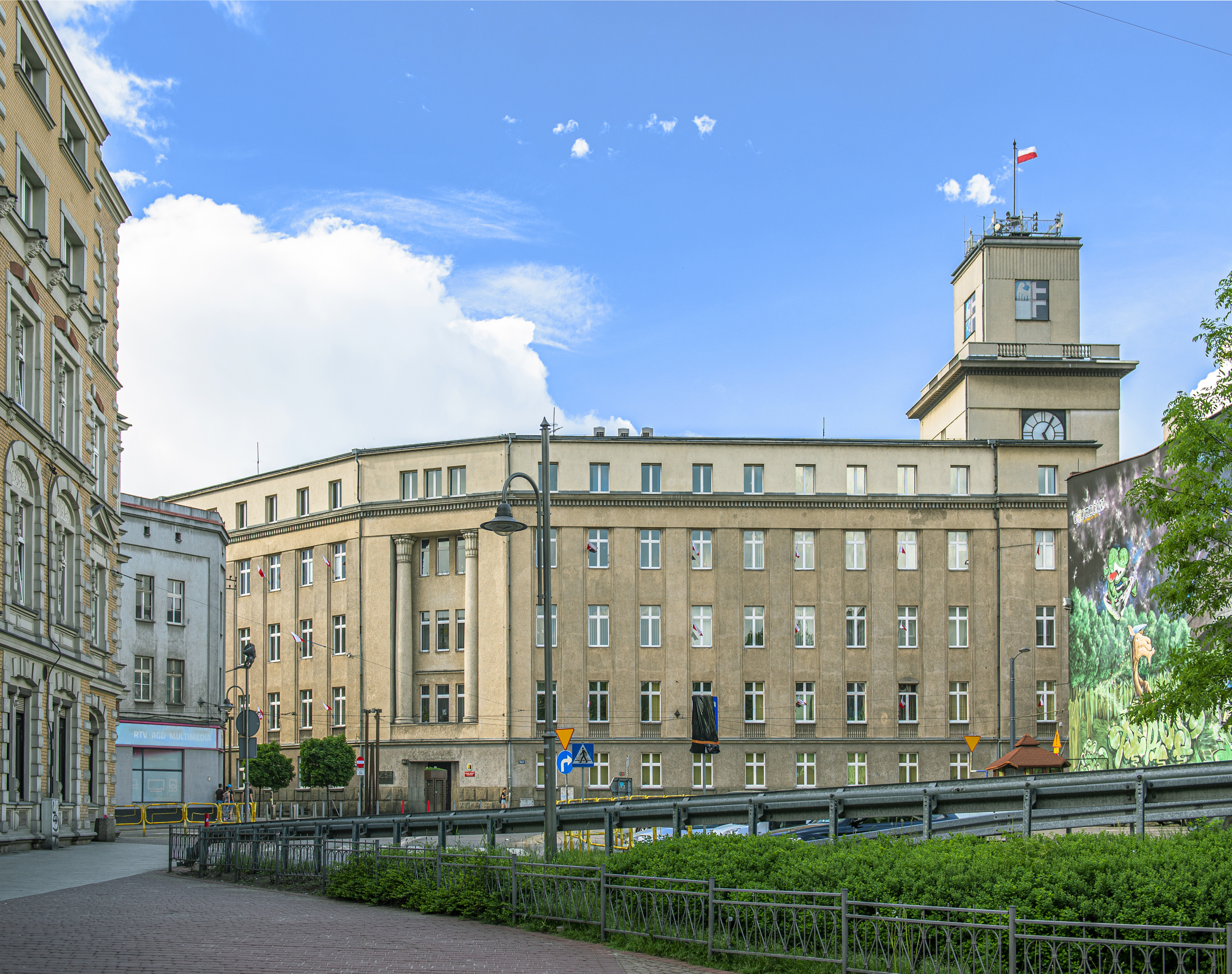
Chorzów Town Hall

Chorzów used to be one of the most important cities in the largest Polish economic area (the Upper Silesian Industry Area) with extensive industry in coal mining, steel, chemistry, manufacturing, and energy sectors. Many heavy-industry establishments were closed or scaled down in the last two decades because of environmental issues in the center of a highly urbanized area, and also because of decades-long lack of investment. Others were restructured and modernized. Wedged between a dozen of other cities, the population has been decreasing. The city character has been evolving towards the service economy as new industrial development takes mostly place at the border of the industrial area. The unemployment rate is high (12.6% on 2007-12-31) but decreasing; the workforce is generally highly technically skilled.

Major industrial establishments are:

- Huta Batory – steel
- Huta Kościuszko SA – steel
- Chorzów Power Station
- Zakłady Chemiczne Hajduki SA – carbochemistry
- Zakłady Azotowe SA – nitrogen fixation and methanol
- Alstom-Konstal – transport manufacturing and construction
- KWK Polska Wirek, rejon Prezydent – coal mine
- ProLogis – logistics
- Messer – technical gases

== Transport ==
Subdivisions of Chorzów

Car:

- Freeway A4: from German Autobahn A4 at Görlitz/Zgorzelec to Wrocław-Gliwice-Chorzów (Batory)-Katowice-Kraków (and towards Ukraine)
- Express Route (DTŚ): Katowice-Chorzów-Ruda Śląska-Zabrze
- National Route DK79: Katowice-Chorzów-Bytom

Three railway stations on two major routes:

- Katowice-Chorzów Batory-Gliwice
- Katowice-Chorzów Batory-Chorzów Miasto-Chorzów Stary-Bytom

Air:

- Katowice International Airport

Public transport:

- Chorzów is well connected within the Katowice urban area with bus lines and tram lines. Silesian Interurbans is one of the largest streetcar systems in the world, in existence since 1894. The system spreads for more than 50 km (31 mi) (east-west) and covers the following cities: Będzin, Bytom, Chorzów, Czeladź, Dąbrowa Górnicza, Gliwice, Katowice, Mysłowice, Ruda Śląska, Siemianowice Śląskie, Sosnowiec, Świętochłowice, and Zabrze. Part of the public transport system provided by Metropolis GZM is metropolitan bicycle system MetroBike, operated by Nextbike which has 924 stations with over 7000 bicycles in Chorzów and in surrounding cities. Rides under 30 minutes costs PLN 1, less than 1 hour costs PLN 2.50 and each additional hour becomes more expensive.

== Higher education ==
Within the city limits of Chorzów:

- University of Silesia (Uniwersystet Śląski), two faculties
- WSB Merito Universities – WSB Merito University in Chorzów (Wyższa Szkoła Bankowa)
- Górnośląska Wyższa Szkoła Pedagogiczna (Upper-Silesian Teachers College)
- Górnośląska Wyższa Szkoła Przedsiębiorczości im. Karola Goduli (Karl Godulla Upper-Silesian Higher Business School)
- Śląska Wyższa Szkoła Informatyki (Silesian Higher School of Information Technology)
- Numerous general and technical high schools

The nearby cities of Katowice and Gliwice are far larger academic centers than Chorzów.

== Sights ==
=== Architecture ===
- St Hedwig's Church
- St Barbara's Church
- Saint Mary Magdalene's Church
- Saint Mary's Church
- Saint Joseph's Church
- Main post office
- Municipal Savings Bank Building

=== Industrial heritage ===
- Museum of metallurgy in the former power station of the Royal Iron Works
- Headframe of the closed President coal mine

=== Silesian Central Park ===
The nationally known Silesian Central Park covers about 30% of the city area and features:

- Silesian Zoological Garden
- Stadion Śląski, the largest sports stadium in Poland
- Planetarium and Astronomical Observatory
- A large rose-exhibition garden (7 hectares, 385 varieties of roses)
- Legendia Theme Park
- Upper Silesian Ethnographic Park
- International Exhibition Grounds
- A swimming-pool complex
- A water sports center
- A tennis court complex
- Green areas

Chorzów also features other notable nature areas, including:

- nature-landscape protected area "Żabie Doły" (at the border with Bytom and Piekary Śląskie),
- nature-landscape protected area of "Uroczysko Buczyna" (at the border with Katowice and Ruda Śląska),
- aquatic complex "Amelung".
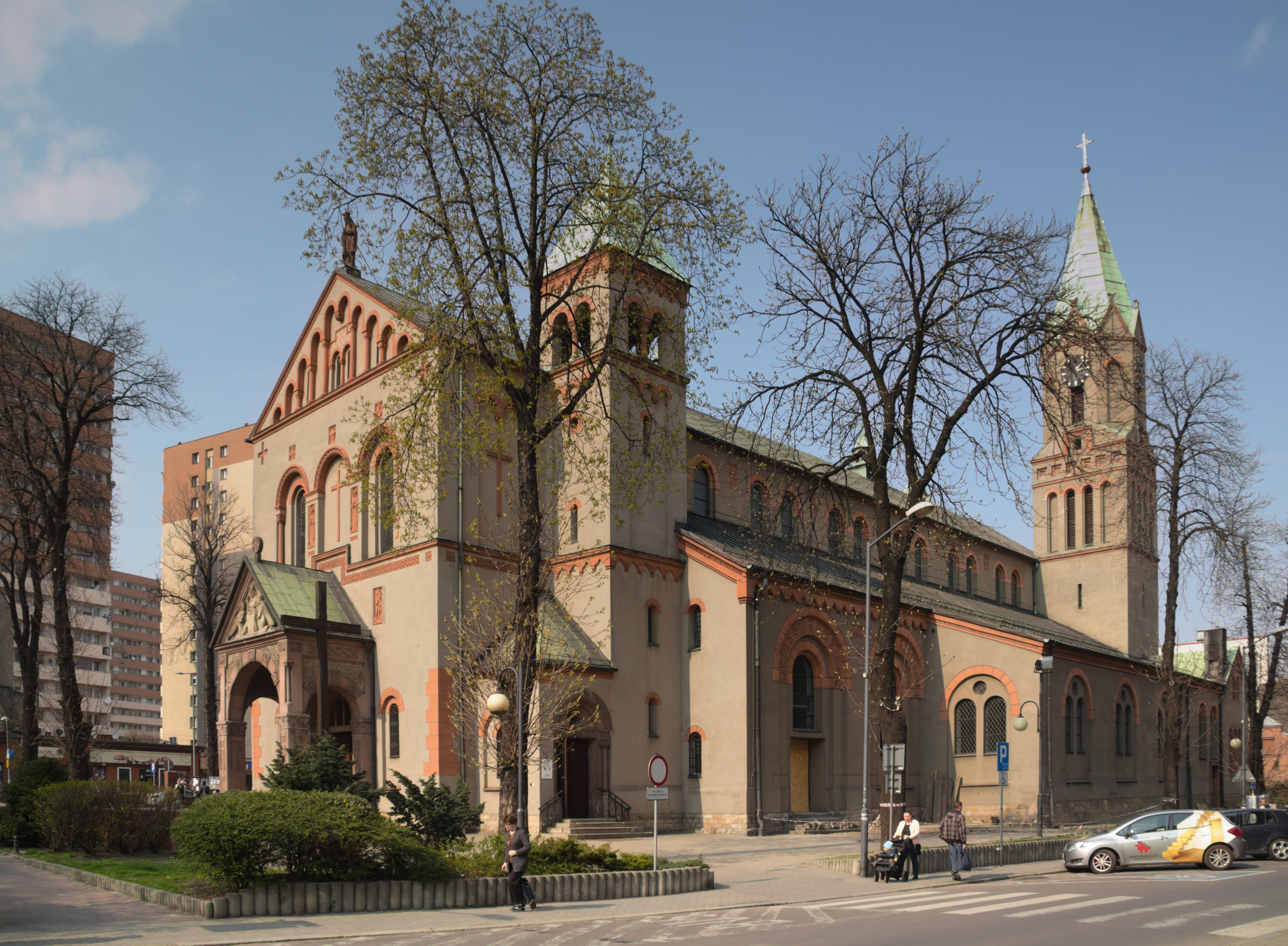
St Hedwig's Church

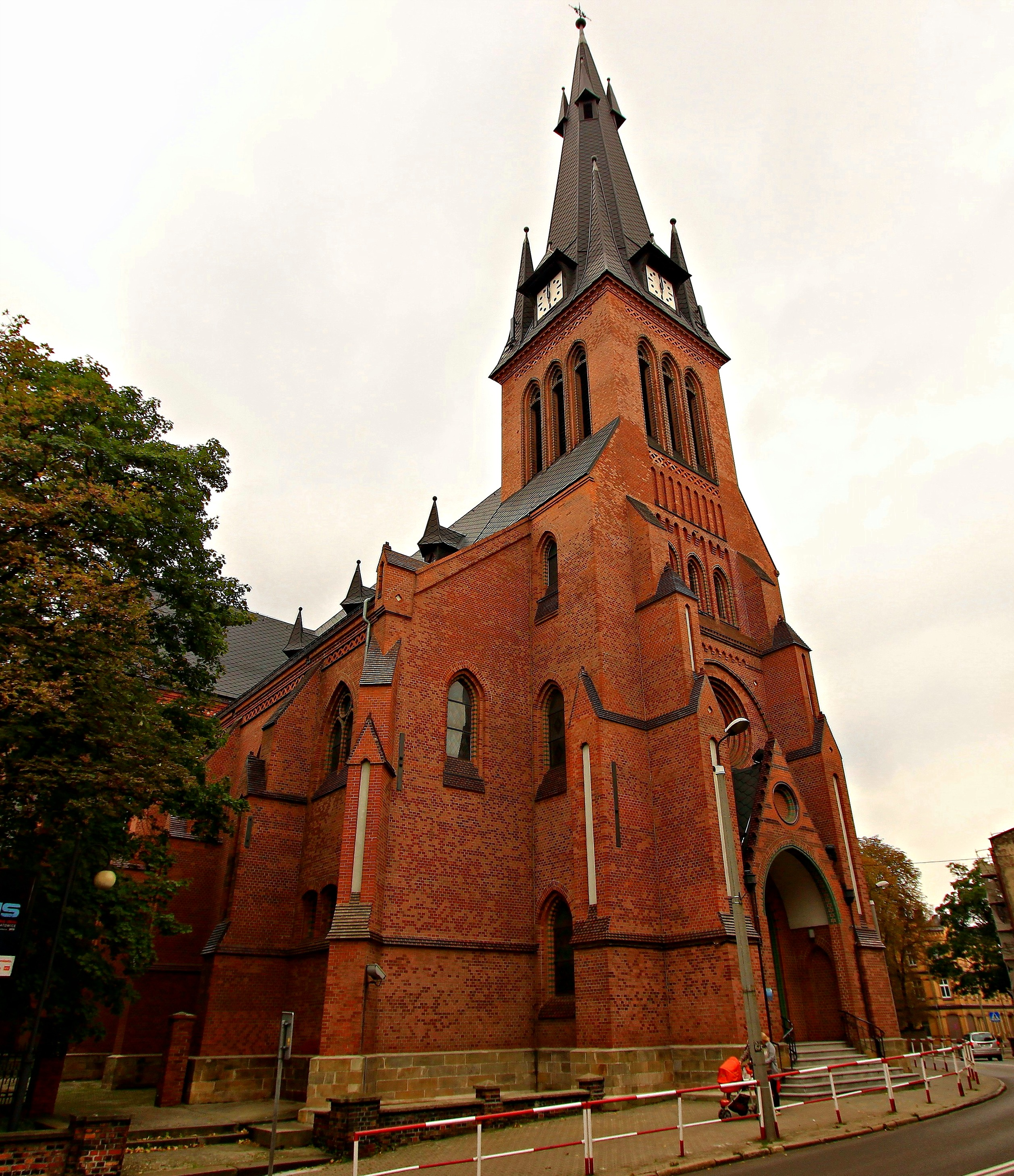
Saint Mary Magdalene's Church

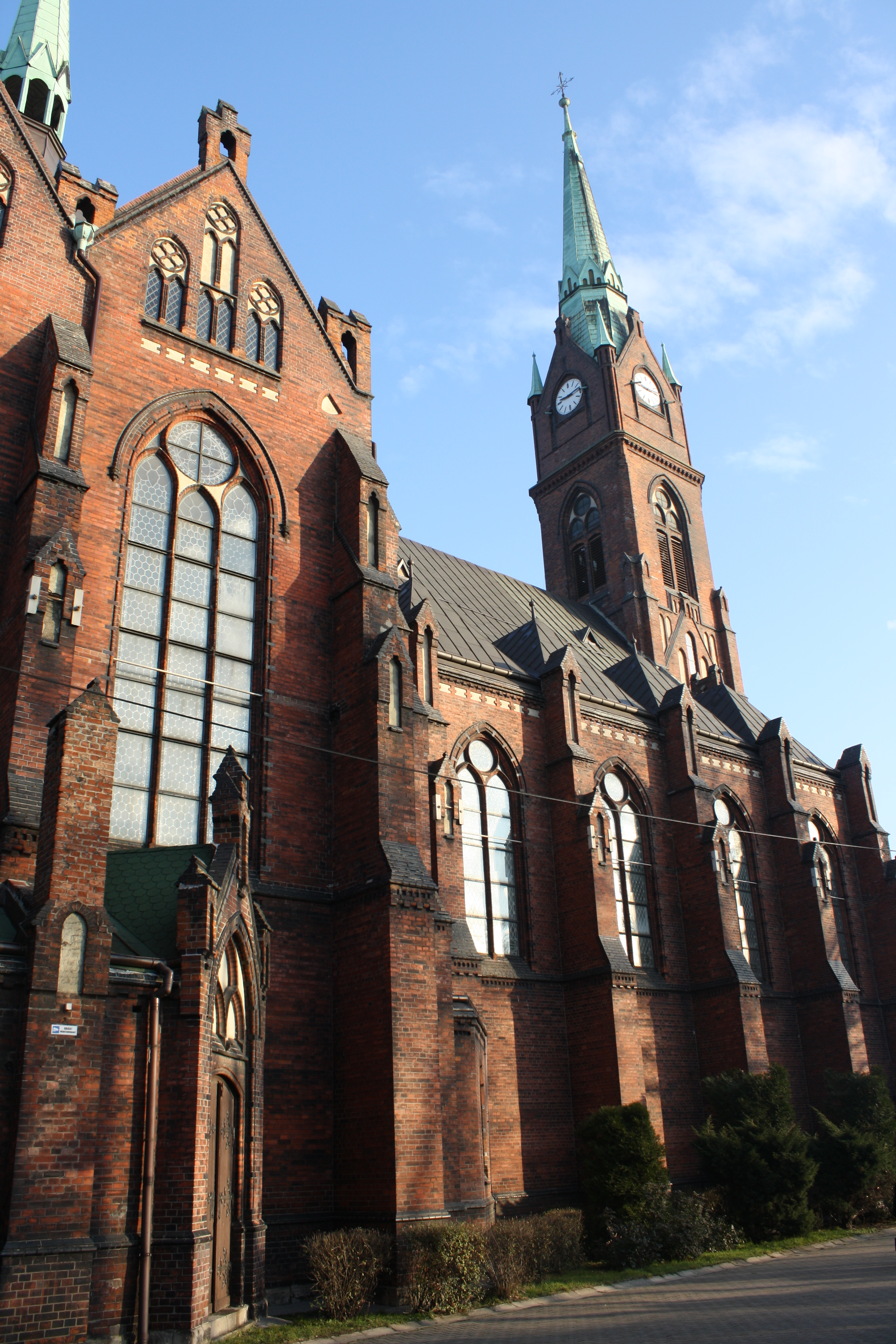
Saint Mary's Church

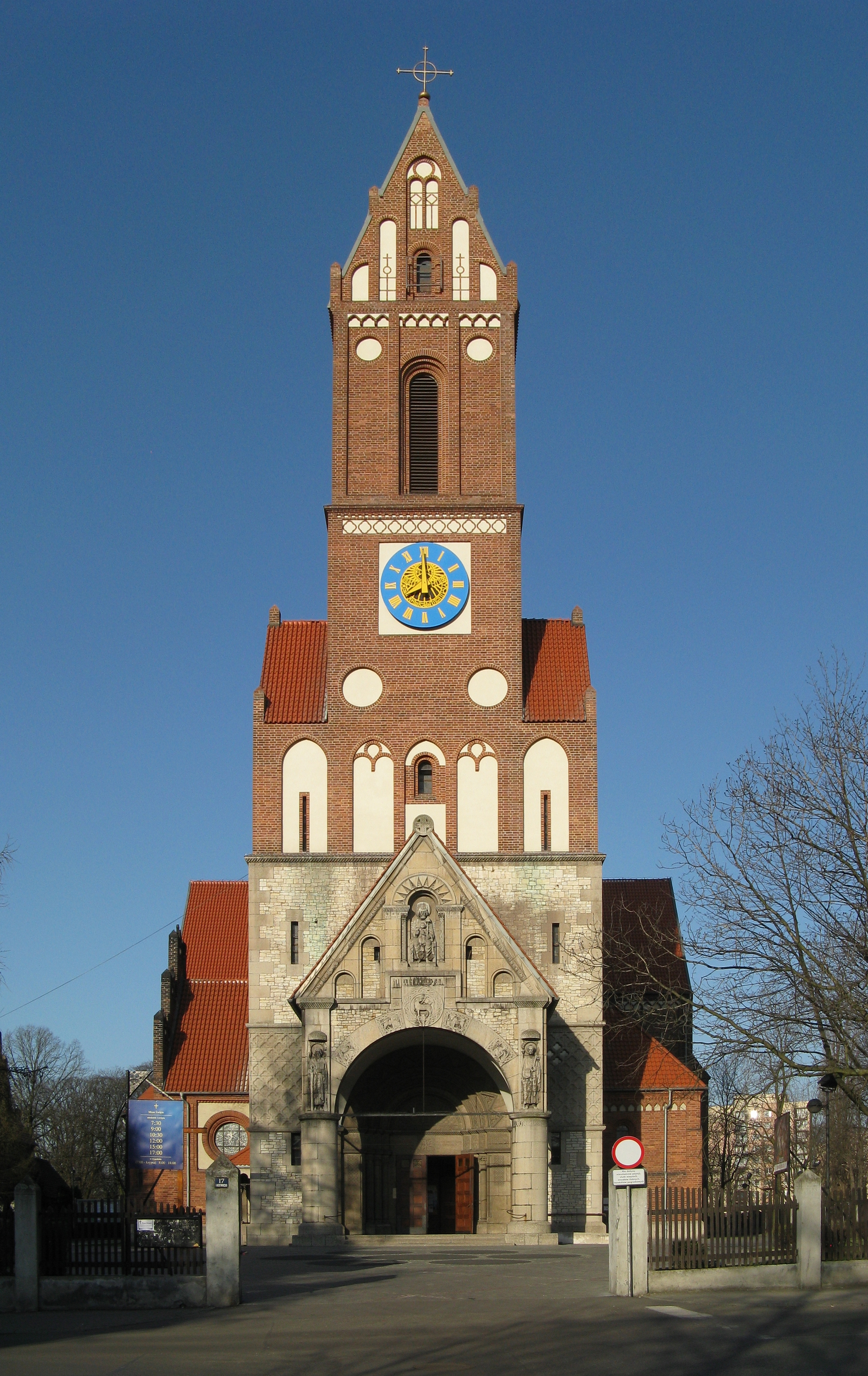
Saint Joseph's Church

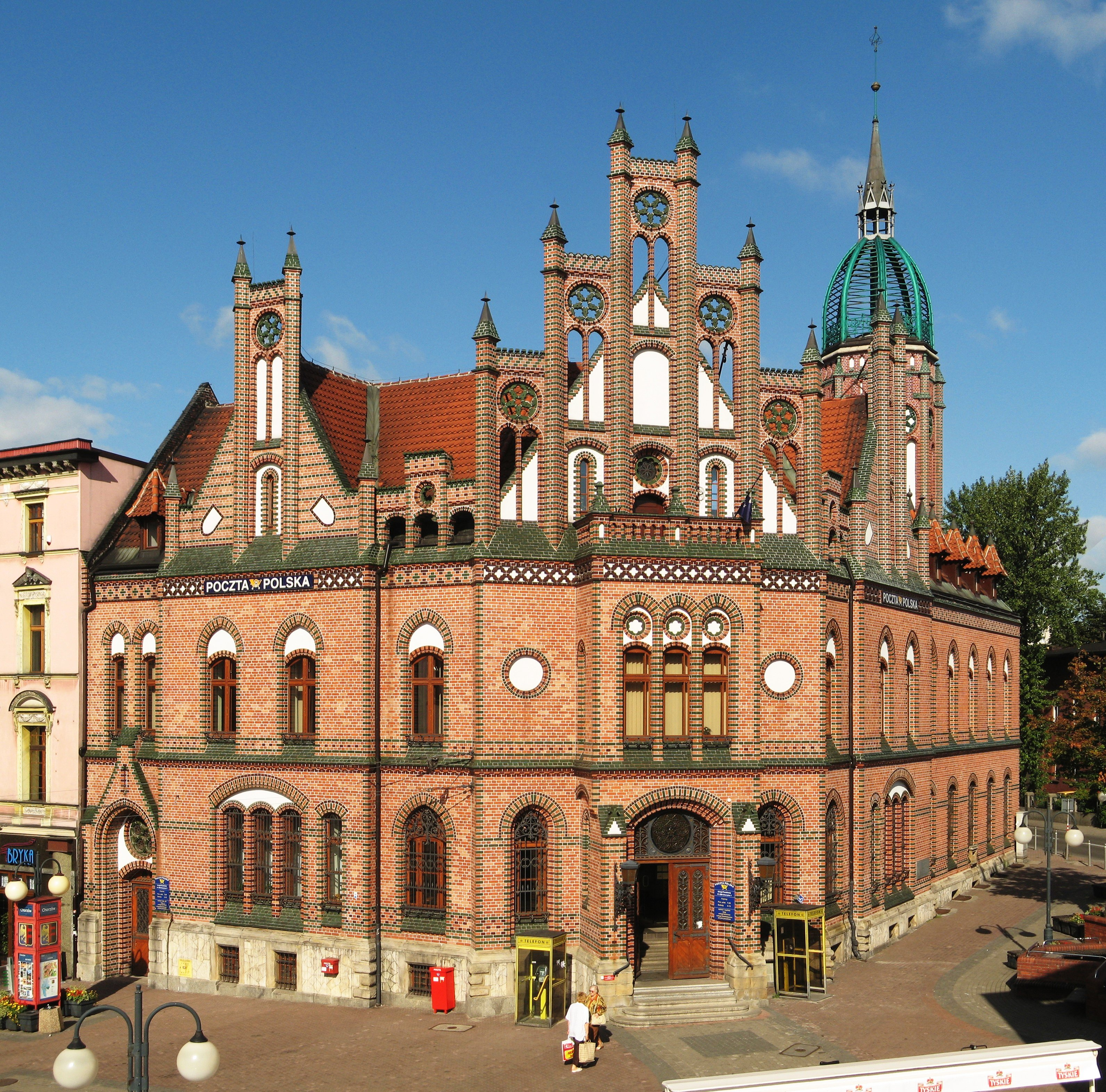
Main post office

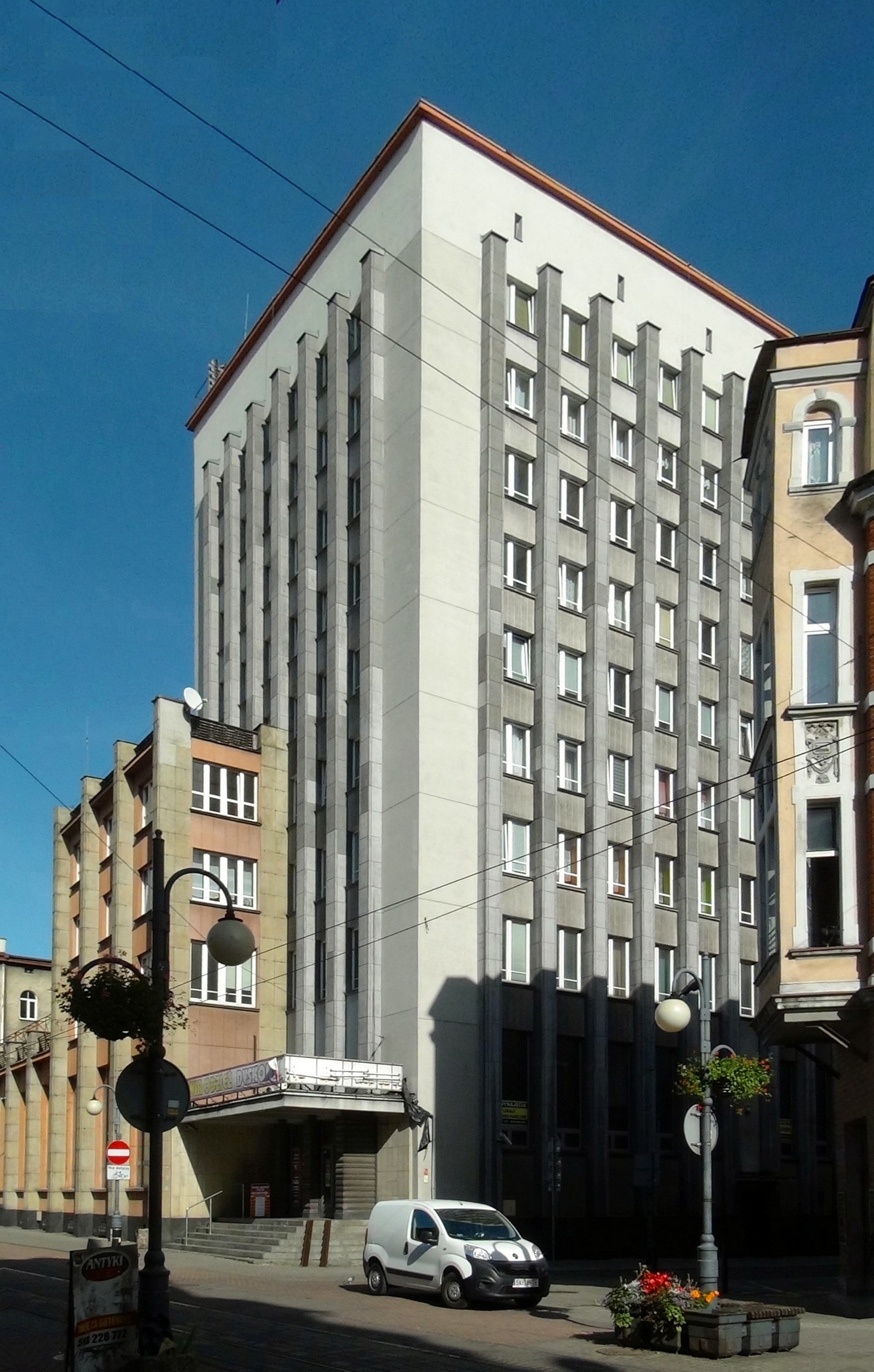
Municipal Savings Bank Building

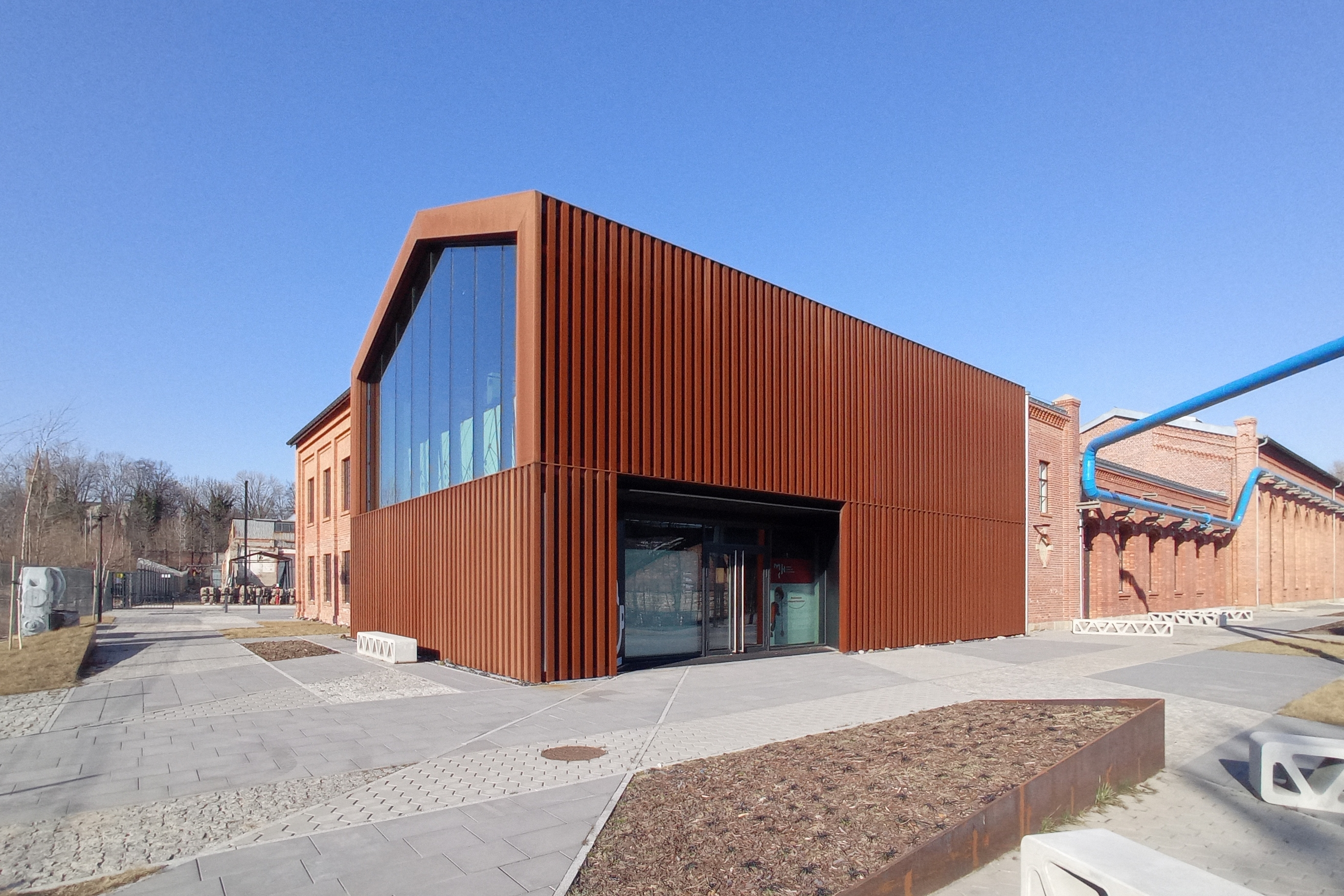
Museum of metallurgy in the former power station of the Royal Iron Works

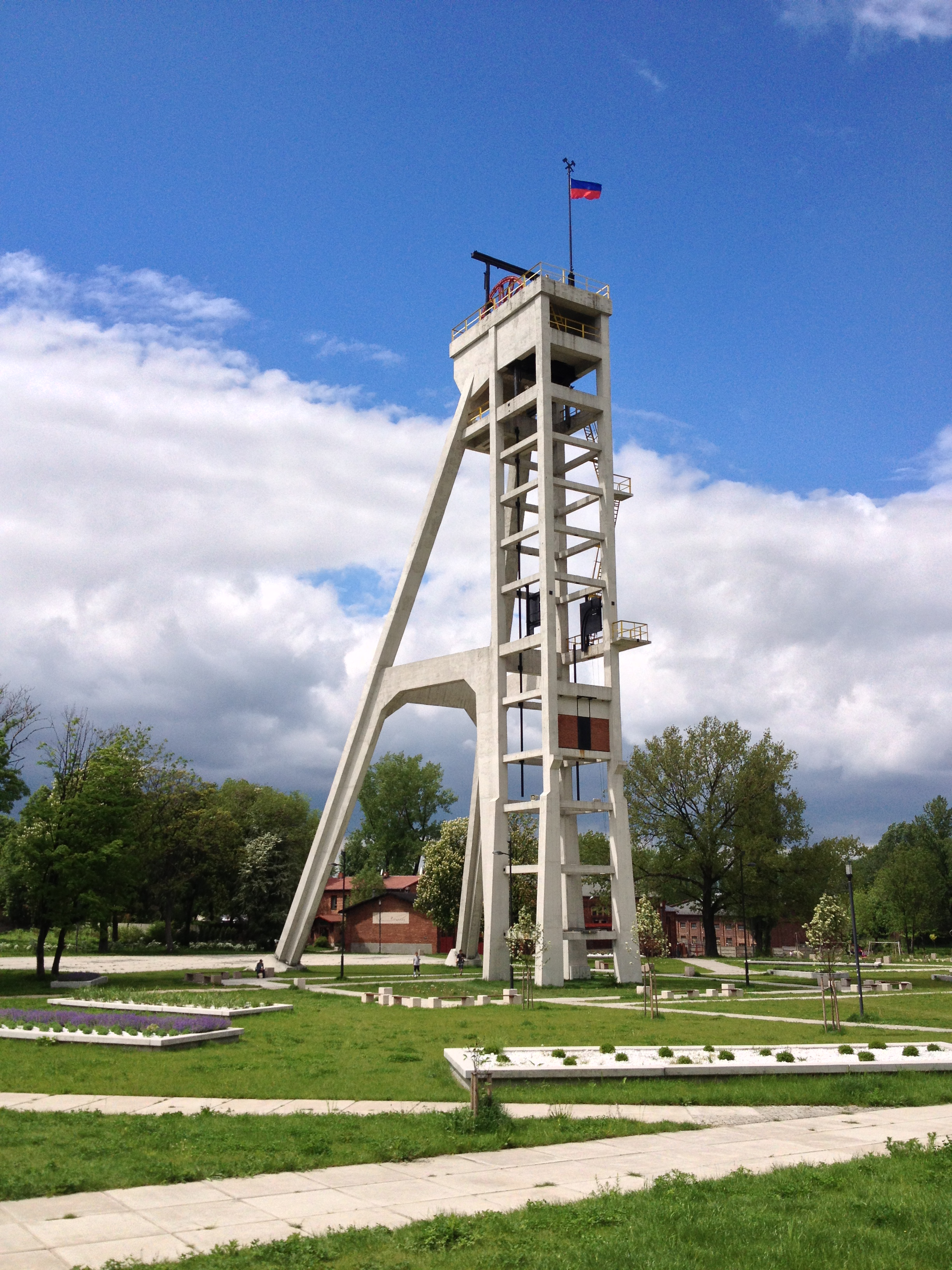
Headframe of the closed President coal mine

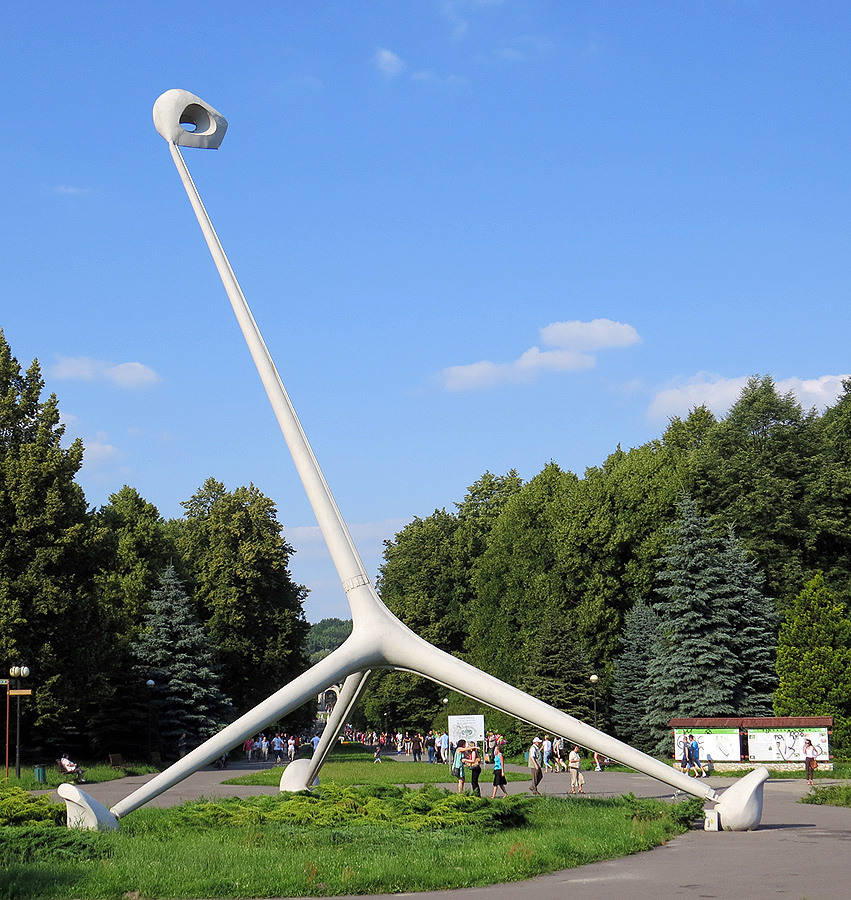
The Giraffe, a sculpture at the Silesian Park

== Sports ==
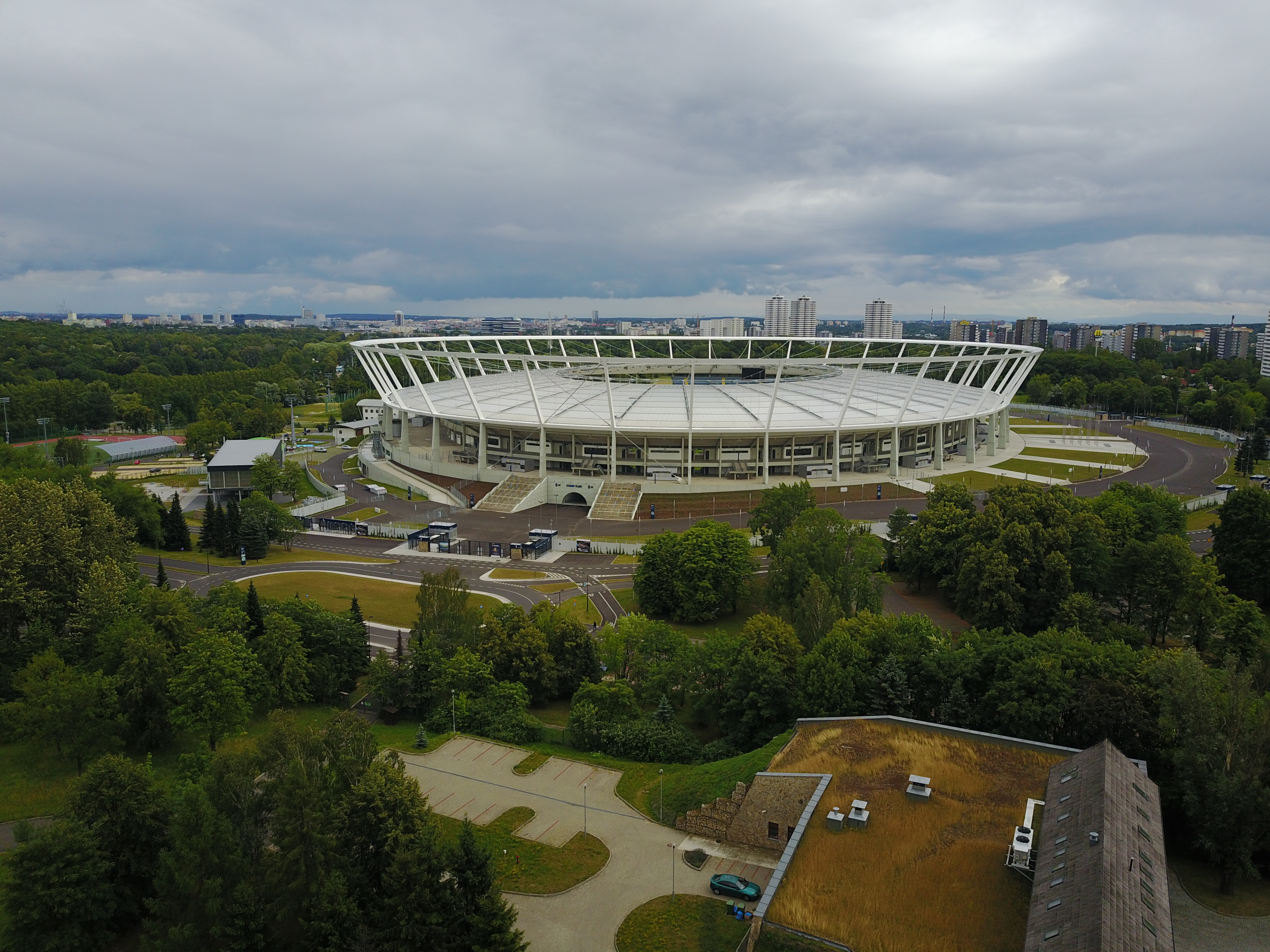
Stadion Śląski, the second biggest stadium in Poland

Clubs:

- Ruch Chorzów – a men's football team (14 time national champion, 3-time winner of the Polish Cup), and female handball team (9 time national champion).
- Alba Echo Chorzów – men's basketball team (2nd division)
- SCS Sokół Chorzów – women's volleyball team (B division, 6th place in 2003/2004)
- Clearex Chorzów – 5-player football team (Polish Cup winner, 1st division, 2nd in 2003/2004)

Historically notable is the former club AKS Chorzów.

Stadion Śląski is a former home stadium for the Poland national football team, and used for international football games and other events (for example, it has held the Speedway World Championships four times, with the 1973 World Final attracting over 120,000 spectators, the world record attendance for Motorcycle speedway). From year 2009 have held there track and field competitions. Kamila Skolimowska Memorial, which was part of the inaugural meeting World Athletics Continental Tour in 2020 and Diamond League series since 2022. At the 2024 edition of the meeting, two world records were set, one by Jakob Ingebrigtsen (3000m 7.17,55) and the other by Armand Duplantis (pole vault 6.26, just 20 days after last set up in Olympic Games). The stadium also hosts large music concerts. Throughout its history it has featured such artists and groups as The Rolling Stones, Metallica, Guns N' Roses, AC/DC, U2, Iron Maiden, Linkin Park, Pearl Jam, Red Hot Chili Peppers, Genesis and The Police.

== Notable people ==
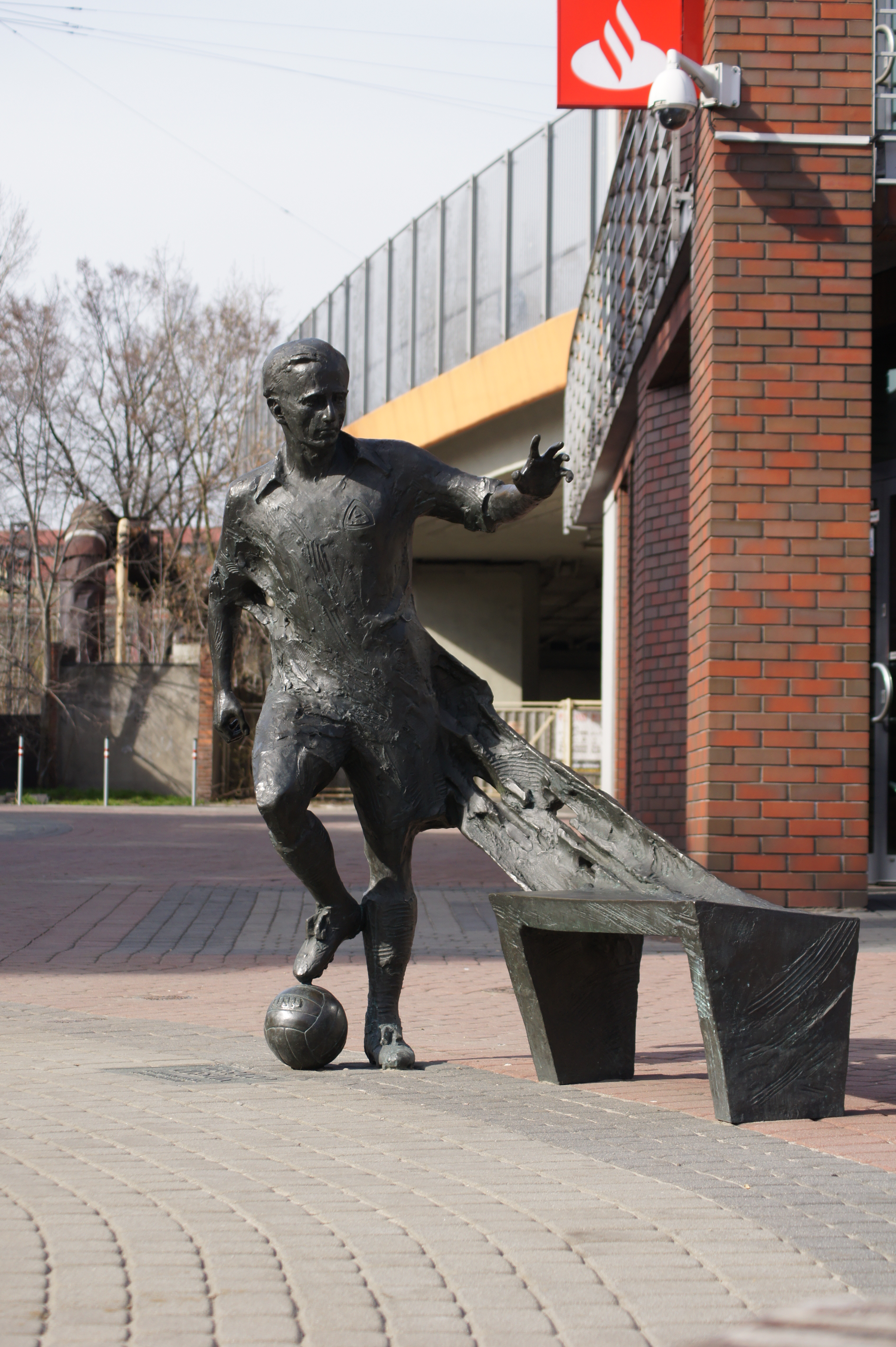
Statue of footballer Gerard Cieślik in Chorzów

=== Born in Chorzów ===
- Kurt Alder (1902–1958), German chemist, Nobel Prize in chemistry
- Reinhard Appel (1927–2011), German journalist and television presenter
- Gerard Cieślik (1927–2013), Polish footballer
- Marcin Dylla (born 1976), Polish classical guitarist
- Jakub Dziółka (born 1980), Polish former footballer
- August Froehlich (1891–1942), German Roman Catholic priest, member of the resistance against Nazism and martyr
- Karolina Gluck, Polish victim of the 7/7 Bombing in London on 7 July 2005 (killed on the Number 30 bus at Tavistock Square)
- George Golla (born 1935), Australian jazz musician
- Monika Hojnisz (born 1991), biathlete
- Szymon Kapias (born 1984), Polish footballer
- Agnieszka Krukówna (born 1971), actress
- Marek Kubisz (born 1974), Polish footballer
- Olgierd Łukaszewicz (born 1946), Polish actor
- Janusz Michallik (born 1966), former American national team soccer player, currently a commentator for ESPN
- Walter Mixa (born 1941), Bishop of Augsburg and military Bishop of the Bundeswehr
- Helga Molander (1896–1986), German actress, and mother of Hans Eysenck
- Paul Mross or Paweł Mróz (1910–1991), Polish and German chess player
- Leonard Piątek (1913–1967), Polish soccer star of the interbellum period
- Antoni Piechniczek (born 1942), Polish soccer coach (lead twice the national team at World Cup)
- Ladislaus Pilars de Pilar (1874–1952), Polish poet and entrepreneur
- Ryszard Riedel (1956–1994), blues rock vocalist
- Günther Rittau (1893–1971), German cameraman and film director
- Oskar Seidlin (1911–1984), American scholar
- Tino Schwierzina (1927–2003), last mayor of East Berlin
- Hanna Schygulla (born 1943), German actress and chanson singer
- Stephan Stompor (1931–1995), musicologist
- Adam Taubitz (born 1967), German jazz and classic musician
- Franz Waxman (1906–1967), American composer
- Friedrich Weißler (1891–1937), lawyer
- Gerard Wodarz (1913–1982), Polish soccer star of the interbellum period

=== Associated with Chorzów ===
- Friedrich Wilhelm von Reden (1752–1815), German pioneer in mining
- John Baildon (1772–1846), Scottish pioneer in metallurgy
- Adolph Menzel (1815–1905), German artist
- Ignacy Mościcki (1867–1946), Polish chemist and then President of Poland
- Fritz Haber (1868–1934), German chemist
- Eugeniusz Kwiatkowski (1888–1974), eminent Polish economist and politician
- Joe Wickham (1890–1968), Irish sportsperson
- Ernest Wilimowski (1916–1997), Silesian soccer star
- Jerzy Buzek (born 1940), Prime minister of Poland, former President of the European Parliament
- Aleksandra Gajewska (born 1971), theatre director, actress, and politician.

== Twin towns – sister cities ==
Chorzów is twinned with:

- Creil, France
- Iserlohn, Germany
- Ózd, Hungary
- Termoli, Italy
- Ternopil, Ukraine
- Zlín, Czech Republic
