= Żabie Doły =

Coordinates: 50°19′57″N 18°57′32″E

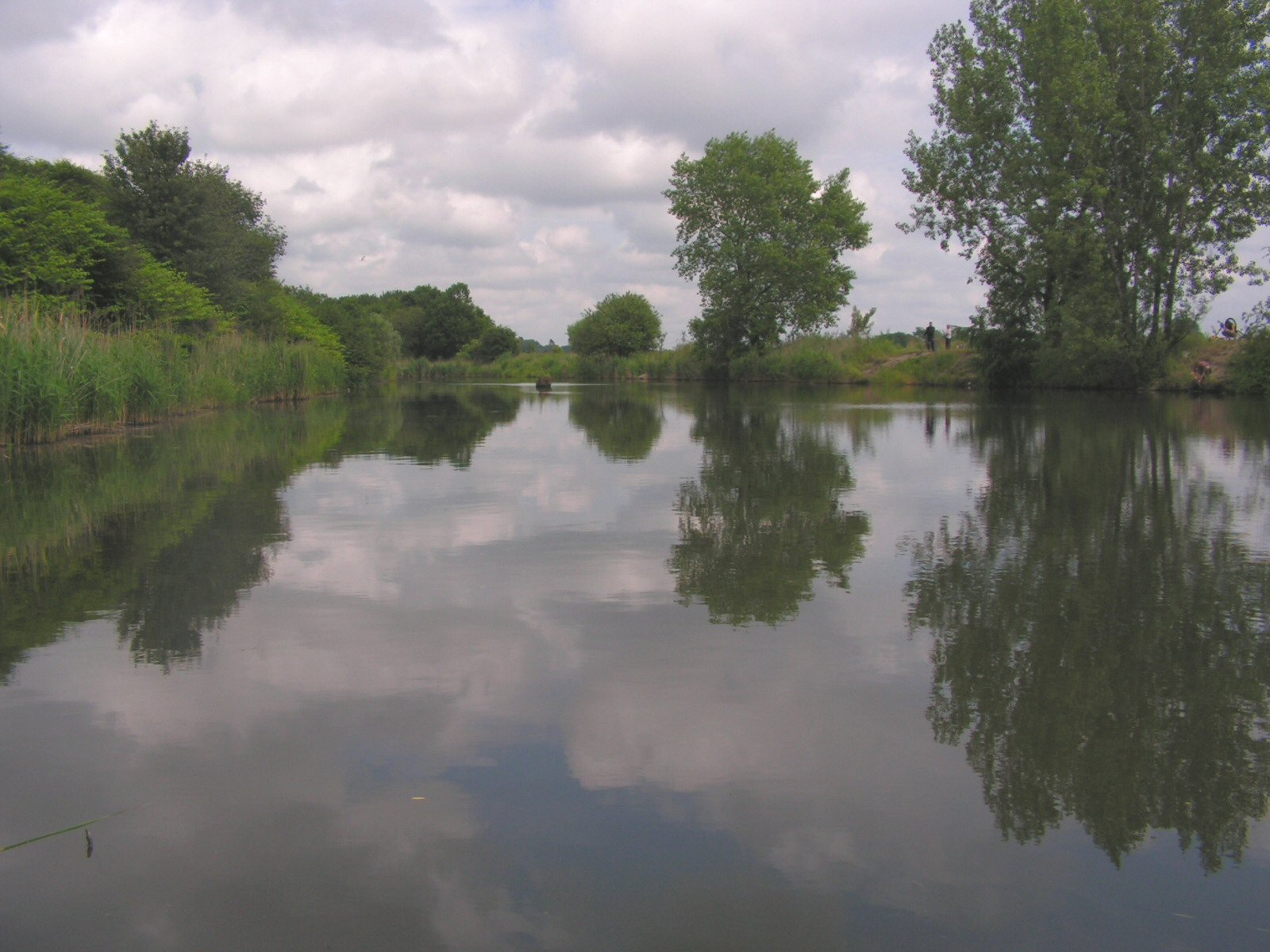
The "Żabie Doły" protection area in Bytom

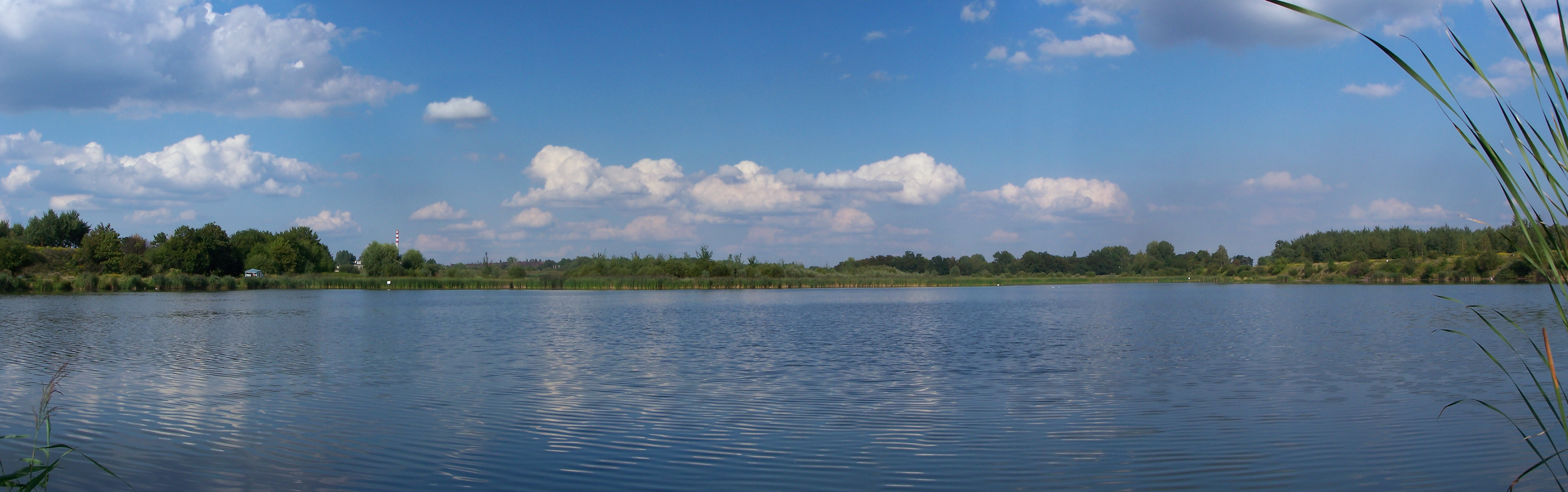
Panorama of Żabie Doły

Żabie Doły is a nature and landscape protected area in Silesia, Poland. The Żabie Doły complex is located entirely within the Metropolis GZM and encompasses land heavily altered by human activity. The protected area covers 2.262 km² . At Żabie Doły, 129 species of birds have been identified, including 70 nesting species and 17 species rare in the region. Other fauna and flora is also well represented.

The name ""Żabie Doły" can be roughly translated as "Frog Ditches".

== Location and history ==
The Żabie Doły conservation area is located entirely within the limits of the cities of Bytom, Chorzów and Piekary Slaskie in the center of the highly urbanized region of Upper Silesia.

Many centuries of human activity, in particular underground mining and metal smelting, left the area covered with unused water retention pools, post-mining sinkholes, tailings and slag heaps. The local mining included zinc, lead, and hard coal. The majority of the land transformation by the humans occurred in the 1950s. The discovery of its current biological richness was a surprise.

The area received the legally-protected status in 1997, partially due to the interest of high-school students (from high schools in Bytom and Louisenlund, Germany).

== Legal status ==
The Żabie Doły area has currently a status of the "nature and landscape complex" within the legal framework of the protected areas of Poland. Currently, efforts are under way to further upgrade the status to that of a nature reserve.

== Railroad accident ==
On the day of 14th April 1988 here on the former track Pole Północne – Maciejkowice of the former Górnośląskie Koleje Wąskotorowe (Upper-Silesian narrow-gauge railways) at track-km 12,850 an accident has occurred where a train fell of the embankment which was undermined by floating water due to a clogged culvert. The crew of the involved locomotive Lxd2-362 consisting of the engineer and his helper got injured.

== Literature ==
- Krzysztof Soida (1996). Koleje wąskotorowe na Górnym Śląsku (in Polish). Vol. I. Katowice: Śląsk. ISBN 83-85831-82-7.
