= Szymon Kapias =

Polish footballer

Personal information
- Full name: Szymon Kapias
- Date of birth: 12 June 1984 (age 42)
- Place of birth: Chorzów, Poland
- Height: 1.82 m (5 ft 11 1/2 in)
- Position: Defender

Team information
- Current team: AKS Mikołów
- Number: 15

Youth career
- Ruch Chorzów

Senior career*
Years	Team	Apps	(Gls)
2003–2004	Górnik Zabrze II		
2004–2006	Źródło Kromołów		
2006–2008	GKS Katowice	48+	(1+)
2008	→ Lech Poznań (loan)	0	(0)
2009–2012	Zagłębie Lubin	18	(0)
2012–2017	Rozwój Katowice	95	(3)
2017–2019	Przemsza Siewierz	65	(2)
2021–2022	Tęcza Błędów	34	(0)
2022–	AKS Mikołów	51	(3)
- * Club domestic league appearances and goals as of 17 June 2024

Szymon Kapias (born 12 June 1984) is a Polish footballer who plays as a defender for AKS Mikołów.

== Career ==
He is a trainee of Ruch Chorzow. In January 2009 he joined Zagłębie Lubin.

== Honours ==
AKS Mikołów

- Regional league Silesia IV: 2023–24

== Notes ==
- Szymon Kapias at 90minut.pl (in Polish)
