= Post Office Building, Chorzów =

Post Office Building in Chorzów
- Polish: Gmach poczty w Chorzowie
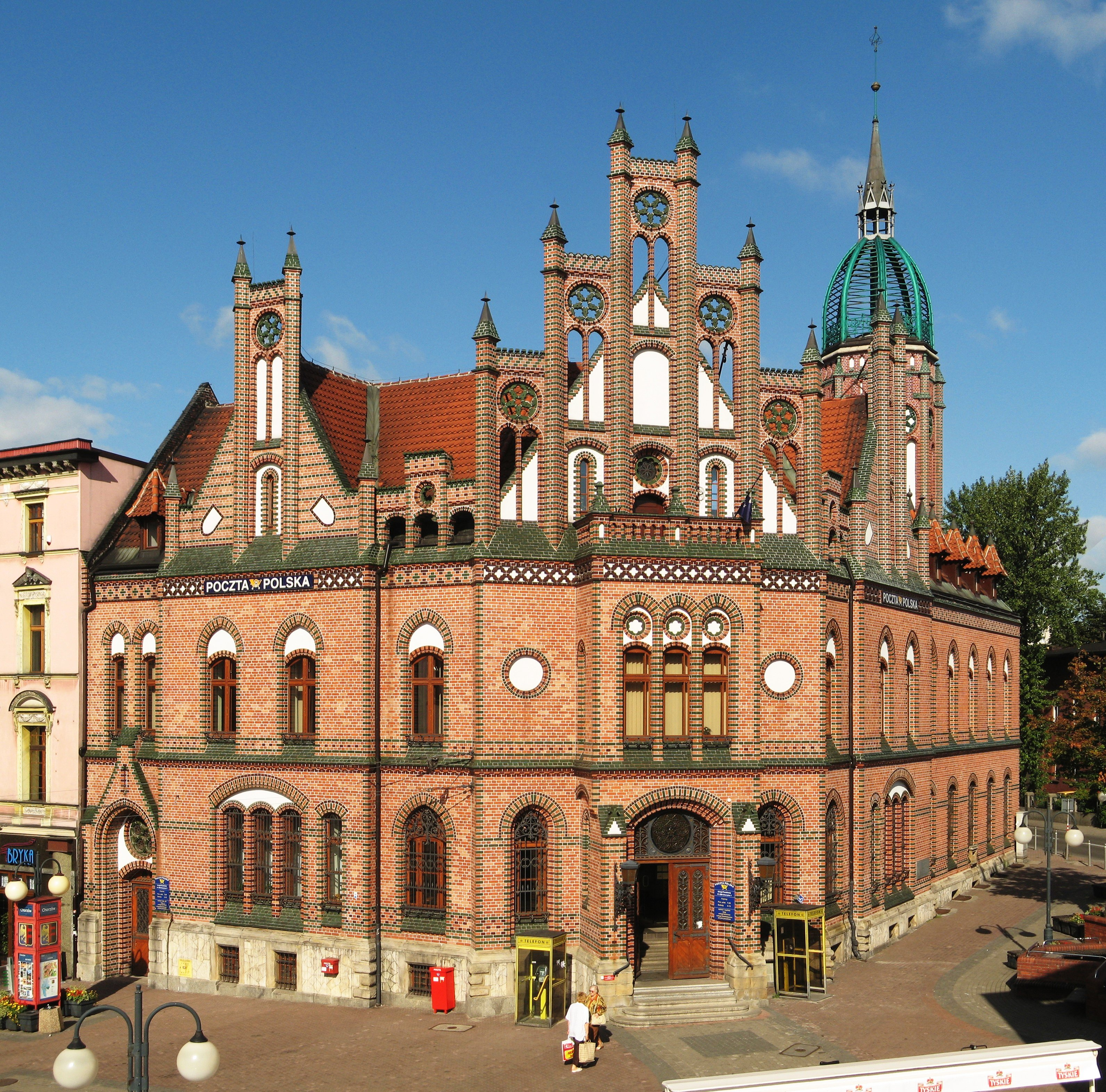
- Post office building in Chorzów, view from the east (before 2007)
- Interactive map of the Post Office Building in Chorzów area

General information
- Type: Public service building
- Architectural style: Neogothic
- Location: ul. Wolności 2, Chorzów, Poland
- Coordinates: 50°17′56″N 18°57′08″E
- Year built: 1891–1892

Technical details
- Floor count: 2

Design and construction
- Architect: Johann Schubert

The Post Office Building in Chorzów (Polish: Gmach poczty w Chorzowie) is a public-service building erected between 1891 and 1892 and expanded in 1911. It is located in Chorzów, Poland, and is listed in the register of immovable monuments of the Silesian Voivodeship.

== History ==
On 1 October 1885, the land for the construction of a post office was acquired from carpenter Carliczek. The building was constructed of brick between 1891 and 1892, based on a design by Johann Schubert, for the Imperial German Post Office (German: Kaiserlich Deutsches Postamt). In 1911, the building was expanded along present-day Pocztowa Street based on a design by F. Nhagen; with the added wing becoming known as the parcel hall (Polish: paczkarnia).

In the past, beneath the openwork dome, there was an overhead telecommunications system, with insulators being mounted on the ribs of the dome. The telephone network ran from the tower dome, while the switchboard was located in the building's basement. Similar layouts were employed in Breslau (present-day Wrocław) and Stralsund—being regarded as modern in the 19th century. Later, this communication system was replaced by cabled telephone lines. The building's façade was renovated in 2004.

== Architecture ==
A two-storey building erected on an irregular plan in a Neogothic style. Its roof multi-pitched with dormers, covered by roof tiles. The tower built on an octagonal plan, containing a staircase and topped by an openwork spire crowned with a finial. The façade is finished with clinker brick and green decorative elements, with projections: window openings varied in form, decorated alternately with red and green bricks, featuring wooden casement windows. The main entrance is located on a chamfered corner, in the form of an avant-corps with a large stepped and tracery gable. The remaining entrances are framed more modestly.

== Gallery ==
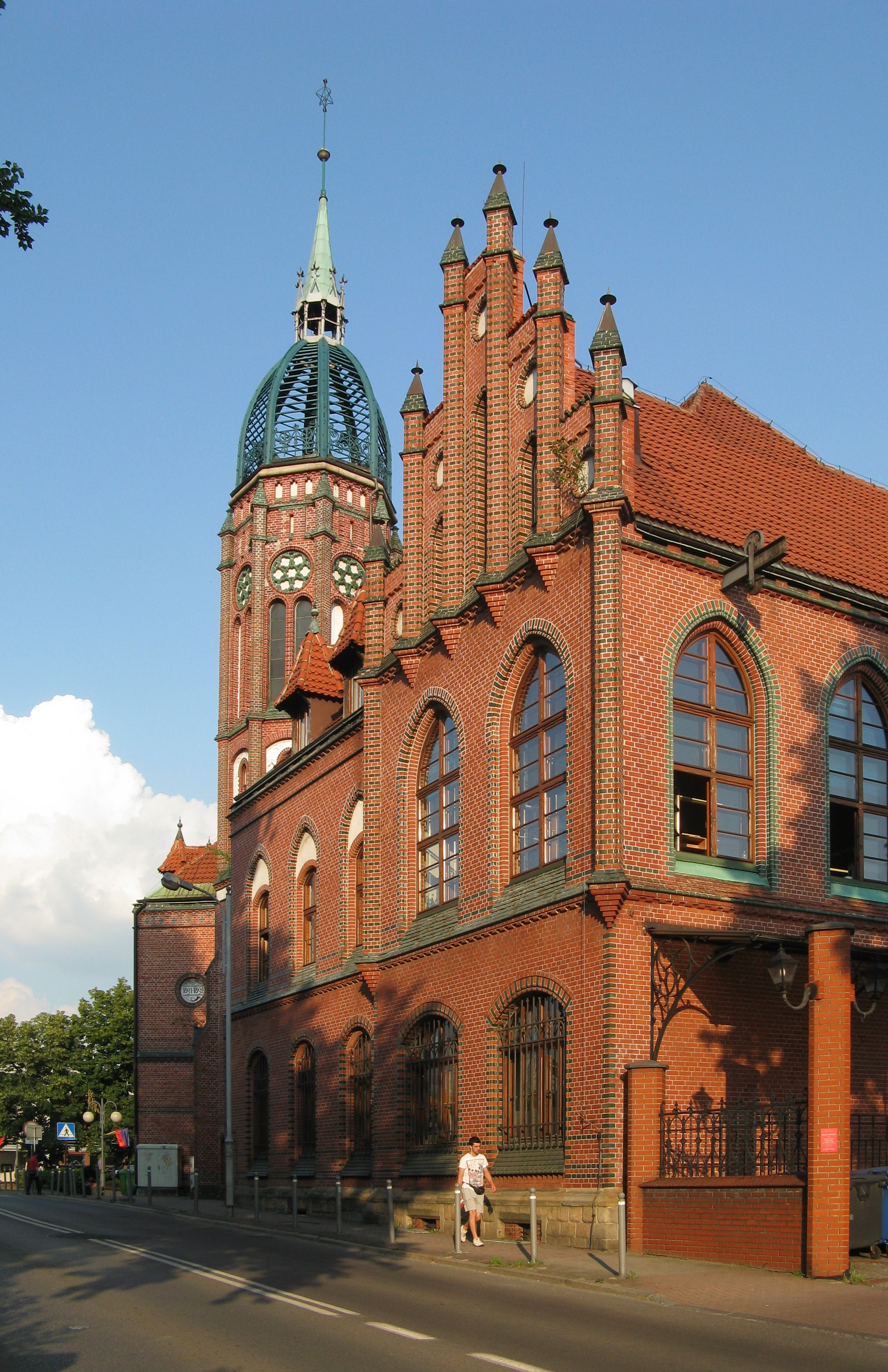
View from Pocztowa Street, featuring the 1911 extension (2018)

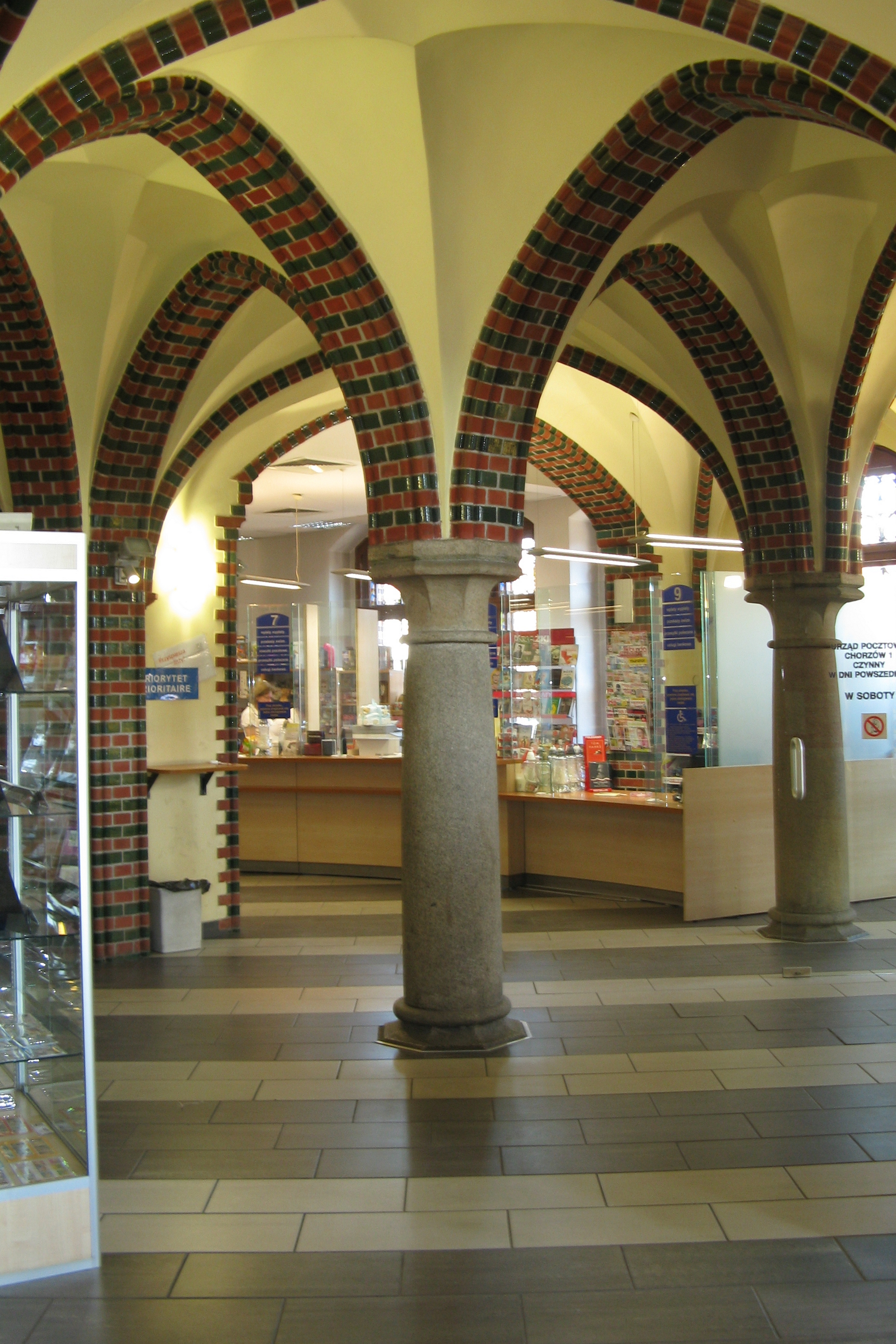
Interior, ground floor open to customers (2018)

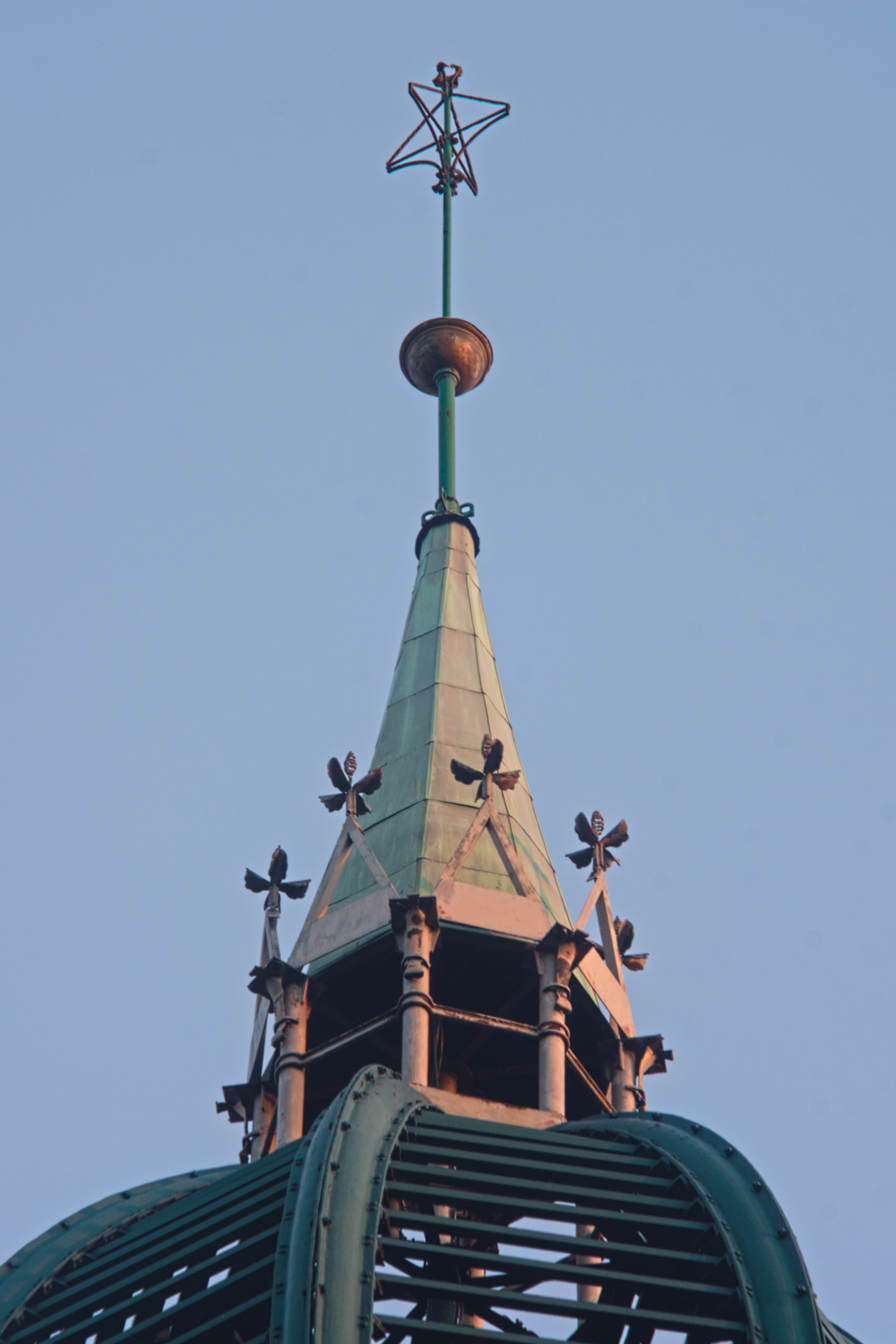
Top of the tower (2020)

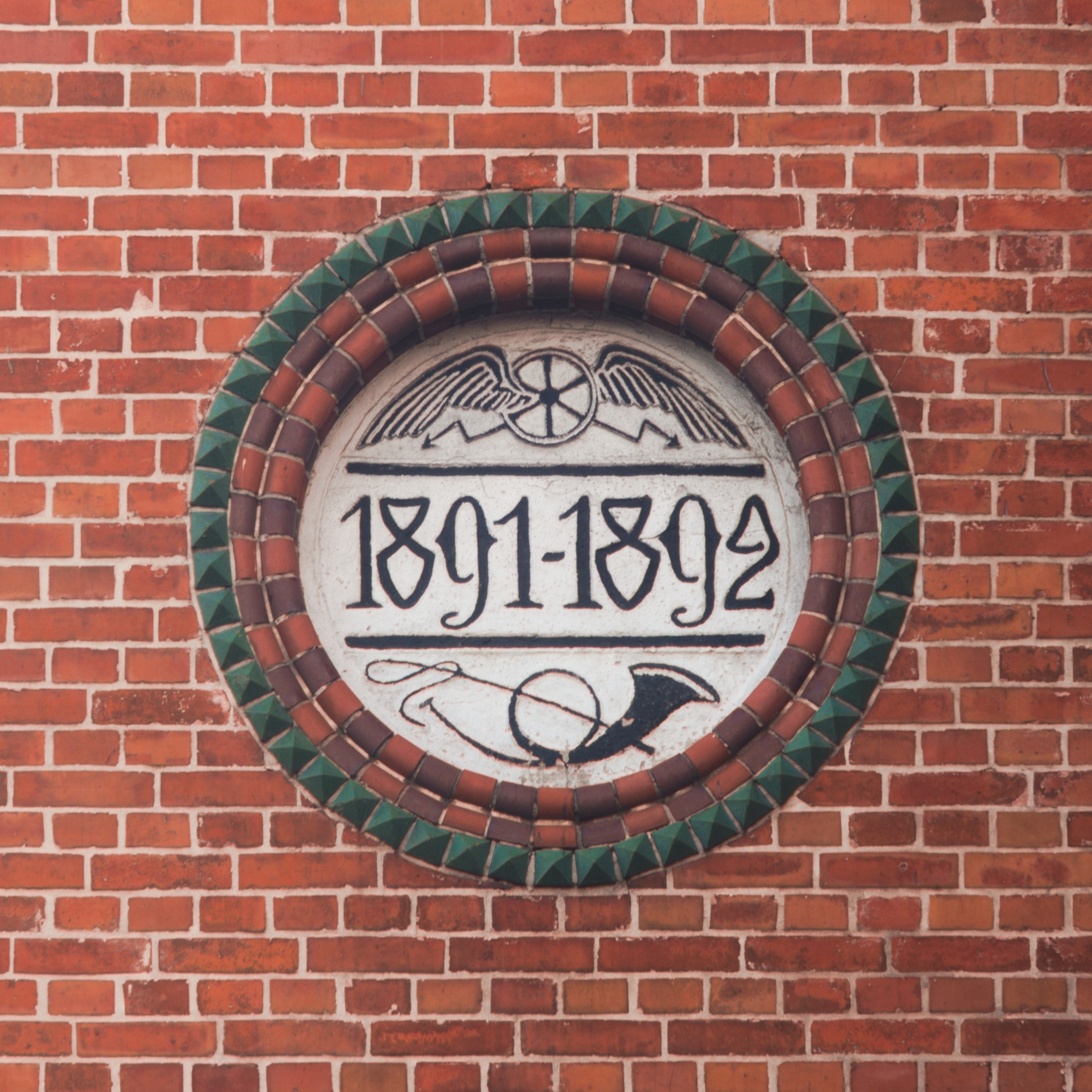
Construction date and postal emblems on the façade (2020)

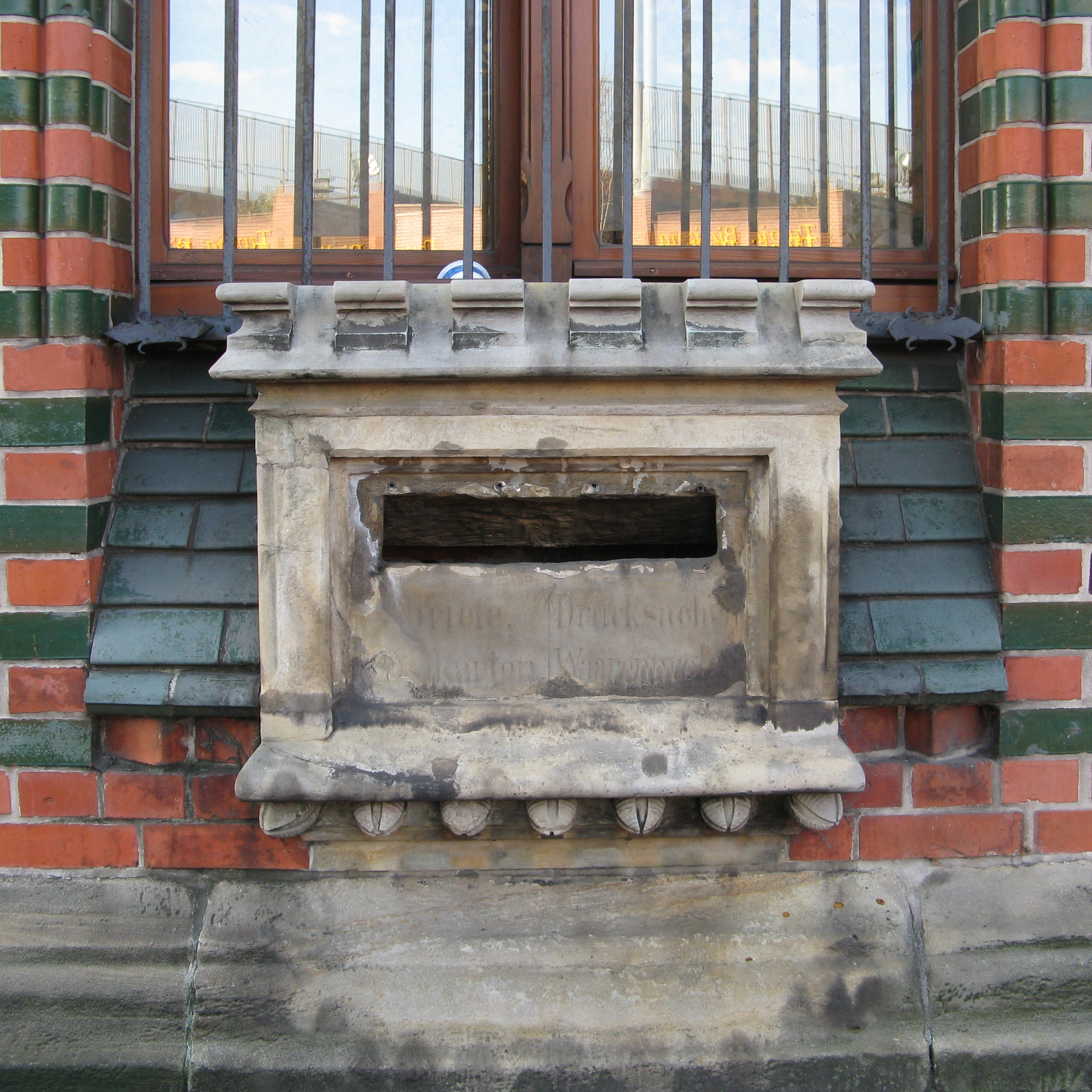
Mail slot with German inscriptions (2018)

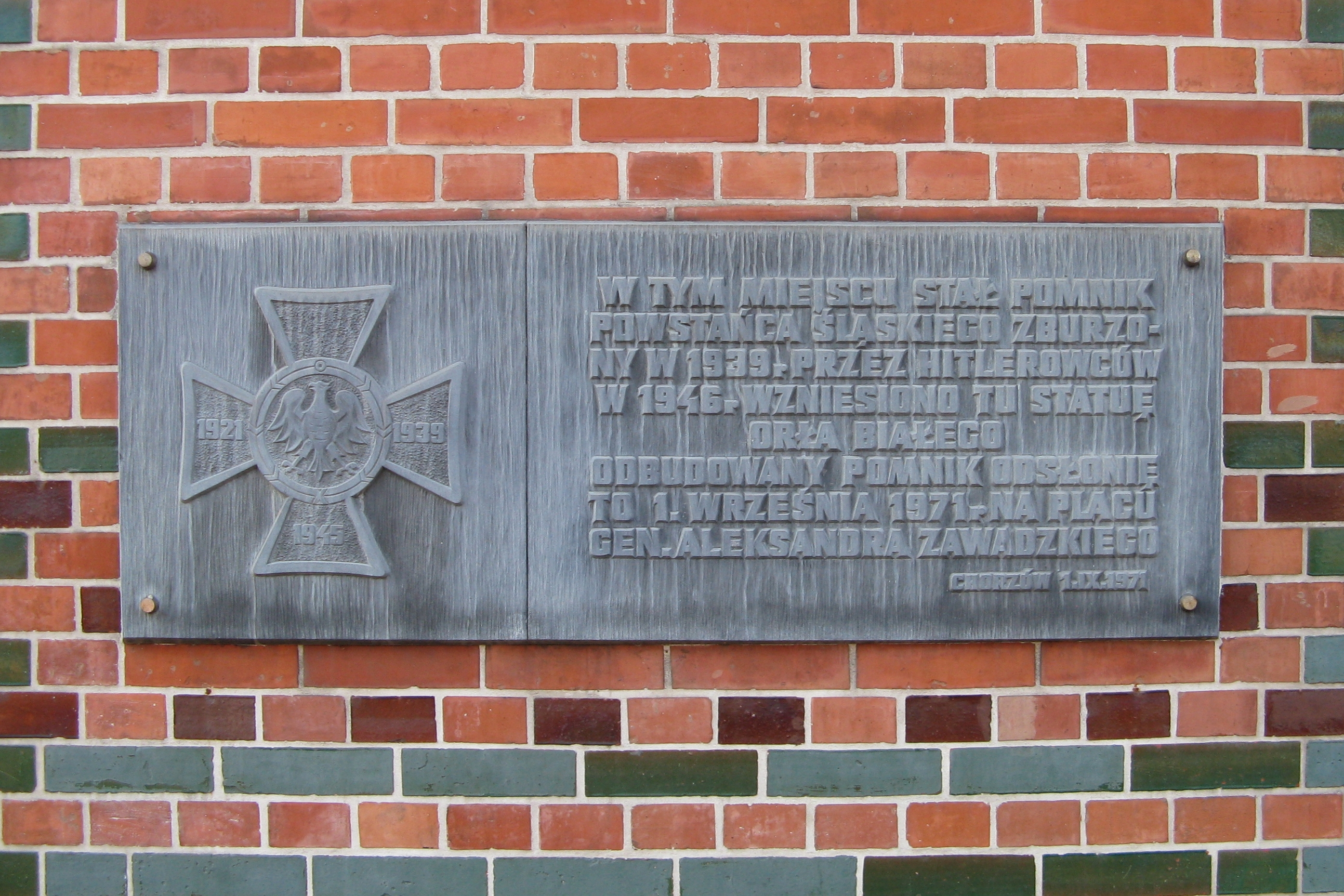
Commemorative plaque on the northeast façade (2018)
