= Chorzów Power Station =

Power station in Poland

Coordinates: 50°18′29″N 18°58′10″E

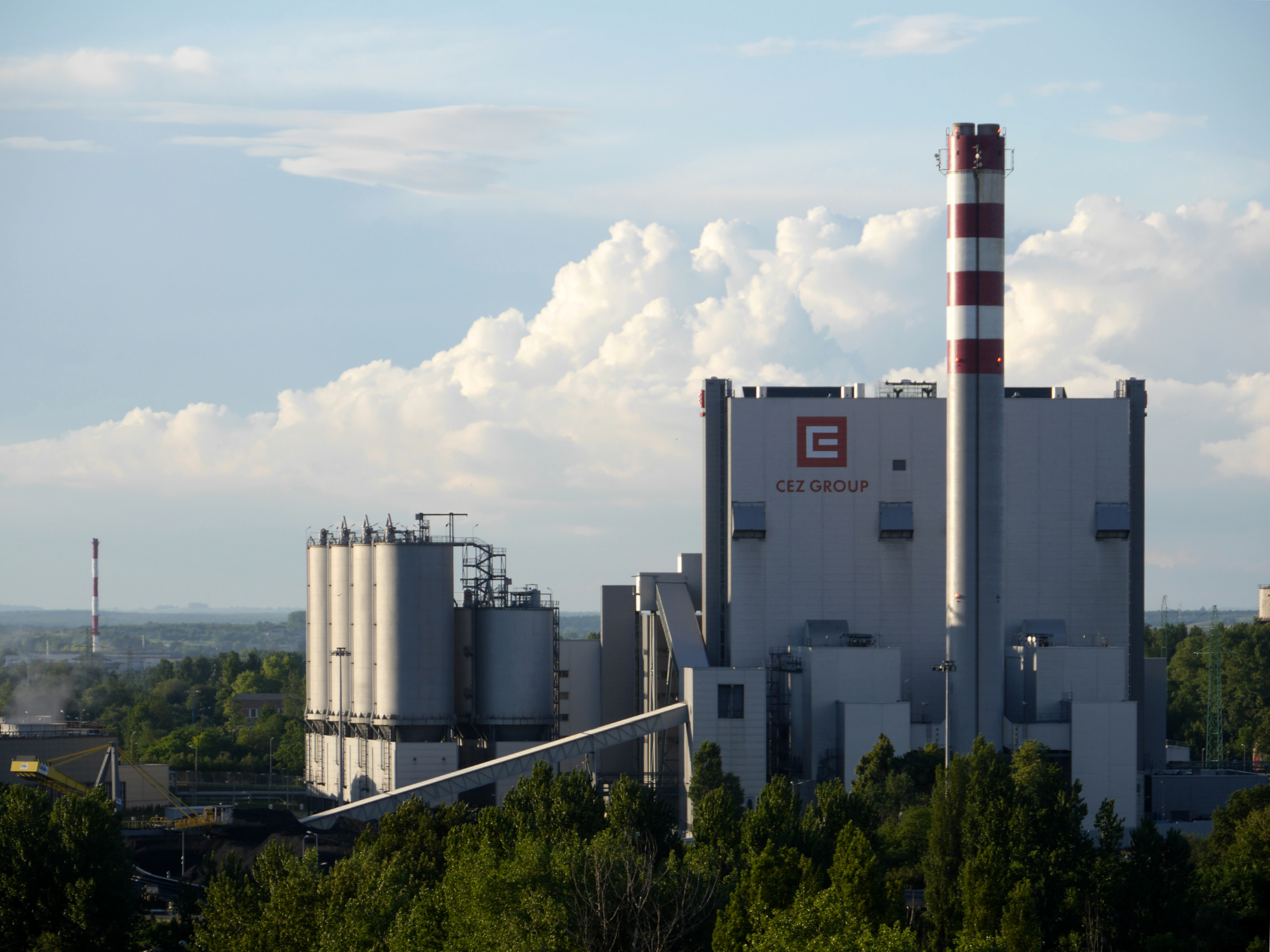
Chorzów Power Station

Chorzów power station is a thermal power plant located in Chorzów, Silesian Voivodeship, Poland. It has been in operation since 1898, since 2003 under the name Elcho.

Currently (2012), the plant produces electrical power (generating capacity of 204 MW) as well as heat (500 MW) for district heating, based on hard coal.

== Technical data ==
- Two blocks
- Steam flow: 119.1 kg/s per block
- Steam pressure: 13.59 MPa
- Steam temperature: 539 °C
