= Carbochemistry =

Branch of chemistry

Carbochemistry is the branch of chemistry that studies the transformation of coal (bituminous coal, coal tar, anthracite, lignite, graphite, and charcoal) into useful products and raw materials. The processes that are used in carbochemistry include degasification processes such as carbonization and coking, gasification processes, and liquefaction processes.

== History ==
The beginning of carbochemistry goes back to the 16th century. At that time, large quantities of charcoal were needed for the smelting of iron ores. Since the production of charcoal required large amounts of slowly-regenerating wood, the use of coal was studied. The use of pure coal was difficult because of the amount of liquid and solid by-products that were generated. In order to improve the handling the coal was initially treated as wood in kilns to produce coke.

Around 1684, John Clayton discovered that coal gas generated from coal was combustible. He described his discovery in the Philosophical Transactions of the Royal Society.

== See also ==
- Bergius process
- Clean coal technology
- Coal tar
- Fischer–Tropsch process
- Petrochemistry
- Synthetic Liquid Fuels Program
- Coking factory
