= Upper Silesian metropolitan area =

Upper Silesian metropolitan area may refer to:

- Metropolis GZM, also known as Metropolitan Association of Upper Silesia and Dąbrowa Basin, a metropolitan association of 41 contiguous municipalities in the central part of the Silesian Voivodeship, Poland
- Katowice metropolitan area, commonly known as Upper Silesian metropolitan area, a metropolitan area in the central part of the Silesian Voivodeship, Poland
- Katowice-Ostrava metropolitan area, also known as Upper Silesian polycentric metropolitan area, a broader polycentric metropolitan area, including, among others, the metropolitan areas of Katowice, Poland and Ostrava, Czech Republic
