= Radzionków =

Town in Silesian Voivodeship, Poland

Radzionków Radziōnkōw (Silesian)
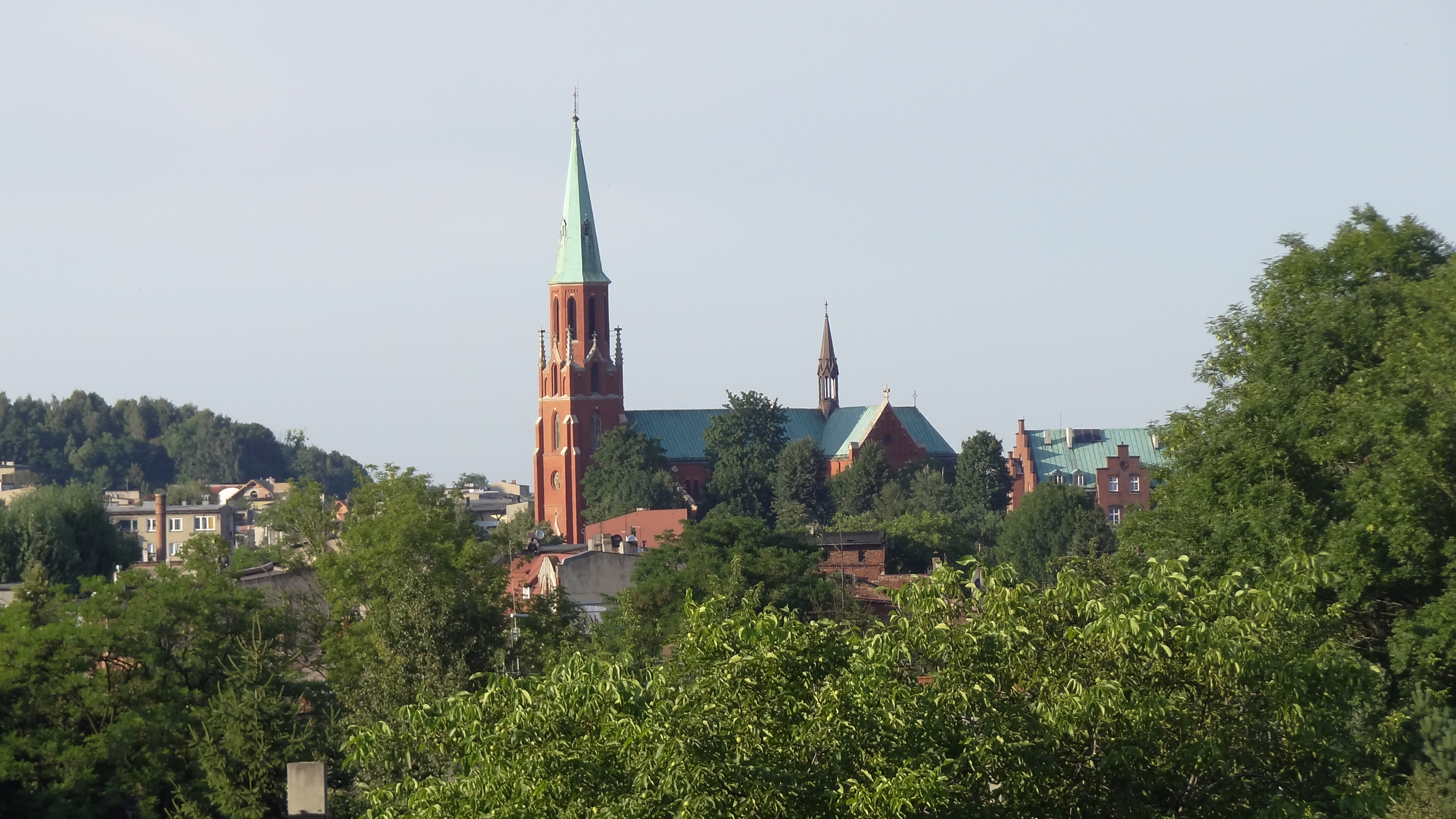
- Church of Saint Adalbert of Prague

- Flag Coat of arms

- Location within Poland
- Coordinates: 50°23′N 18°53′E
- Country: Poland
- Voivodeship: Silesian
- County: Tarnowskie Góry
- Gmina: Radzionków (urban gmina)
- First mentioned: 1326

Area
  - City: 13.4 km^{2} (5.2 sq mi)

Population (2019-06-30)
  - City: 16,826
  - Density: 1,260/km^{2} (3,250/sq mi)
  - Urban: 2,746,000
  - Metro: 5,294,000
- Time zone: UTC+1 (CET)
  - Summer (DST): UTC+2 (CEST)
- Postal code: 41-922
- Website: http://www.radzionkow.pl

Radzionków ([raˈd͡ʑɔŋkuf]; Silesian: Radziōnkōw, Cidry, German: Radzionkau) is a town in Silesia in southern Poland, near Katowice. Outer town of the Metropolis GZM – metropolis with a population of 2 million. Located in the Silesian Highlands.

It is situated in the Silesian Voivodeship since its formation in 1999, previously in Katowice Voivodeship, and before then, of the Autonomous Silesian Voivodeship. In 1975–1997 it was a part of Bytom before it became a separate entity in 1998. Radzionków is one of the towns of the 2.7 million conurbation – Katowice urban area and within a greater Katowice-Ostrava metropolitan area populated by about 5,294,000 people. The population of the town is 16,826 (2019).

== Etymology ==
The name is of Polish origin, and comes from the masculine given name Radzionek.

== History ==
Radzionków was a rather small village in the medieval period, and was first mentioned in a church document of the Diocese of Kraków from 1326. In 1480, it became a possession of Jan Długosz, the most famous Polish chronicler of the 15th century. The settlement then passed to Silesian nobility, and calamine mining began. Radzionków was part of the Bytom region and, from 1697, of the Free State Country of Bytom.

In the 19th century, the settlement experienced industrial growth. The first coal mine and a zinc smelter were opened in 1871 and 1884, respectively. From the early 19th century until the eve of World War I, the population grew from about 400 to 10,000. The settlement remained overwhelmingly Polish by nationality and Catholic by religion. During the interwar period, a stadium was opened, a new sewer system was built, and a park was founded.

Memorials to local Polish victims of Nazi Germany

Following the German-Soviet invasion of Poland, which started World War II in September 1939, Radzionków was occupied by Germany until 1945. The German occupiers implemented a policy of Germanization, suppressed the Catholic Church, forcibly conscripted hundreds of residents into the army, and killed 55 members of the resistance. A local Polish policeman was murdered by the Russians in the Katyn massacre in 1940. In 1945, the Soviets deported 300 men to forced labour in the USSR.

== Sports ==
The local football club is Ruch Radzionków.

== Notable people ==
- Artur Sowiński (born 1987), Polish mixed martial artist
