= Katowice urban area =

Silesian conurbation and largest urban area in Poland

Katowice urban area konurbacja katowicka (Polish)
- Urban area
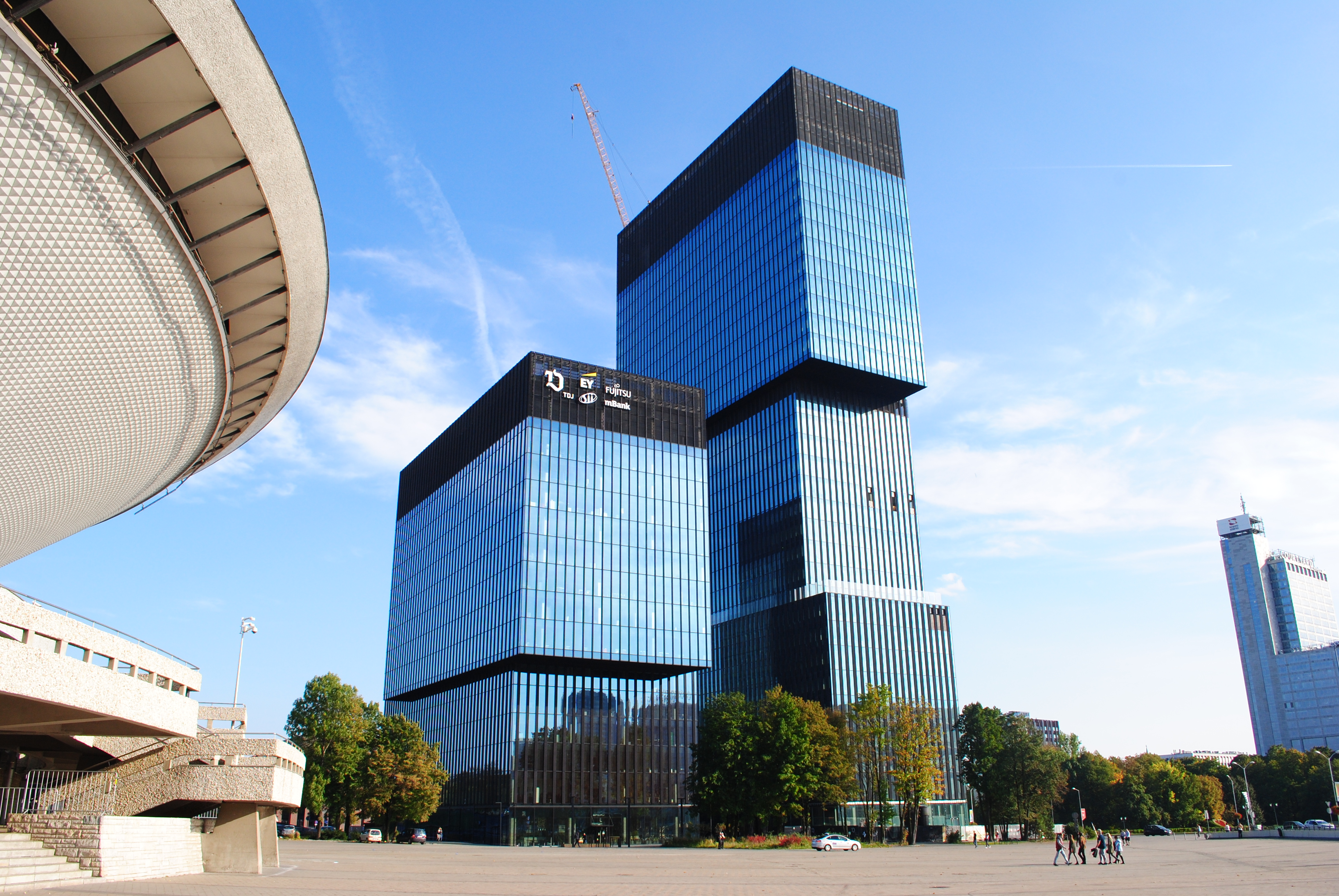
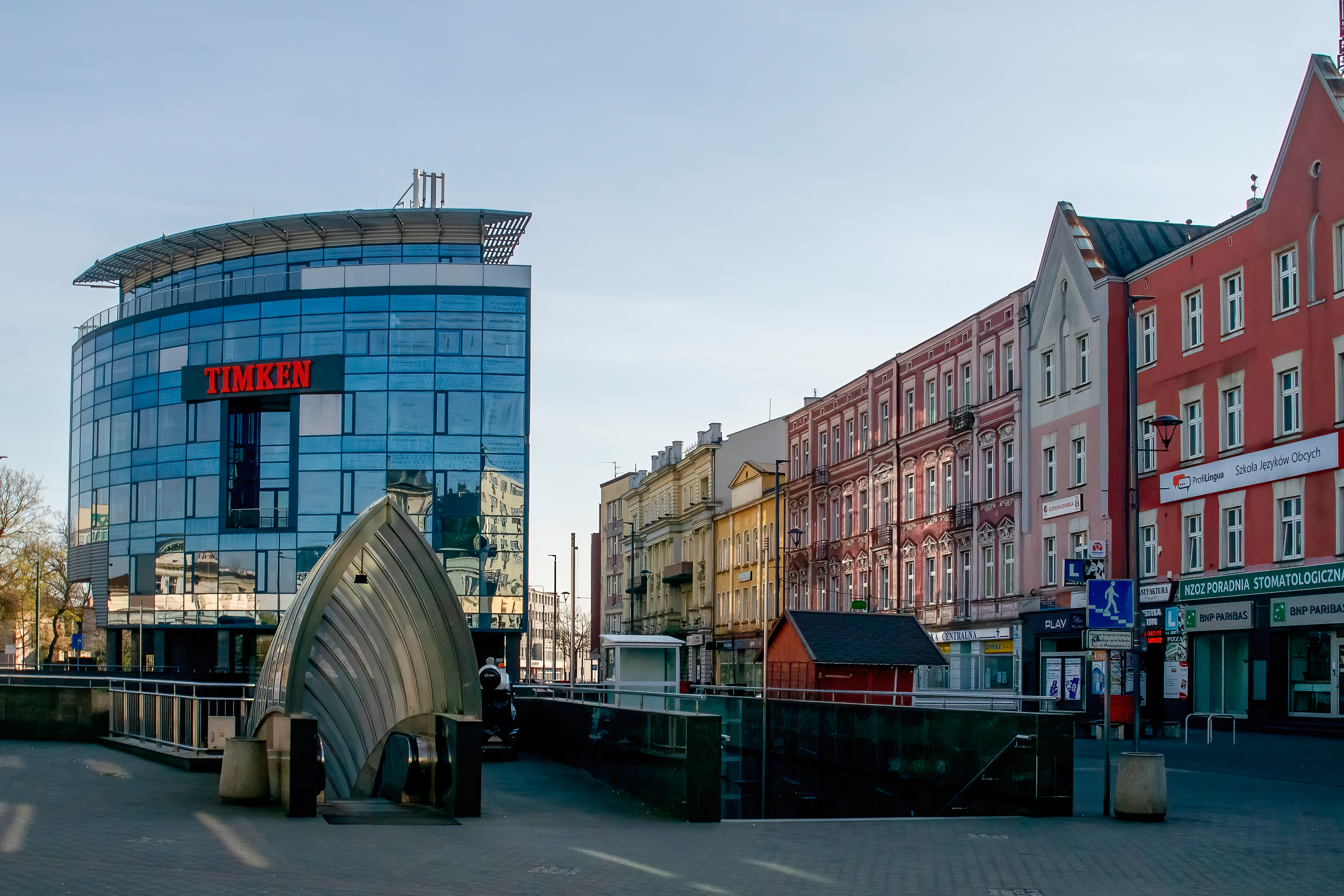
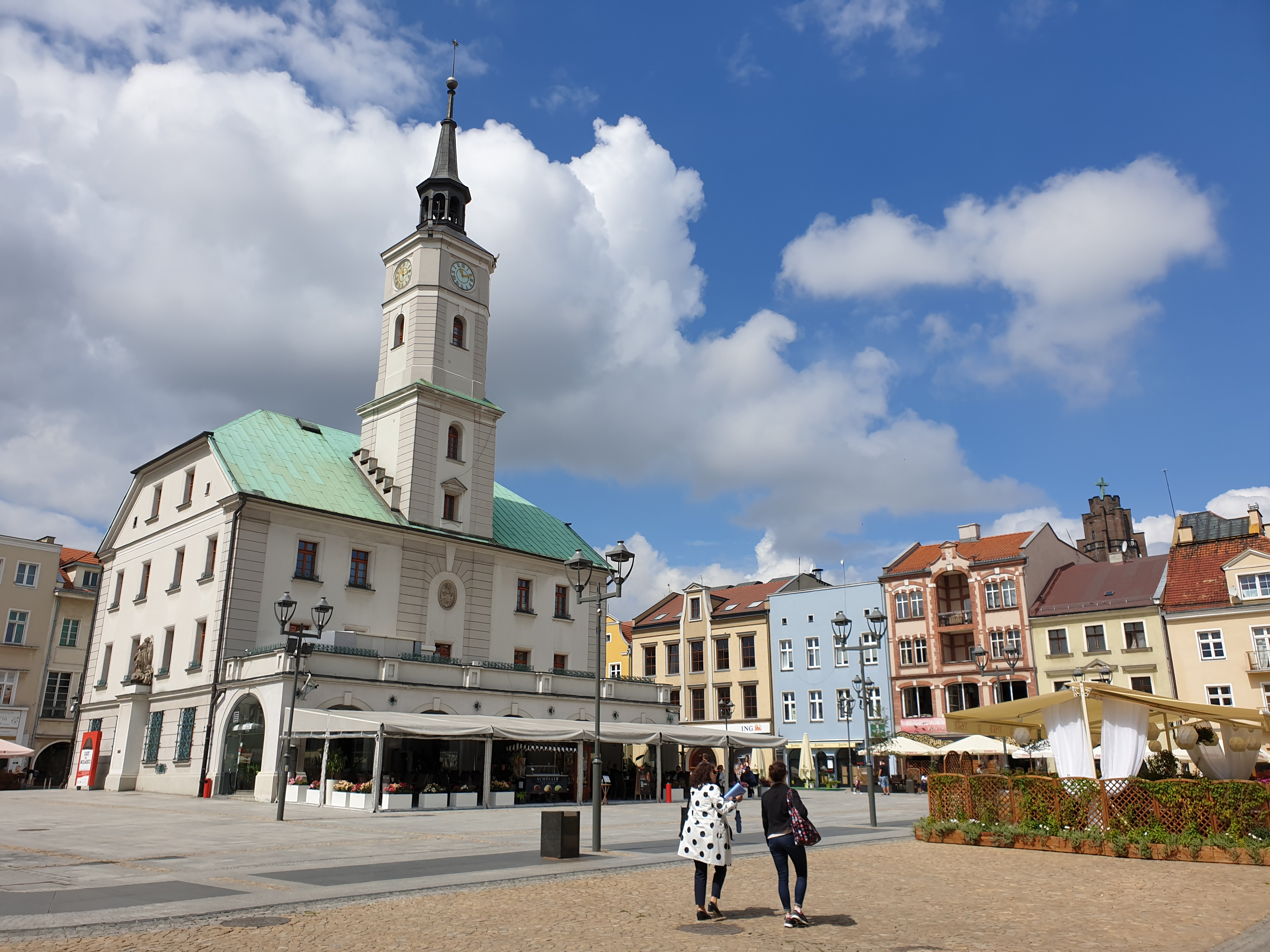
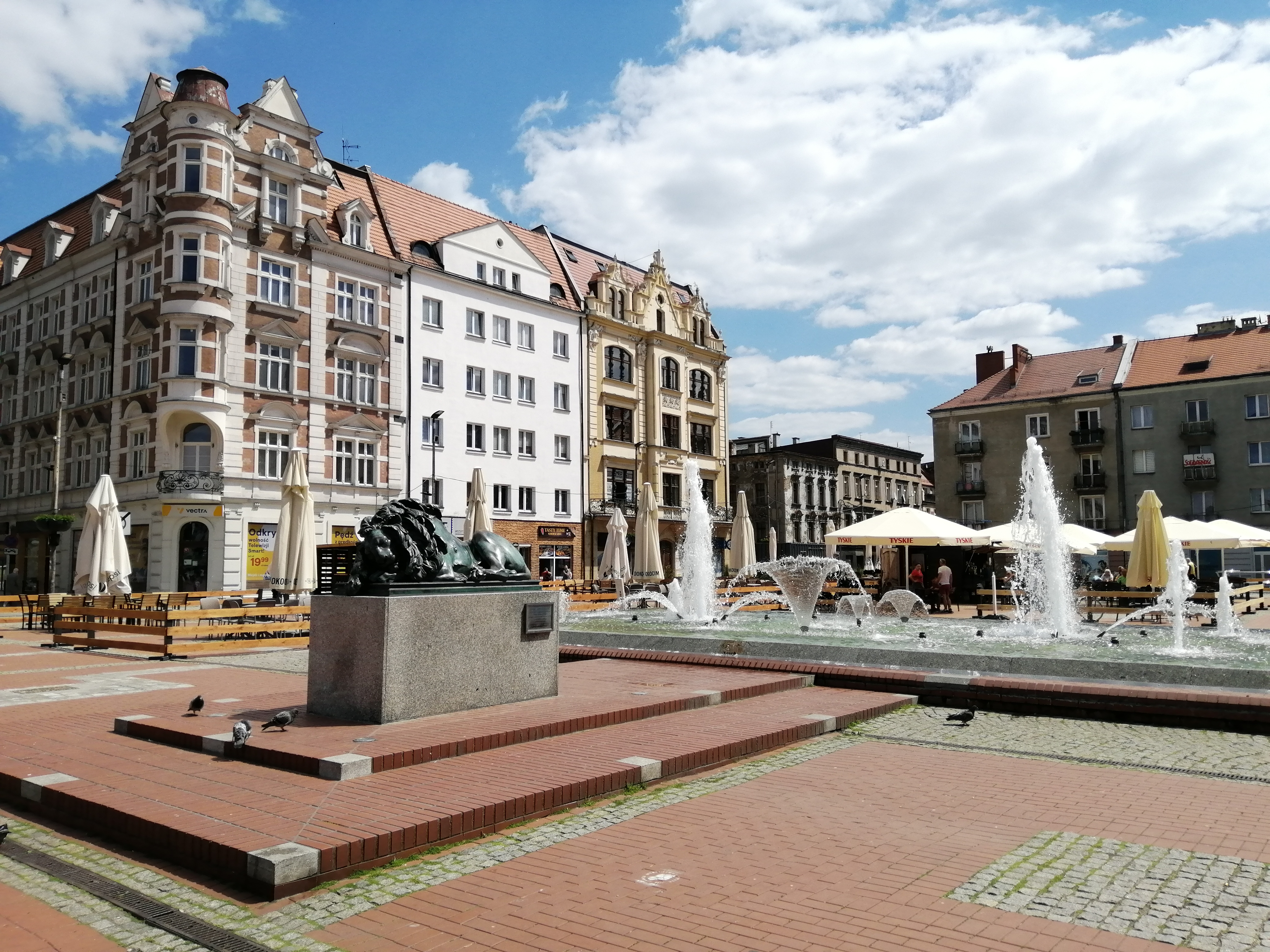
- From top, left to right: KTW buildings in Katowice; Plac Stulecia (Centennial Square) in Sosnowiec; Market Square and City Hall in Gliwice; Market Square in Bytom

- Map of Katowice urban area (in light yellow) and its metropolitan area (in light grey). Parts of Rybnik metropolitan area also visible in the bottom-left corner.

- Location in Poland
- Coordinates: 50°15′N 19°00′E
- Country: Poland
- Voivodeship: Silesian Voivodeship
- Largest city: Katowice

Government
  - Body: Metropolis GZM

Area
  - Urban: 1,468 km^{2} (567 sq mi)
  - Metro: 2,949 km^{2} (1,139 sq mi)

Population (2023)
  - Urban: 1,991,000
  - Urban density: 1,356/km^{2} (3,513/sq mi)
  - Metro: 2,535,354
  - Metro density: 859.7/km^{2} (2,227/sq mi)

GDP
  - Metro: €44.570 billion (2021)
- Primary airport: Katowice Airport

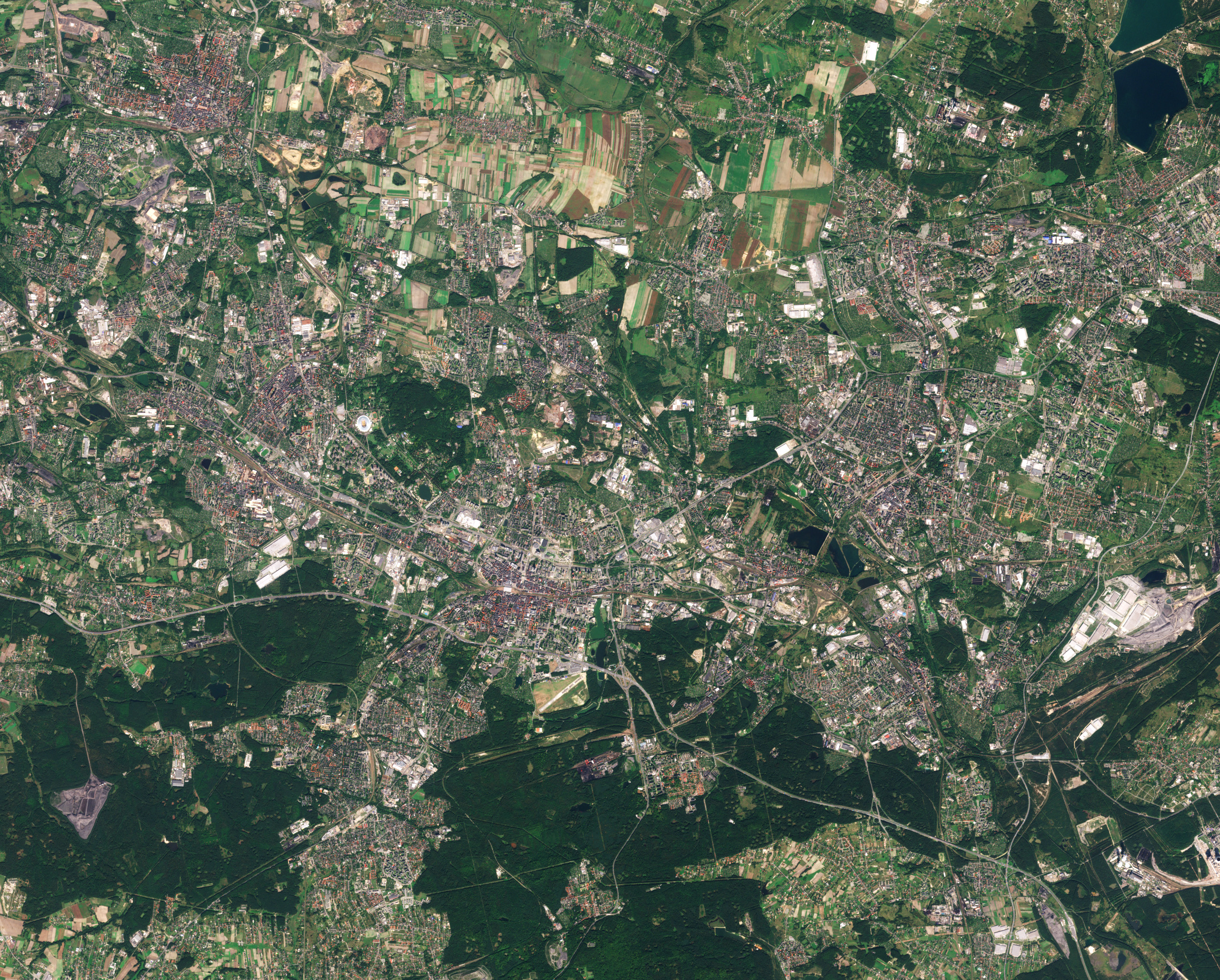
Aerial view of the central part of the urban area.

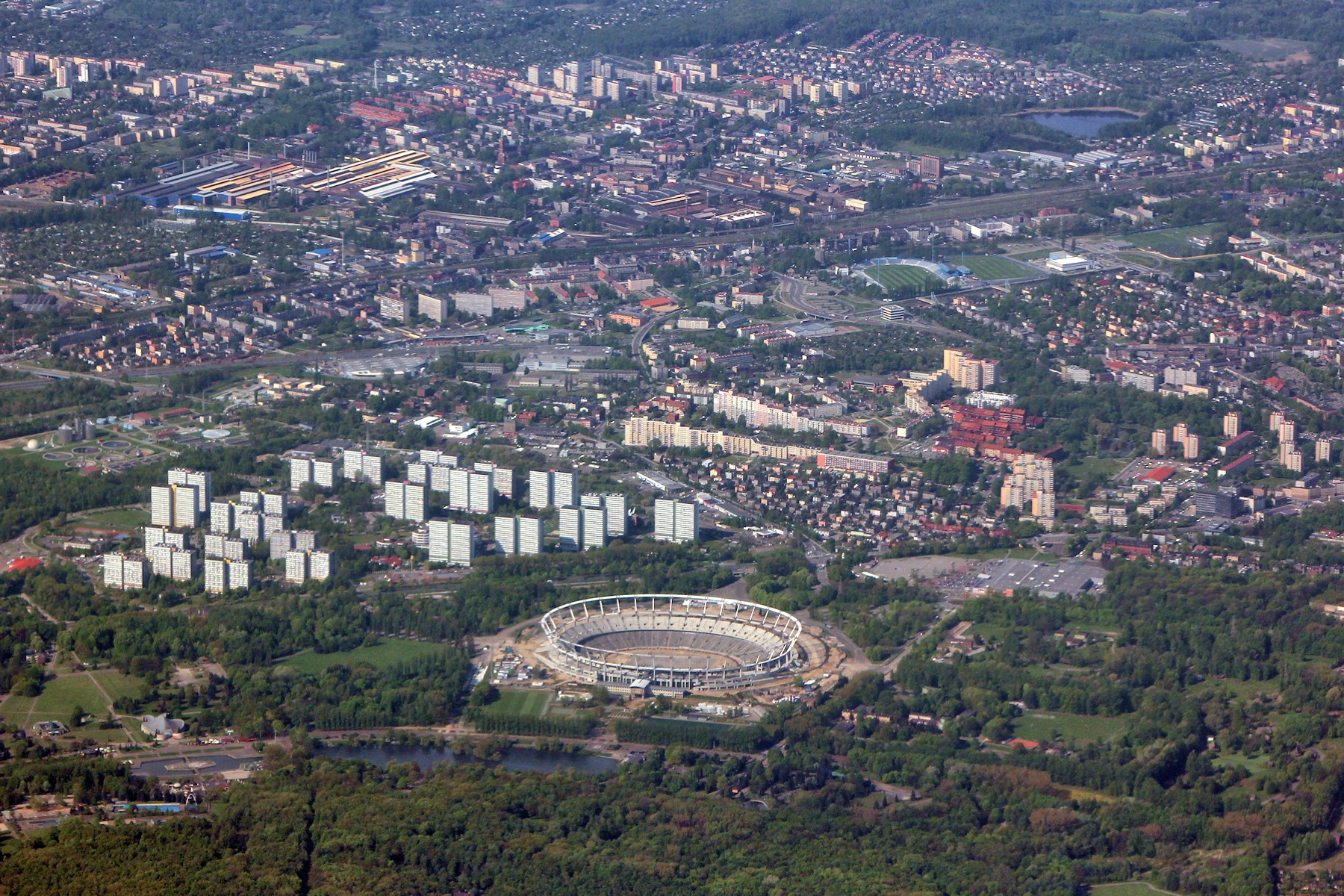
Intertwined built-up area of the cities of Katowice, Chorzów and Świętochłowice. Allotment gardens on the outskirts of the city of Ruda Śląska visible in the far background.

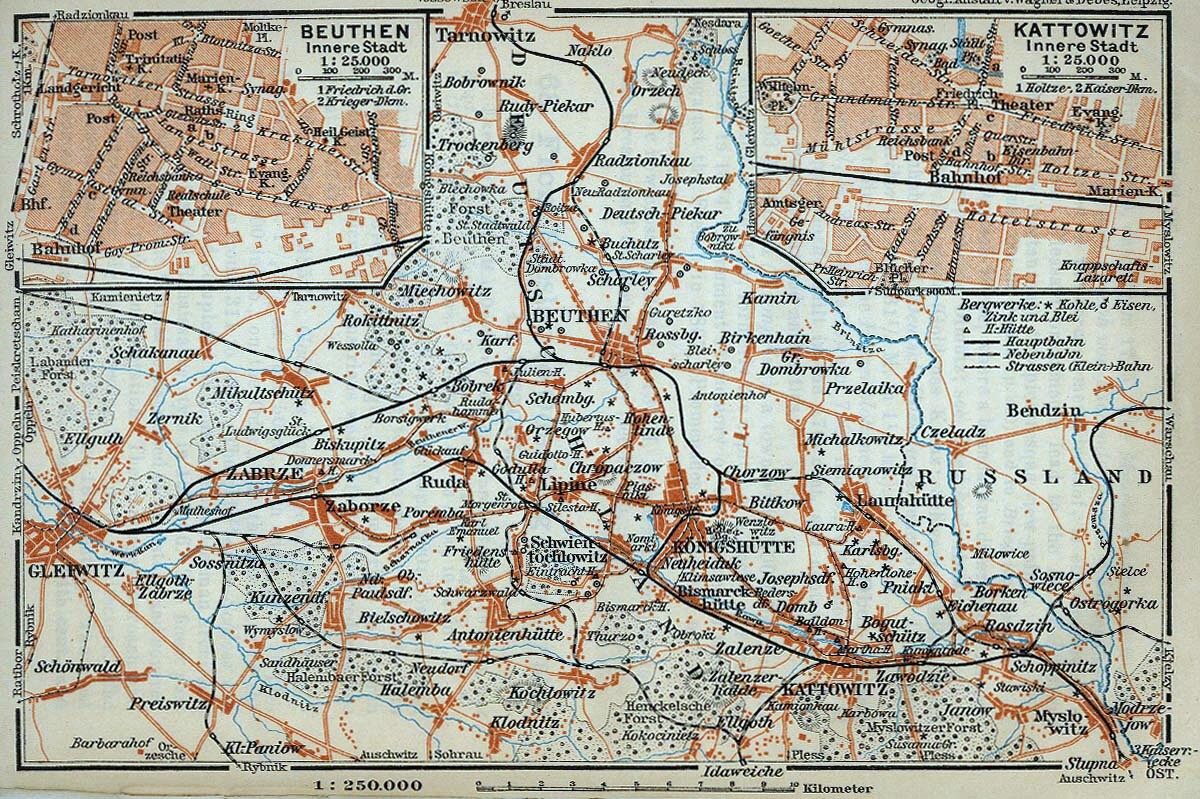
Map of the area from early 20th century.

The Katowice urban area (Polish: Konurbacja katowicka, pronounced [kɔnurˈbat͡sja katɔˈvit͡ska]), also known as the Upper Silesian urban area (Konurbacja górnośląska, [kɔnurˈbat͡sja ɡurnɔˈɕlɔ̃ska]), is an urban area/conurbation in southern Poland, centered on Katowice. It is located in the Silesian Voivodeship. The Katowice urban area is the largest urban area in Poland and 22nd largest urban area in the European Union. According to Demographia, its population is 1,991,000 (August 2025).

== Alternative names ==
English: Katowice conurbation, Upper Silesian conurbation, Silesian conurbation, Upper Silesian urban area.
Polish: konurbacja katowicka, konurbacja górnośląska, konurbacja śląska, konurbacja śląsko-dąbrowska, aglomeracja katowicka, aglomeracja górnośląska.

== Administration of urban area ==
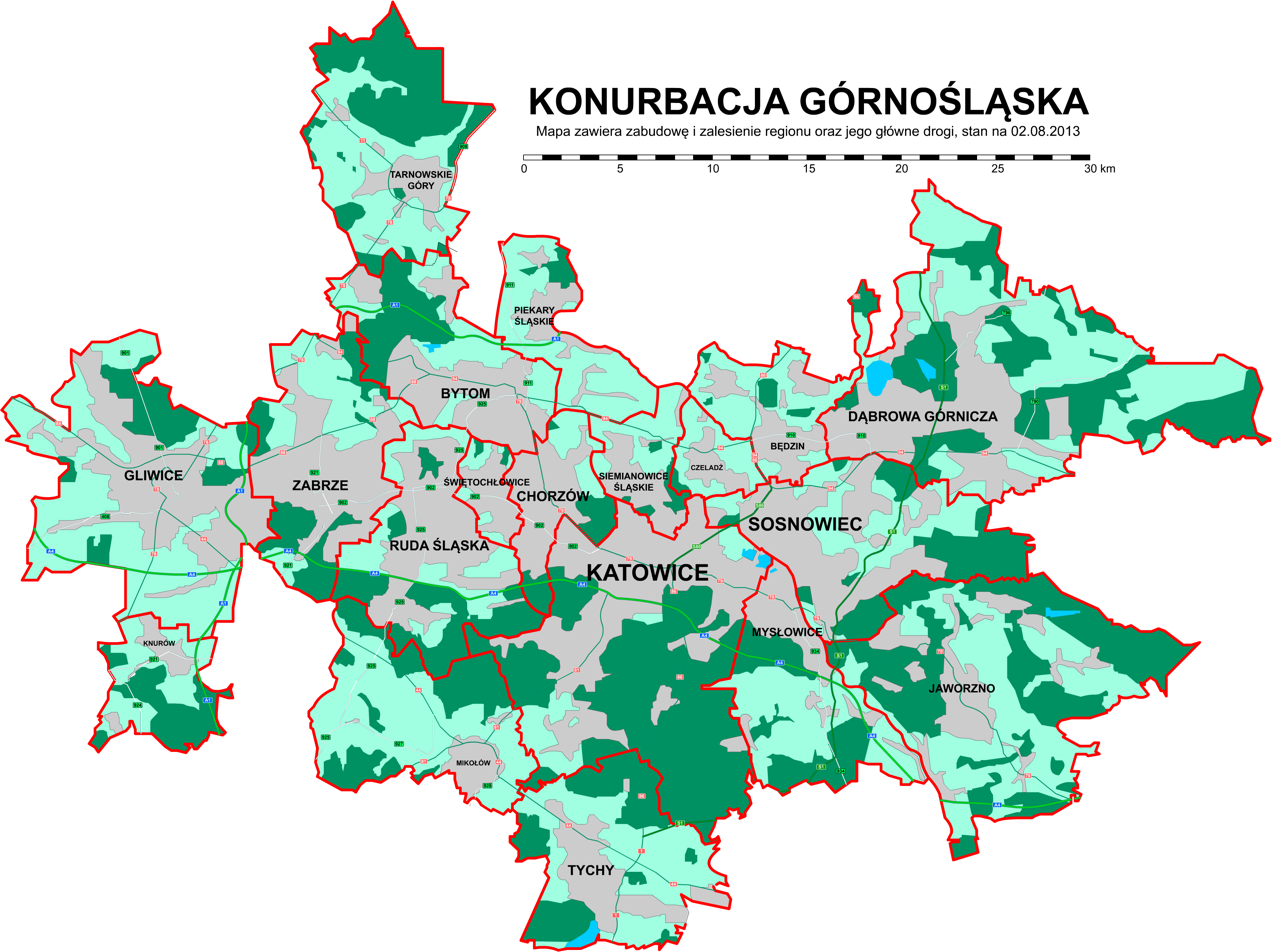
Map of cities and towns of Katowice urban area according to Statistics Poland.

In the years 2008–2017, the Metropolitan Association of Upper Silesia encompassed the 14 cities with powiat rights of the urban area. In 2017, it was replaced by the Metropolis GZM, however, the latter includes a total of 41 gminas of the wider Katowice metropolitan area, and doesn't include Jaworzno due to political reasons.

According to Statistics Poland, the Katowice urban area consists of 19 bordering cities in the Silesian Voivodeship: Będzin, Bytom, Chorzów, Czeladź, Dąbrowa Górnicza, Gliwice, Jaworzno, Katowice, Knurów, Mikołów, Mysłowice, Piekary Śląskie, Ruda Śląska, Siemianowice Śląskie, Świętochłowice, Sosnowiec, Tychy, Tarnowskie Góry, and Zabrze.

The cities and statistics (1 January 2008):

| City | Population | Area (km^{2}) | Density (km^{−2}) |
|---|---|---|---|
| Katowice | 312,201 | 164.67 | 1,896 |
| Sosnowiec | 222,586 | 91.06 | 2,444 |
| Gliwice | 197,393 | 133.88 | 1,474 |
| Zabrze | 189,062 | 80.40 | 2,352 |
| Bytom | 184,765 | 69.44 | 2,661 |
| Ruda Śląska | 144,584 | 77.73 | 1,860 |
| Tychy | 129,776 | 81.64 | 1,590 |
| Dąbrowa Górnicza | 128,795 | 188.73 | 682 |
| Chorzów | 113,678 | 33.24 | 3,420 |
| Jaworzno | 95,520 | 152.67 | 626 |
| Mysłowice | 74,912 | 65.75 | 1,139 |
| Siemianowice Śląskie | 71,621 | 25.5 | 2,809 |
| Tarnowskie Góry | 60,975 | 83.72 | 728 |
| Piekary Śląskie | 59,061 | 39.98 | 1,477 |
| Będzin | 58,639 | 37.37 | 1,569 |
| Świętochłowice | 54,525 | 13.31 | 4,097 |
| Knurów | 39,449 | 33.95 | 1,162 |
| Mikołów | 38,698 | 79.20 | 489 |
| Czeladź | 34,072 | 16.38 | 2,080 |
| Total | 2,124,344 | 1,443.12 | 1,472 |

== See also ==
- Metropolis GZM
- Upper Silesian Industrial Region
- Upper Silesian Coal Basin
- Katowice-Ostrava metropolitan area
