= Metropolitan Association of Upper Silesia =

Metropolitan Association of Upper Silesia Górnośląski Związek Metropolitalny (Polish)
- municipal association
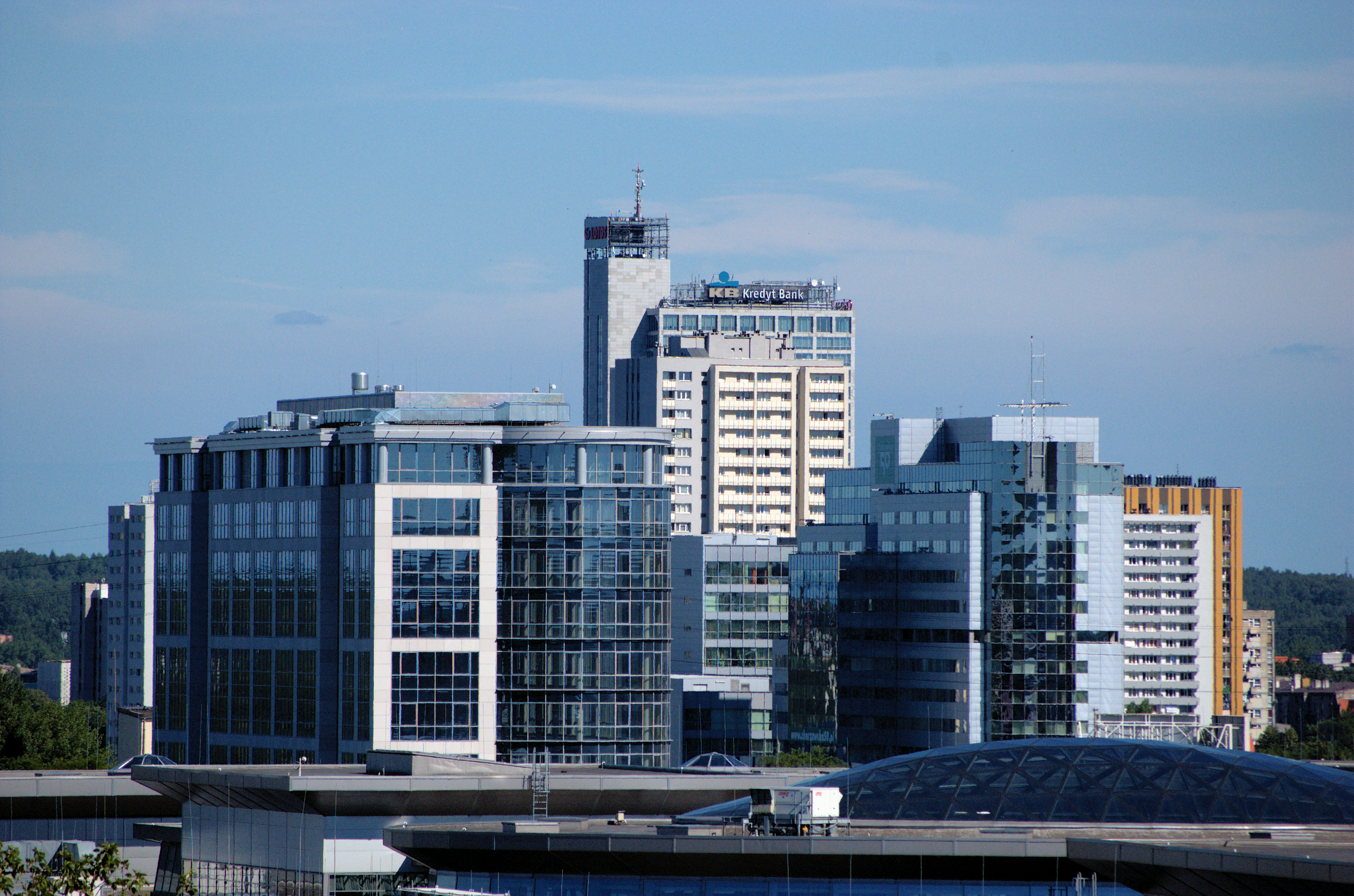
- Katowice Financial Center
- Interactive map of Metropolitan Association of Upper Silesia
- Country: Poland
- Voivodship: Silesia
- Council: Zarząd GZM

Population (2008)
  - Total: 2,039,454

The Metropolitan Association of Upper Silesia or Upper Silesian Metropolitan Union (Polish: Górnośląski Związek Metropolitalny), often referred to in Poland as Silesian Metropolis (Polish: Metropolia Silesia), was a municipal association (Polish: związek międzygminny) composed of 14 adjacent cities with powiat rights of Katowice urban area in the Polish Silesian Voivodeship. The association existed from 2007 to 2017, when its role was effectively taken over by the Metropolis GZM.

The goal of the union was the creation of a strong metropolitan center with shared resources, an internationally competitive profile and unified management of common infrastructure.

== Goals ==
The main goals of the union included the following:

- Arriving at a common development strategy for the cities of the union, in accordance with the current law governing planning and land use
- Implementing projects joined by a common development strategy of the cities
- Obtaining financing from domestic and foreign funding sources
- Managing the roadways transferred to the union by its constituent cities
- Obtaining aid from the European Union
- Stimulating the job market throughout the constituent cities
- Supporting innovative economic programs, increasing the competitive standing of the cities
- Influencing legislative and decision-making processes in matters important to the union and affecting the union's activities

Nationally, the union strived to address several problems including:

- Poor recognition (often omitted from Polish maps)
- Under-investment (MAUS receives the lowest per-capita allocation of EU development funds in Poland)

The effects of the union's activity included: improvement in managing the consortium, strengthening its economic muscle and increasing the competitive standing of the cities of the MAUS, coordination of public relations and promoting the member cities, and underscoring the importance of the region.

== History ==
It was created by local authorities with little or no actual public discourse. The intent to form the union was formally stated by the mayors of the participating cities, who signed a declaration to this effect on 9 January 2006 in Świętochłowice. The Union's registration was signed by the Ministry of Internal Affairs and Administration of the Republic of Poland (Polish: MSWiA) on 8 June 2007 with the city of Katowice.

On 1 July 2017 a new sui generis entity, the Metropolis GZM (Polish: Górnośląsko-Zagłębiowska Metropolia), was created. Therefore, the Metropolitan Association of Upper Silesia was discontinued on 28 December 2017.

== Participating municipalities ==
Originally 17 cities were to enter into the union; due to technicalities in Polish law which could have prevented its legalization, only 14 of the 17 cities (that is, those with the legal status of a City with powiat rights) proceeded with forming the union. Towns of Będzin, Czeladź and Knurów declared their willingness to join the Silesian Metropolis, but due to legal issues canceled their candidacy.

The borders between the constituent cities have been for decades artificial, and sometimes absurd; for example, one side of a street would belong to one city and the other to another.

The constituent cities by population numbers were as follows (data of 2008):

Map of cities of Silesian Metropolis.

District	Population	Area		Density	
District	Population	km^{2}	sq. mi.	/km^{2}	/sq. mi.
Katowice	312,201	164.67	63.58	1,896	4,910
Sosnowiec	222,586	91.06	35.16	2,444	6,330
Gliwice	197,393	133.88	51.69	1,474	3,820
Zabrze	189,062	80.40	31.04	2,352	6,090
Bytom	184,765	69.44	26.81	2,661	6,890
Ruda Śląska	144,584	77.73	30.01	1,860	4,800
Tychy	129,776	81.64	31.52	1,590	4,100
Dąbrowa Górnicza	128,795	188.73	72.87	682	1,770
Chorzów	113,678	33.24	12.83	3,420	8,900
Jaworzno	95,520	152.67	58.95	626	1,620
Mysłowice	74,912	65.75	25.39	1,139	2,950
Siemianowice Śląskie	71,621	25.5	9.8	2,809	7,280
Piekary Śląskie	59,061	39.98	15.44	1,477	3,830
Świętochłowice	54,525	13.31	5.14	4,097	10,610
Total	1,978,479	1,218	470	1,624.4	4,207

== See also ==
- Tricity
