= Upper Silesian Industrial Region =

Large industrial region in Poland

Coordinates: 50°15′N 19°00′E

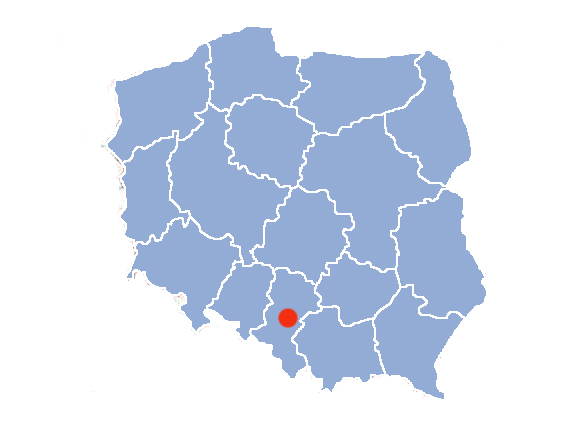
The location of Katowice in Poland

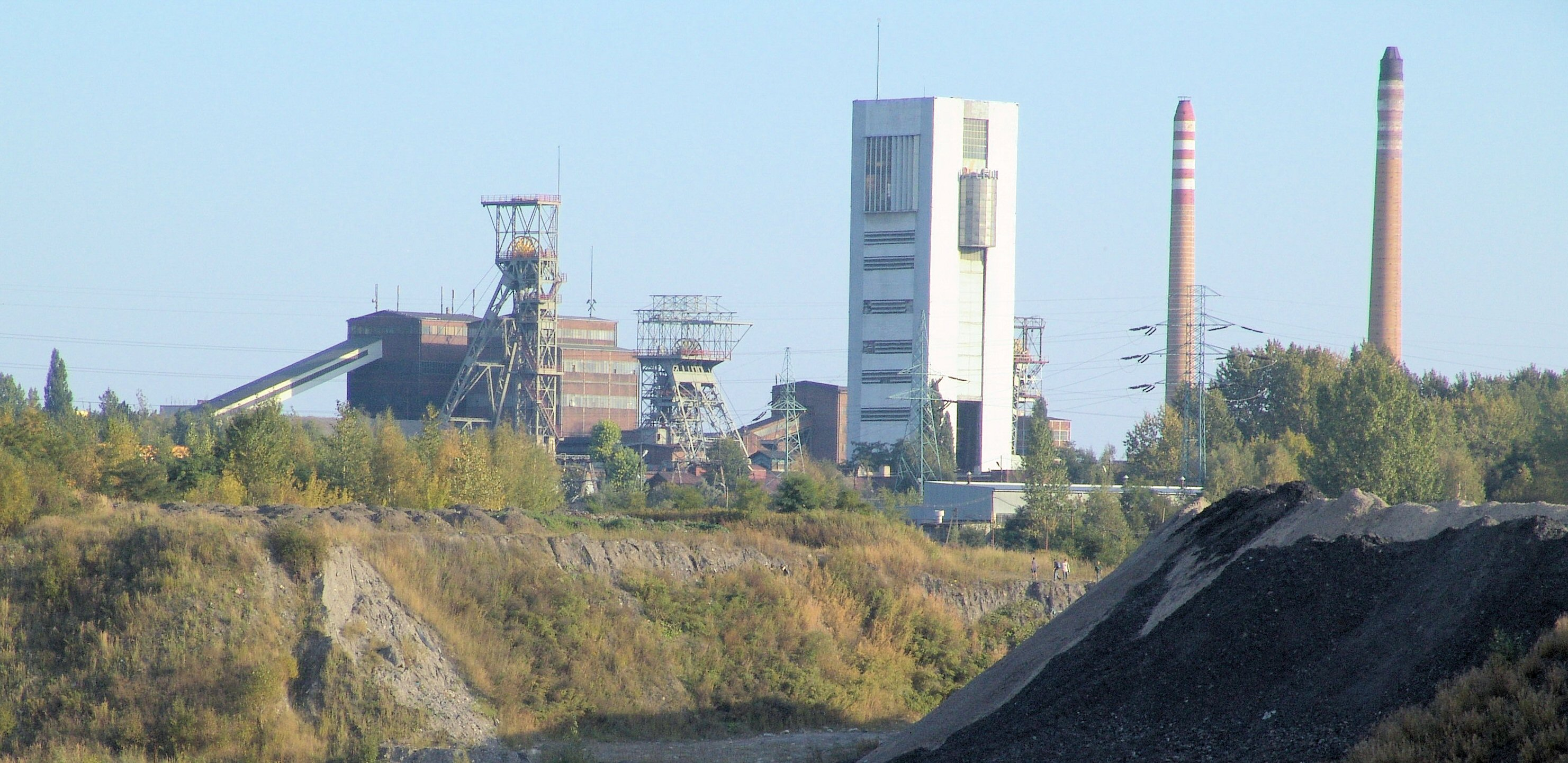
Bobrek-Centrum coal mine in Bytom

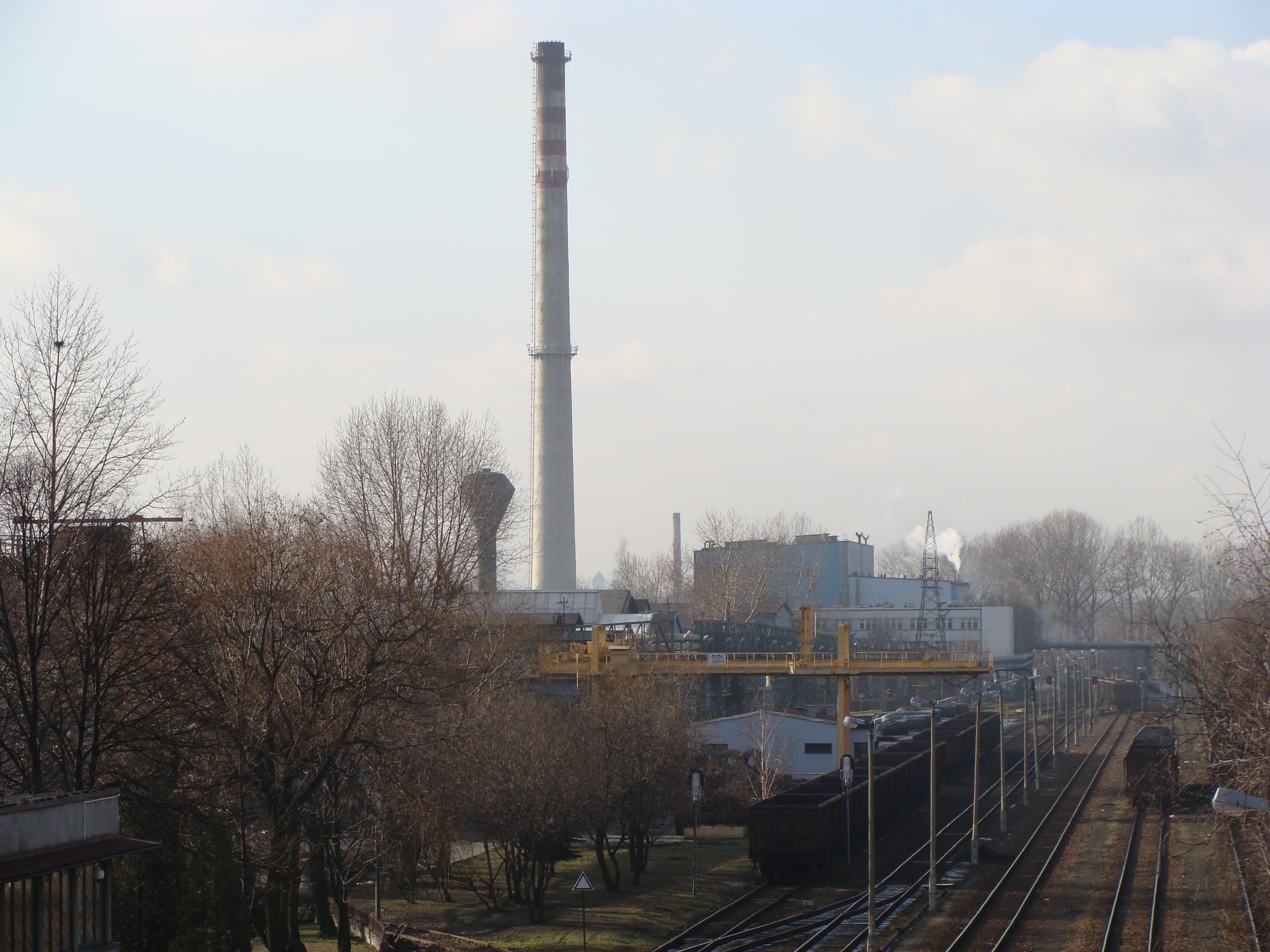
ArcelorMittal ironworks in Sosnowiec

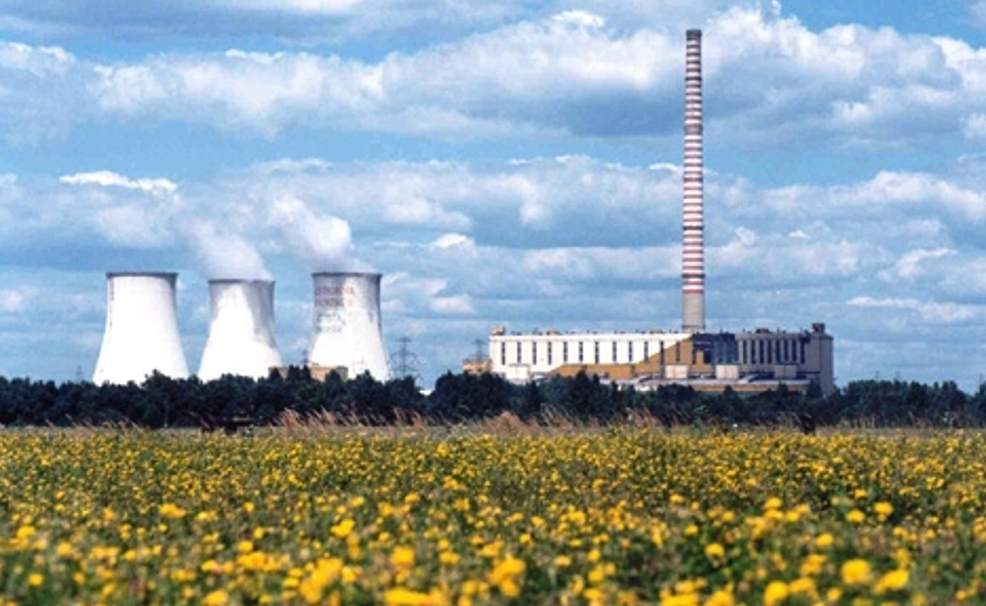
Jaworzno III Power Plant

The Upper Silesian Industrial Region (Polish: Górnośląski Okręg Przemysłowy, pronounced [gurnɔˈɕlɔ̃skʲi ˌɔkrɛŋk pʂɛmɨˈswɔvɨ], Polish abbreviation: GOP [gɔp]; German: Oberschlesisches Industriegebiet) is a large industrial region in Poland. It lies mainly in the Silesian Voivodeship, centered on Katowice.

It is situated in the northern part of Upper Silesian Coal Basin, a home of altogether 5 million people (Katowice-Ostrava metropolitan area). In the south-west it borders the Rybnik Coal Area (Polish: Rybnicki Okręg Węglowy, ROW). Covers 3,200 km² and about 3.5 million people.

The Upper Silesian Industrial Region is located in the province of Upper Silesia and Zagłębie Dąbrowskie in southern Poland in a basin between the Vistula and Oder rivers.

Upper Silesian Industrial Region is an area with enormous concentration of industry. Dominates here:

- Mining industry (more than a dozen active coal mines, mainly as Katowicki Holding Węglowy, Kompania Węglowa, JSW, Węglokoks)
- Iron and steel industry (more than a dozen active iron and nonferrous metals)
- Transport industry (example General Motors Manufacturing Poland and Fiat Auto Poland, Alstom Konstal, Bumar-Łabędy)
- The energy industry (more than a dozen plants)
- Mechanical engineering
- Chemical industry

== See also ==
- Metropolis GZM
- Rybnik Coal Area

== Literature ==
- (in Polish) "Katowice i Górnośląski Okręg Przemysłowy" - Krystyna Szaraniec & Lech Szaraniec & Karol Szarowski, Katowickie Towarzystwo Społeczno-Kulturalne, Katowice 1980
- (in Polish) "Górnośląski Okręg Przemysłowy: liczby, fakty, problemy" - Marek Grabania, Wydawnictwo Śląsk, Katowice 1964
- (in Polish) "Górnośląski Okręg Przemysłowy w świetle nowych opracowań zachodnioniemieckich" - Marian Frank, Silesian Institute in Katowice, Katowice 1960
