= Katowice metropolitan area =

Katowice metropolitan area górnośląski obszar metropolitalny (Polish)
- Metropolitan area
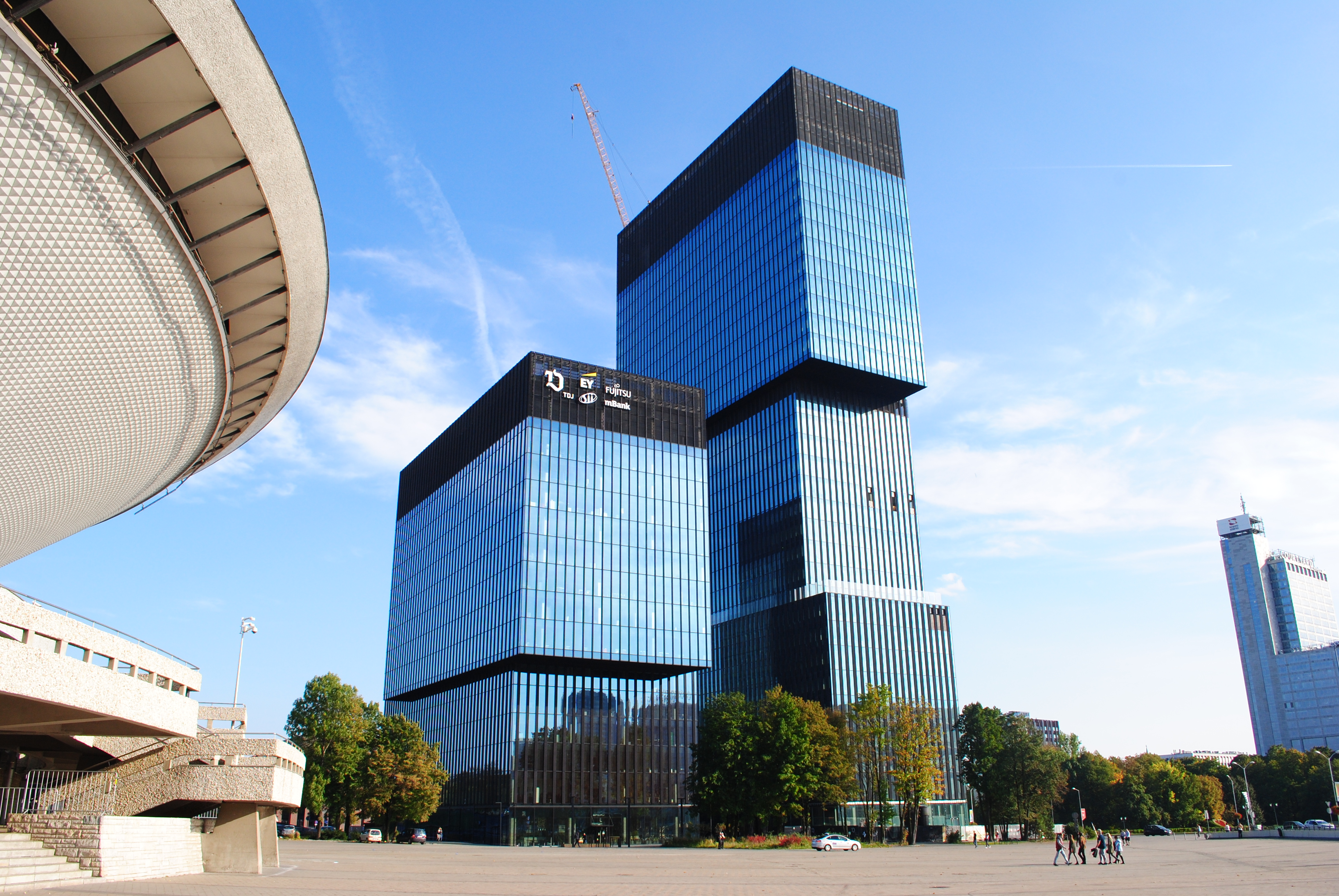
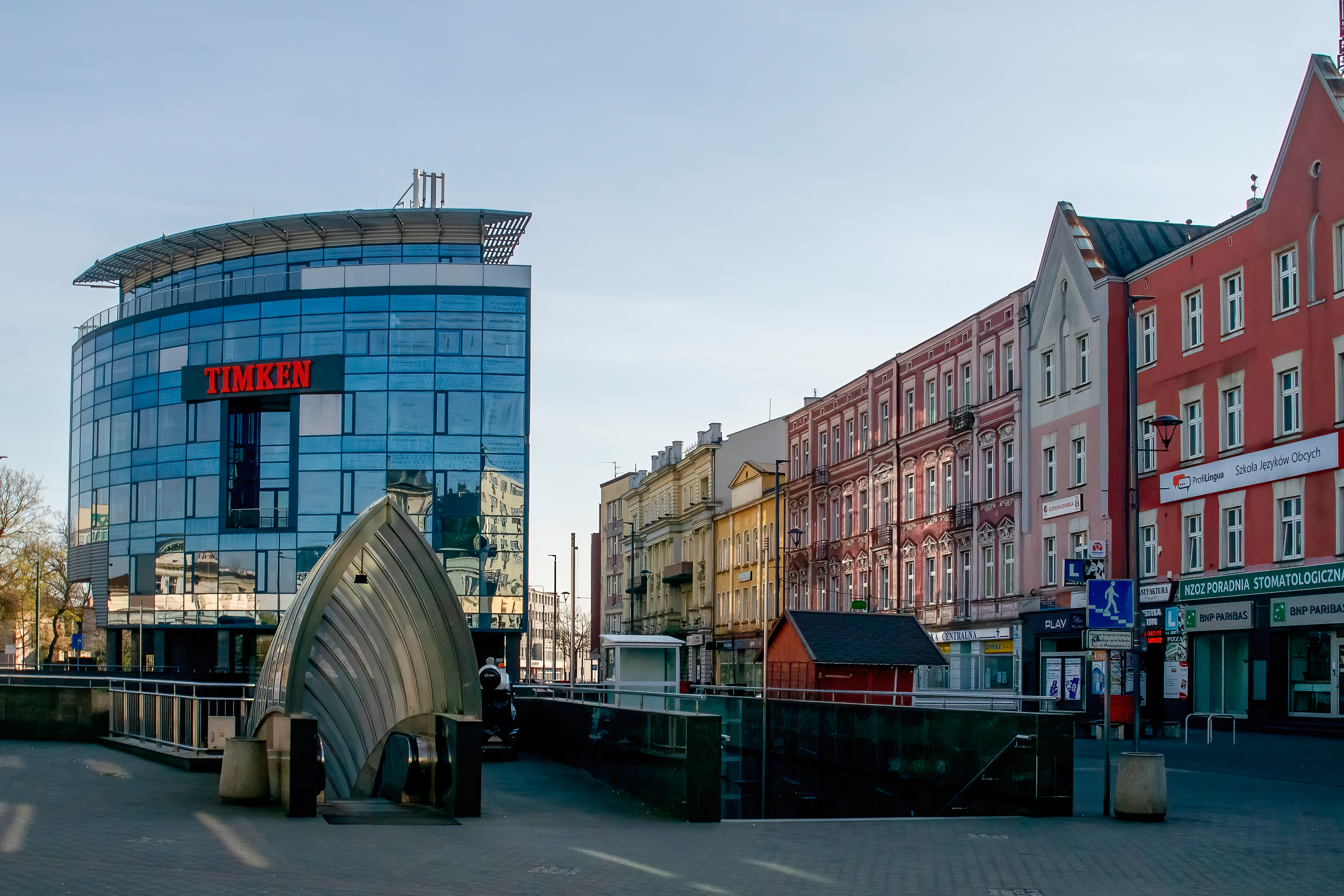
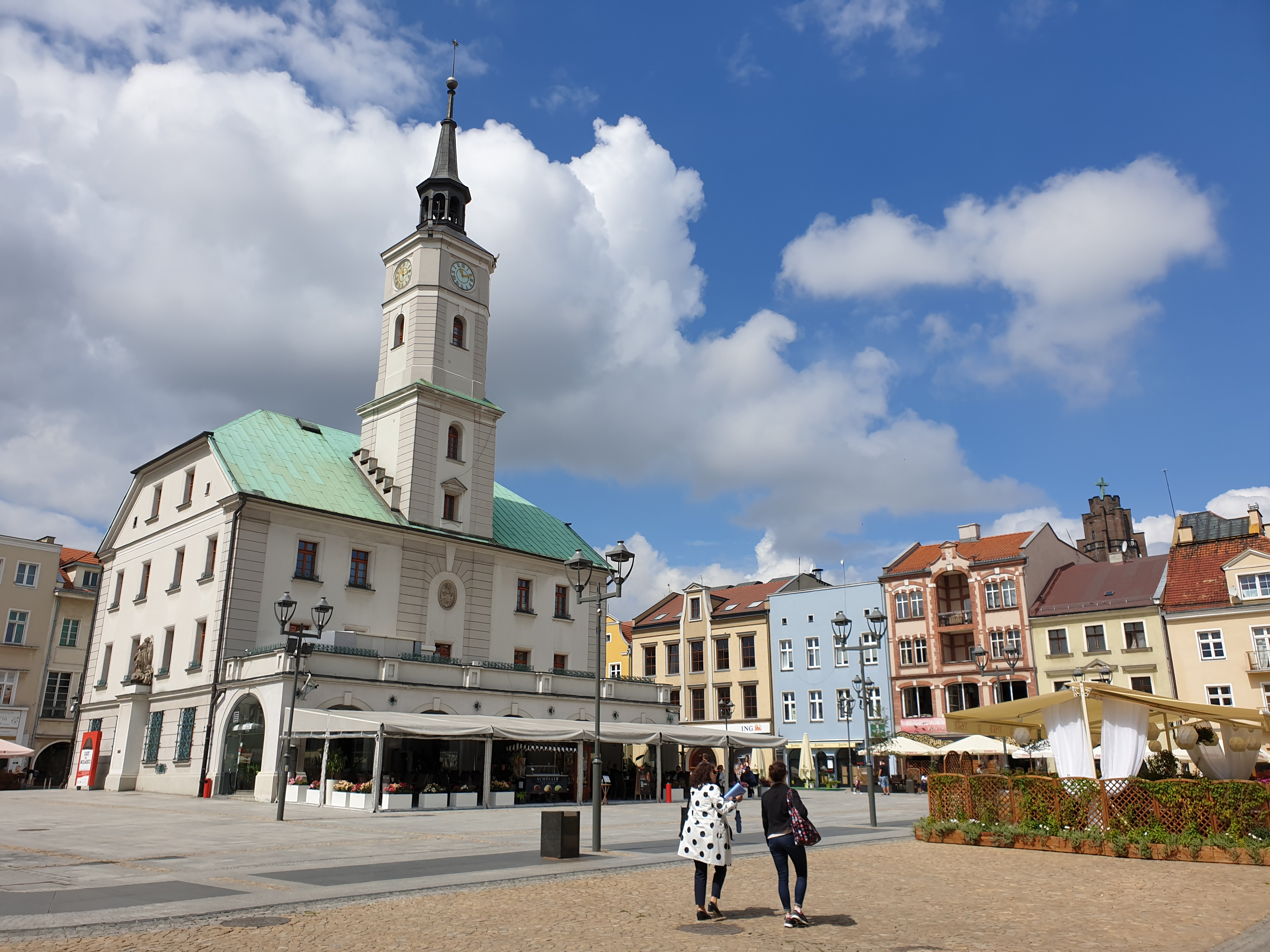
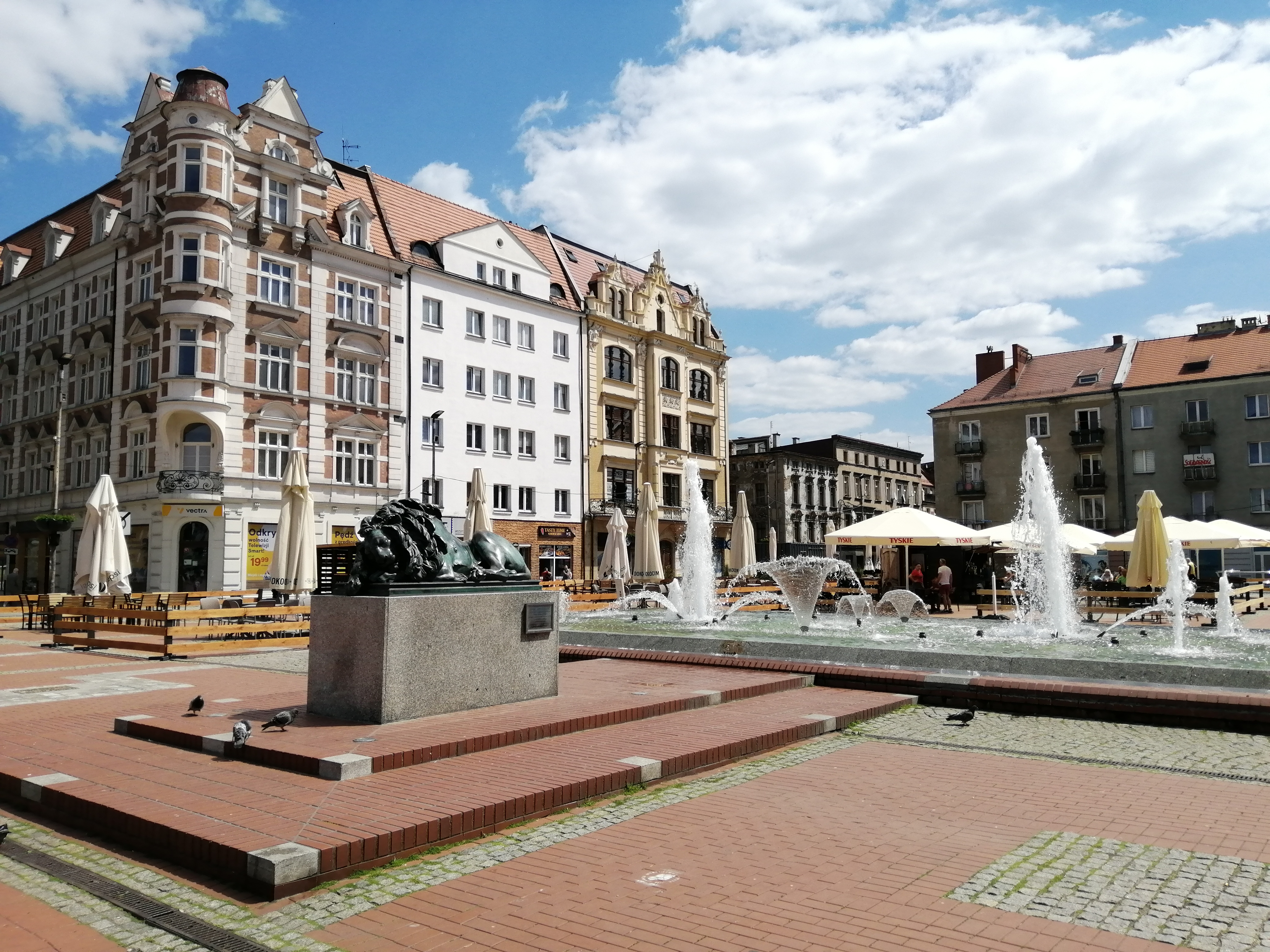
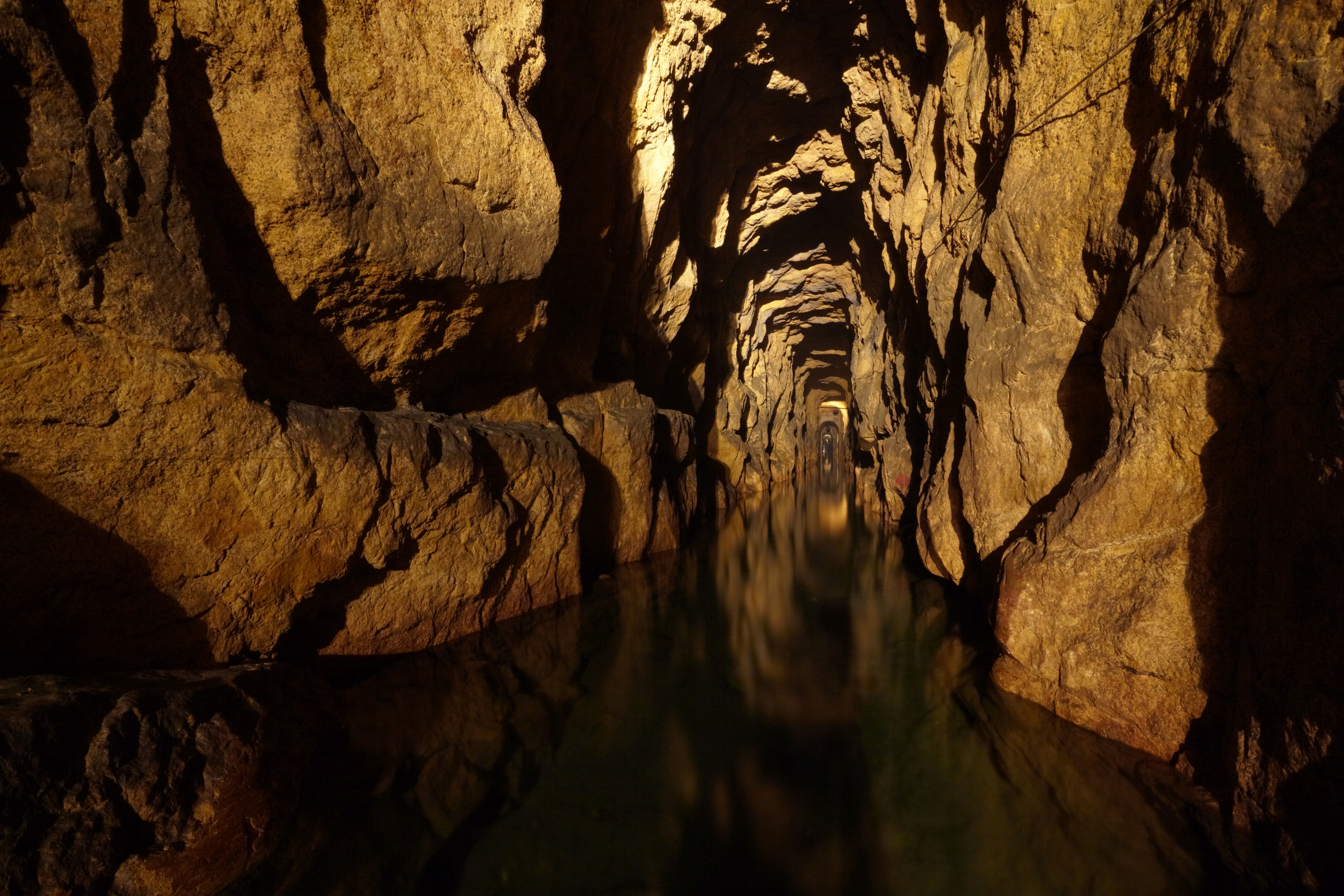
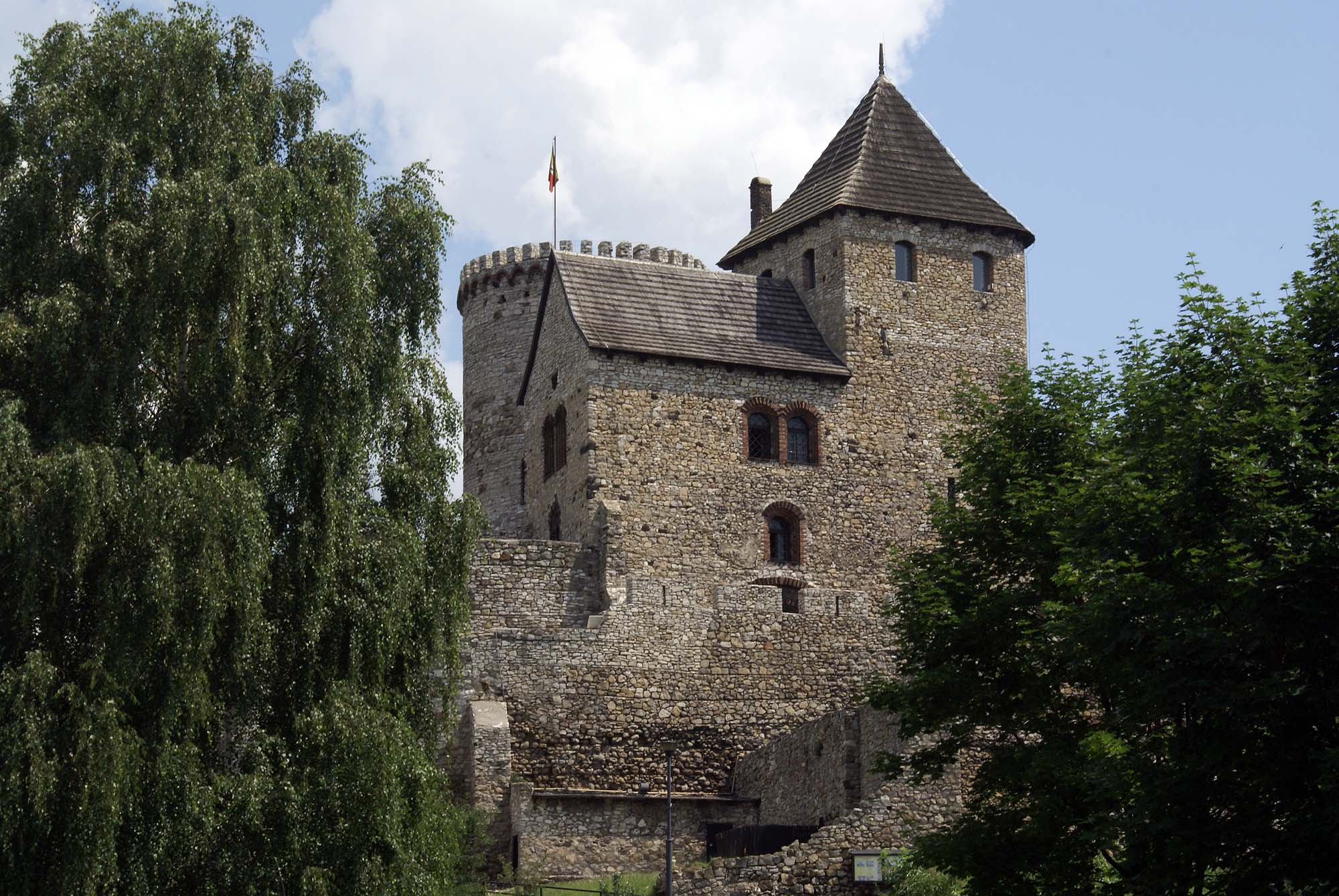
- From top, left to right: KTW buildings in Katowice; Plac Stulecia (Centennial Square) in Sosnowiec; Market Square and City Hall in Gliwice; Market Square in Bytom; Historic Silver Mine in Tarnowskie Góry; Royal Castle in Będzin

- Map of Katowice metropolitan area (parts of Rybnik metropolitan area also visible in the bottom-left corner)

- Location in Poland
- Coordinates: 50°15′N 19°00′E
- Country: Poland
- Voivodeship: Silesian Voivodeship
- Largest city: Katowice

Government
  - Body: Metropolis GZM

Area
  - Metro: 2,949 km^{2} (1,139 sq mi)

Population (2023)
  - Metro: 2,535,354
  - Metro density: 859.7/km^{2} (2,227/sq mi)

GDP
  - Metro: €44.570 billion (2021)
- Primary airport: Katowice Airport

Katowice metropolitan area, according to delimitation of Eurostat (Katowice FUA)

Katowice metropolitan area, also known as Upper Silesian metropolitan area (Polish: górnośląski obszar metropolitalny), is the metropolitan area of Katowice and its urban area, with a population of around 2.5 million (2023). It lies within the areas of the historic regions of Upper Silesia, Kraków Basin and Dąbrowa Basin. It is sometimes considered a part of the polycentric Katowice-Ostrava metropolitan area, which has a population of 5.3 million people (2002). Also this is (with Kraków metropolitan area among others) a part of Kraków-Katowice-Ostrava metropolitan region, which has a population of around 6.8 million.

== Demographics ==
There are given differing population numbers in different sources.

- 2,225,000 (2024) – according to citypopulation.de.
- 2,535,354 (2023) – according to Eurostat
- 2,700,000 (2006) – according to Metropolis.pl
- 2,746,000 (2001) – according to the scientific description by Tadeusz Markowski.
- 2,733,000 (2002) – according to the scientific description by Paweł Swianiewicz and Urszula Klimska.
- 2,886,700 (2004) – according to the scientific description by Kazimierz Fiedorowicz and Jacek Fiedorowicz.
- 3,029,000 (2002) – according to the European Spatial Planning Observation Network. Markered as 13th largest metropolitan area in European Union and also 6th polycentric metropolitan area in EU.
- 3,069,000 – according to the United Nations.
- 3,239,200 (2003) – according to the Ministry of Regional Development of Poland
- 3,488,000 – according to www.worldatlas.com.
- 3,500,000 – according to PWN Encyclopedia.
- 3,500,000 – according to the scientific description by Jerzy Parysek and Alexander Tölle.

== Metropolis GZM ==
Area of the Metropolis GZM

The Metropolis GZM (Polish: Metropolia GZM, formally in Polish Górnośląsko-Zagłębiowska Metropolia) is a metropolitan association composed of 41 contiguous municipalities in the Silesian Voivodeship of Poland, created on 1 July 2017. It has an area of 2553 km² and a population of 2 128 034 (2023).

The Metropolis GZM does not include Jaworzno, whose authorities decided not to join the association.
