= Upper Silesian Coal Basin =

Polish and Czech coal basin

Coordinates: 50°15′N 19°00′E

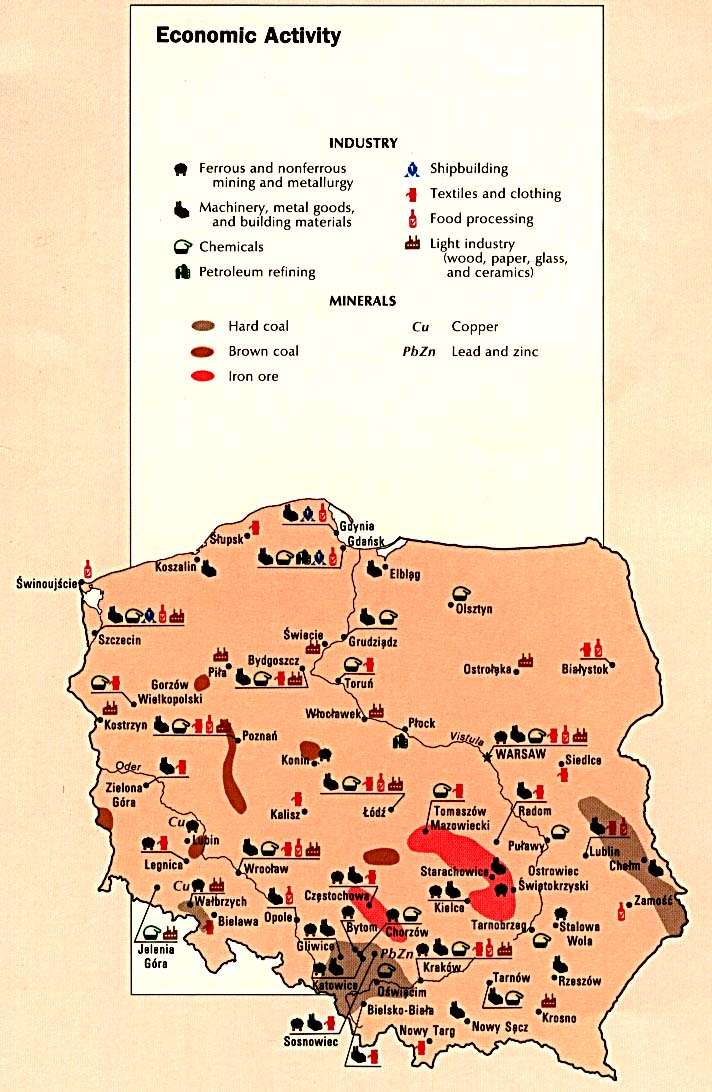
Economic activity in Poland in 1990. The Upper Silesian Coal Basin is visible in brown, in the southern part of the country.

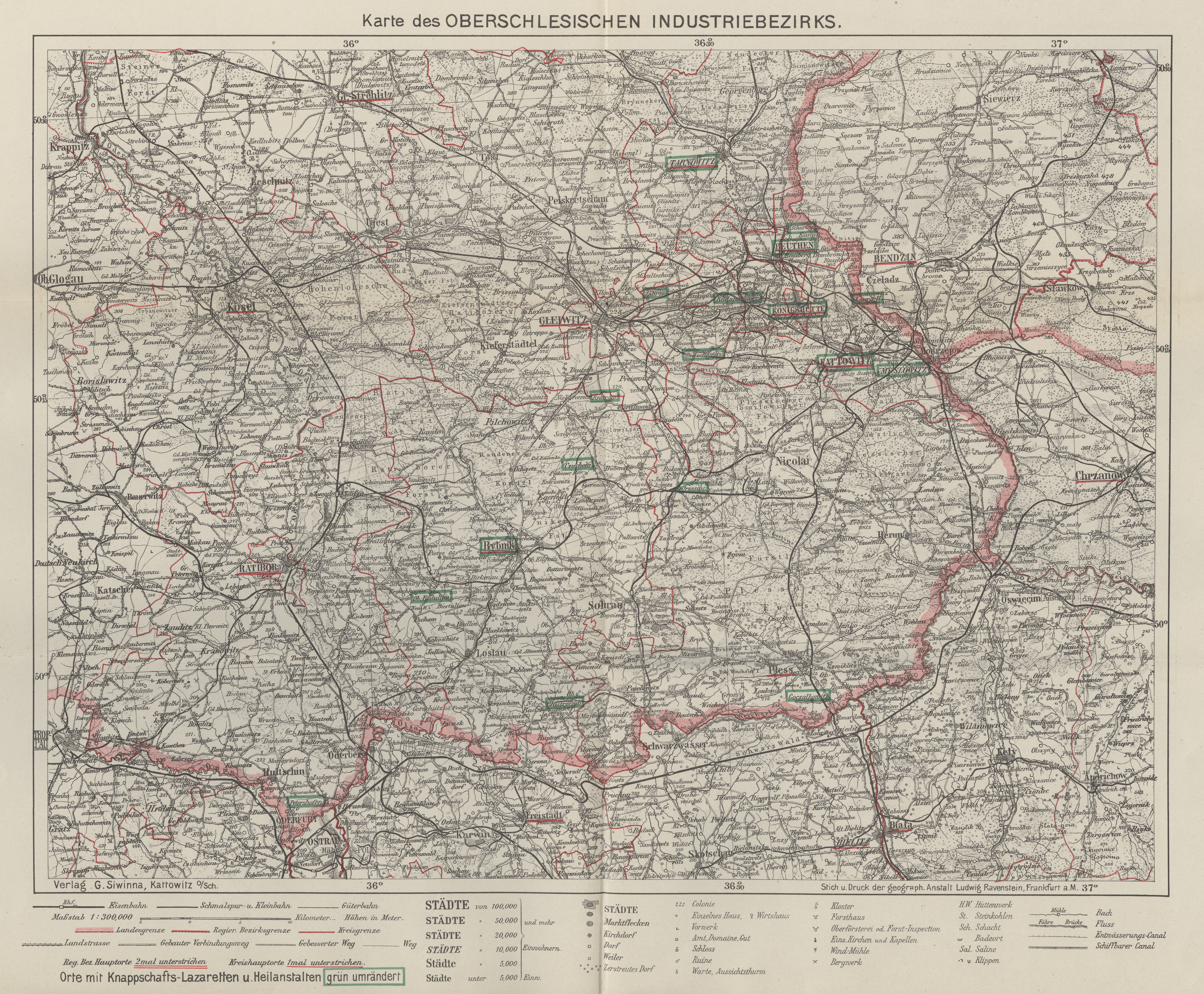
Map of the Upper Silesian Coal Basin published in 1910.

The Upper Silesian Coal Basin (USCB; Polish: Górnośląskie Zagłębie Węglowe, GZW, Czech: Hornoslezská uhelná pánev) is a coal basin in Silesia, in Poland and the Czech Republic.

The Basin also contains a number of other minable resources, such as methane, cadmium, lead, silver and zinc. Coal depth is approximately 1,000 meters, and contains about 70 billion tons, with good extraction potential.

Industrial areas within the Upper Silesian Coal Basin include the following:

- Upper Silesian Industrial Region (Polish: Górnośląski Okręg Przemysłowy, GOP)
- Rybnik Coal Area (Polish: Rybnicki Okręg Węglowy, ROW)
- Ostrava-Karviná Coal Area (Czech: Ostravsko-karvinská uhelná pánev)

The Upper Silesian Coal Basin lies in a highland, between the upper Vistula and the upper Oder rivers. It is located mainly in the Silesian Voivodeship in Poland as well as extending into the Moravian-Silesian Region in the Czech Republic.

The Upper Silesian Coal Basin includes the Katowice-Ostrava metropolitan area and has a population of 5,294,000 (with 4,311,000 in Poland and 983,000 in the Czech Republic). Area: 5,400 km² (in Poland - 4,500 km², in Czech Republic - 900 km²) or 5,600 km².

== See also ==
- Coal mining in Poland
- Bielsko Industrial Region covering the ends of Upper Silesian Coal Basin

== Literature ==
- (in Polish and English) "Historia badań i stan rozpoznania hydrogeologicznego Górnośląskiego Zagłębia Węglowego" / "History and State of Hydrological Investigations of the Upper Silesian Coal Basin" - Andrzej Różkowski, University of Silesia, Katowice 2008, ISBN 978-83-226-1759-5
- (in Polish) "Geologia i bogactwa mineralne Górnego Śląska i obszarów przyległych" - Wiesław Gabzdyl & Marian Gorol, Silesian University of Technology 2009, ISBN 978-83-7335-561-3
