= Katowice–Ostrava metropolitan area =

Katowice–Ostrava metropolitan area aglomeracja katowicko-ostrawska katovicko-ostravská aglomerace

- Location in Europe
- Coordinates: 50°05′N 18°45′E
- Country: Poland, Czech Republic
- Region: Silesian Voivodeship (Poland), Moravian-Silesian Region (Czech Republic)
- Largest cities: Ostrava; Katowice; Sosnowiec; Gliwice; Zabrze; Bielsko-Biała; Bytom; Rybnik

Area
  - Metro: 5,400 km^{2} (2,100 sq mi)

Population (2015)
  - Metro: 5,008,000
  - Metro density: 930/km^{2} (2,400/sq mi)

GDP
  - Metro: €75.0 billion (2021)
- Time zone: UTC+1 (CET)

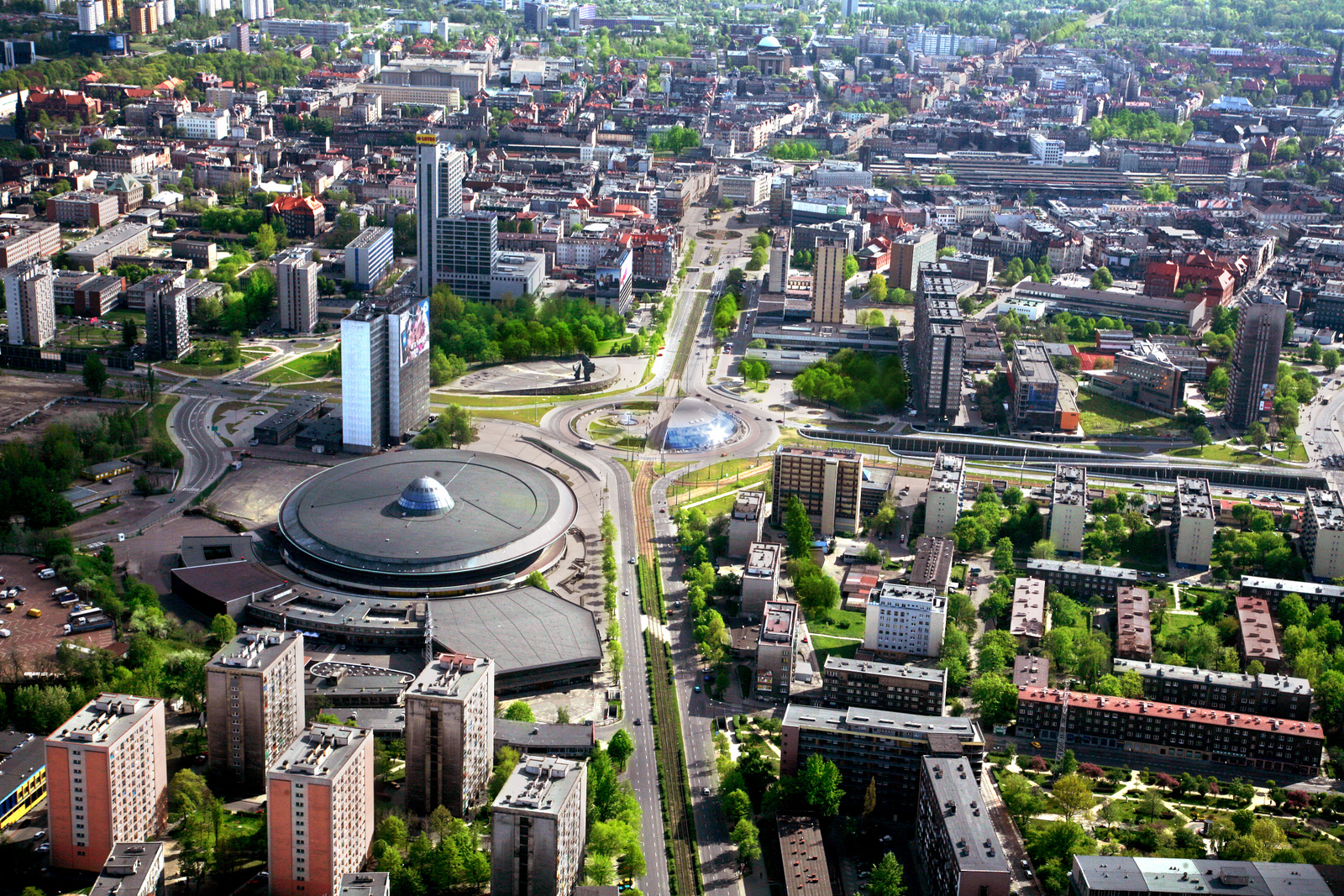
Katowice in Silesian Voivodeship (Poland), the biggest city of the largest urban area in the Upper Silesian metropolitan area.

The Katowice–Ostrava metropolitan area (also known as Upper Silesian-Moravian metropolitan area^{[a]} or Upper Silesian urban-industrial agglomeration) is a polycentric metropolitan area in southern Poland and northeastern Czech Republic, centered on the cities of Katowice and Ostrava, and has around 5 million inhabitants. Geographically, it is located mainly in Upper Silesia, with small parts of the area also in the historical regions of Moravia and Lesser Poland. Administratively, it is located in the three administrative units (NUTS-2 class): mainly Silesian Voivodeship and a small western part of Lesser Poland Voivodeship in Poland, and also a small eastern part of Moravian-Silesian Region in the Czech Republic.

The metropolitan area lies within the Upper Silesian Coal Basin. The Upper Silesian metropolitan area (5.3 million people), together with nearby Kraków metropolitan area (1.3 million people) and Częstochowa metropolitan area (0.4 million people), create a greater Kraków-Katowice-Ostrava metropolitan region covering 7 million people.

== Cooperation ==
Contrary to most other European cross-border polycentric metropolitan regions, in 2010 Katowice–Ostrava was found to have no established cross-border cooperation project, structure, or institution of metropolitan ambition. On 30 September 2026, the president of Katowice and the primátor of Ostrava have signed a memorandum on common development of the transborder metropolitan area, however, it didn't create any new administrative structure nor legally binding obligations.

== Demographics ==
Upper Silesian metropolitan area has a population of 5,294,000 (2002), with 4,311,000 (81.43%) in Poland (the Upper Silesian polycentric metropolitan area) and 982,000 (18.57%) in the Czech Republic (Ostrava Functional Urban Area). According to Polish Scientific Publishers (PWN) area is 5,400 km², with 4,500 km² (83.33%) in Poland and 900 km² (16.67%) in the Czech Republic. According to the Brookings Institution, area has a population of 5,008,000 (2015).

The area consists of several Functional Urban Areas (FUA), each of which is defined as a core Morphological Urban Area (MUA) based on population density plus the surrounding labour pool, i.e. a metropolitan area. This area contains the following FUAs:

- Katowice FUA: 3,029,000; within Upper Silesian Industrial Region
- Ostrava-Cieszyn FUA: 1,046,000; within Ostrava-Karviná coal basin
- Bielsko-Biała FUA: 584,000; within Bielsko Industrial Region
- Rybnik FUA and Racibórz FUA: 634,000 (526,000 + 109,000); within Rybnik Coal Area

== Economy ==
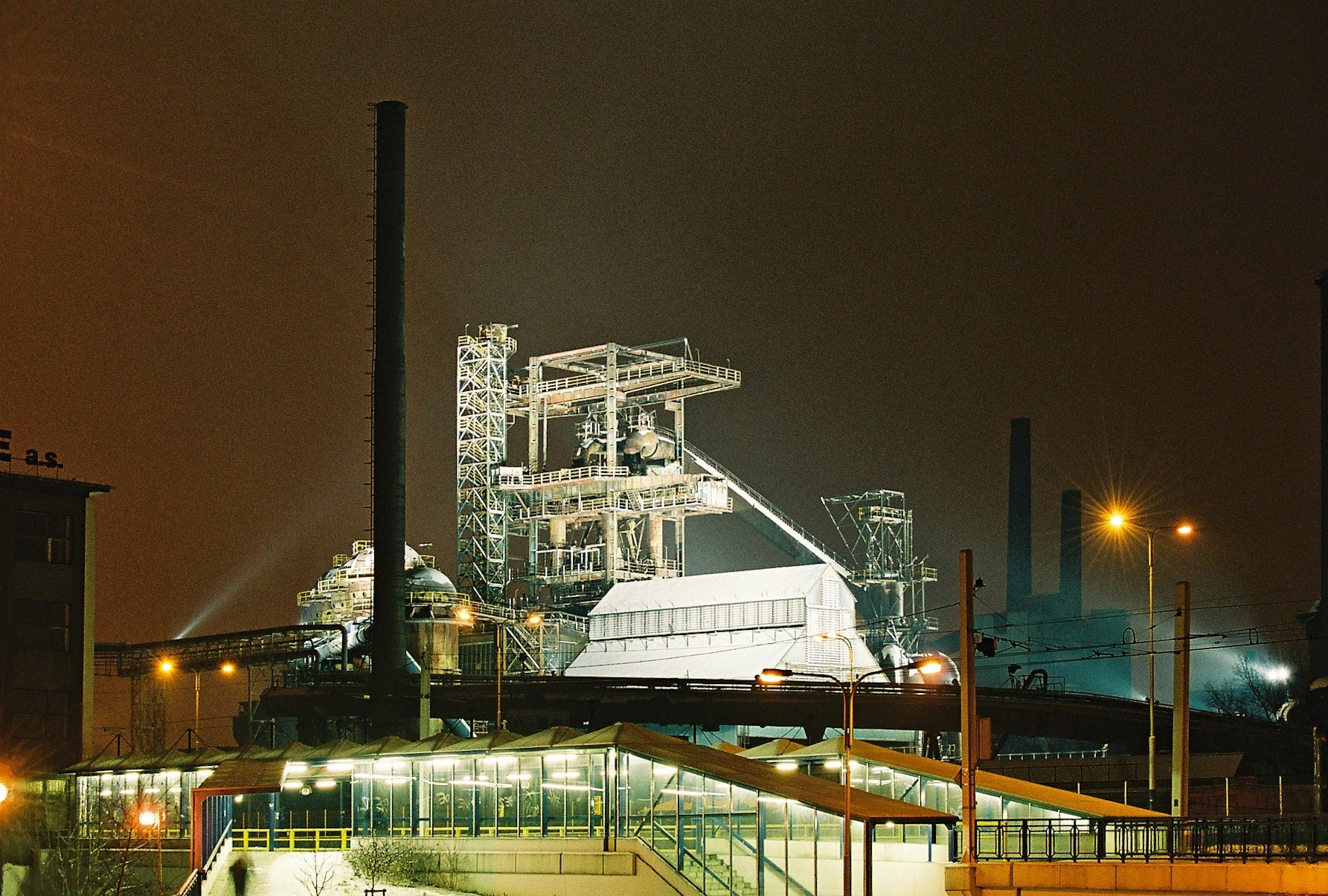
Lower Vítkovice in Ostrava (Czech Republic), a former mining complex, today a national site of industrial heritage including Bolt Tower

Historically, most of the area was characterized by heavy industry since the age of industrialisation in the late 19th and early 20th century. In addition to coal, Upper Silesia also contains a number of other minable resources (methane, cadmium, lead, silver and zinc). About 70 billion tons of coal resources are available up to a depth of 1000 meters and the conditions for extraction are good.

== Transport ==
=== Air transport ===
Two international airports – Katowice Airport and Leoš Janáček Airport Ostrava – serve the area.

=== Rail transport ===
High-speed rail link between Katowice and Ostrava is scheduled to be completed by the year 2035. It will cut down the travel time between the two cities from 105 to 37 minutes.

Regional trains are operated by Silesian Railways, most importantly serving Katowice, Rybnik, Racibórz, Bielsko-Biała, and Cieszyn in Poland, and the railway junction station in Bohumín near Ostrava in Czechia.

=== Road transport ===
Polish A1 and Czech D1 motorways connect the urban areas of Katowice, Rybnik and Ostrava. Bielsko-Biała is linked with Cieszyn/Český Těšín and Frýdek-Místek by the Polish Expressway S52 and Czech D48 motorway, while connection to Katowice urban area via Expressway S1 is in construction.

== Notes ==
ESPON used in "ESPON project 1.4.3" two almost identical names: Upper Silesian-Moravian metropolitan area and Silesian-Moravian polycentric metropolitan area.

== See also ==
- Rhine-Ruhr metropolitan region
