= Upper Silesian–Dąbrowa Basin Metropolis =

Metropolis GZM Górnośląsko-Zagłębiowska Metropolia (Polish)
- Metropolitan association
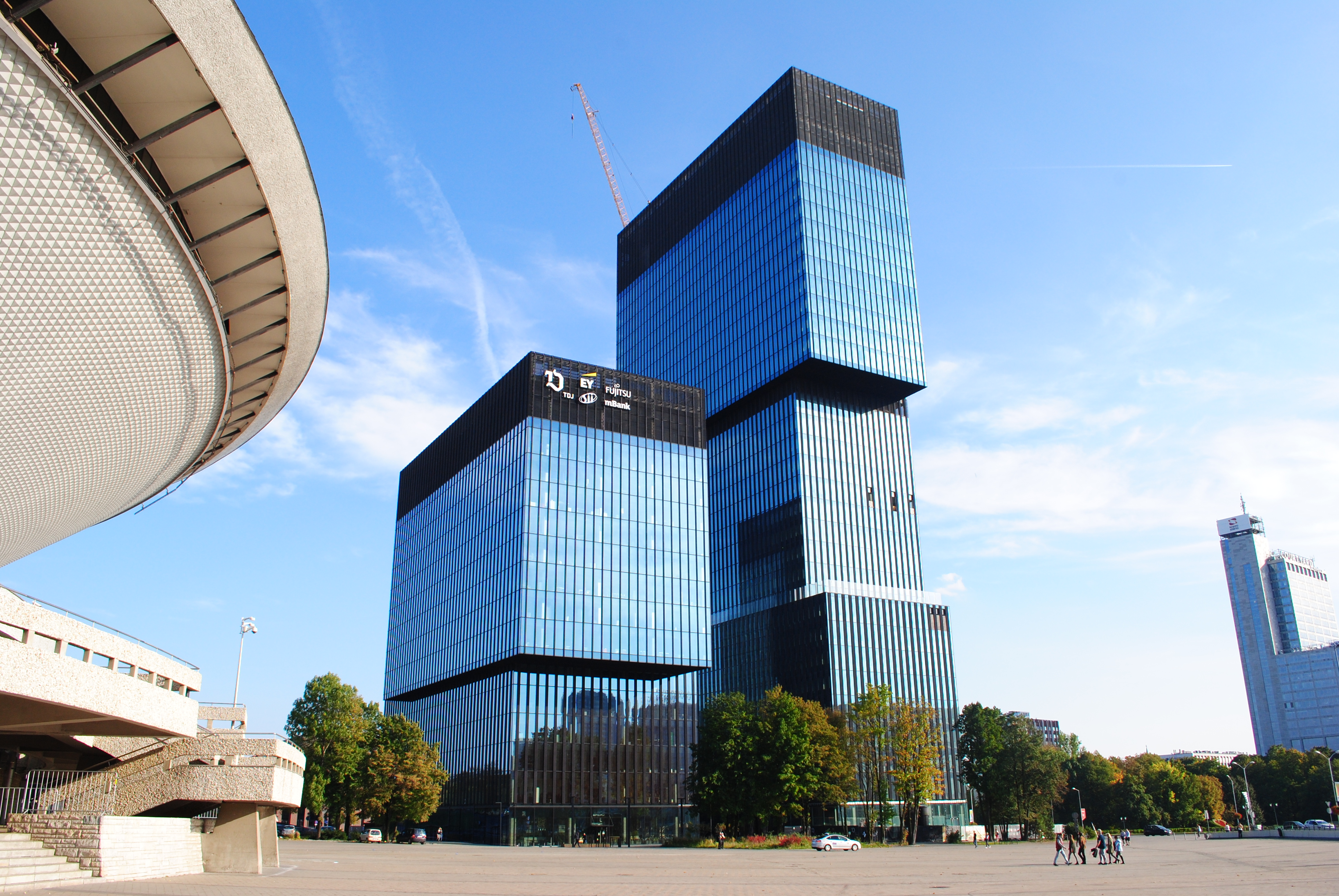
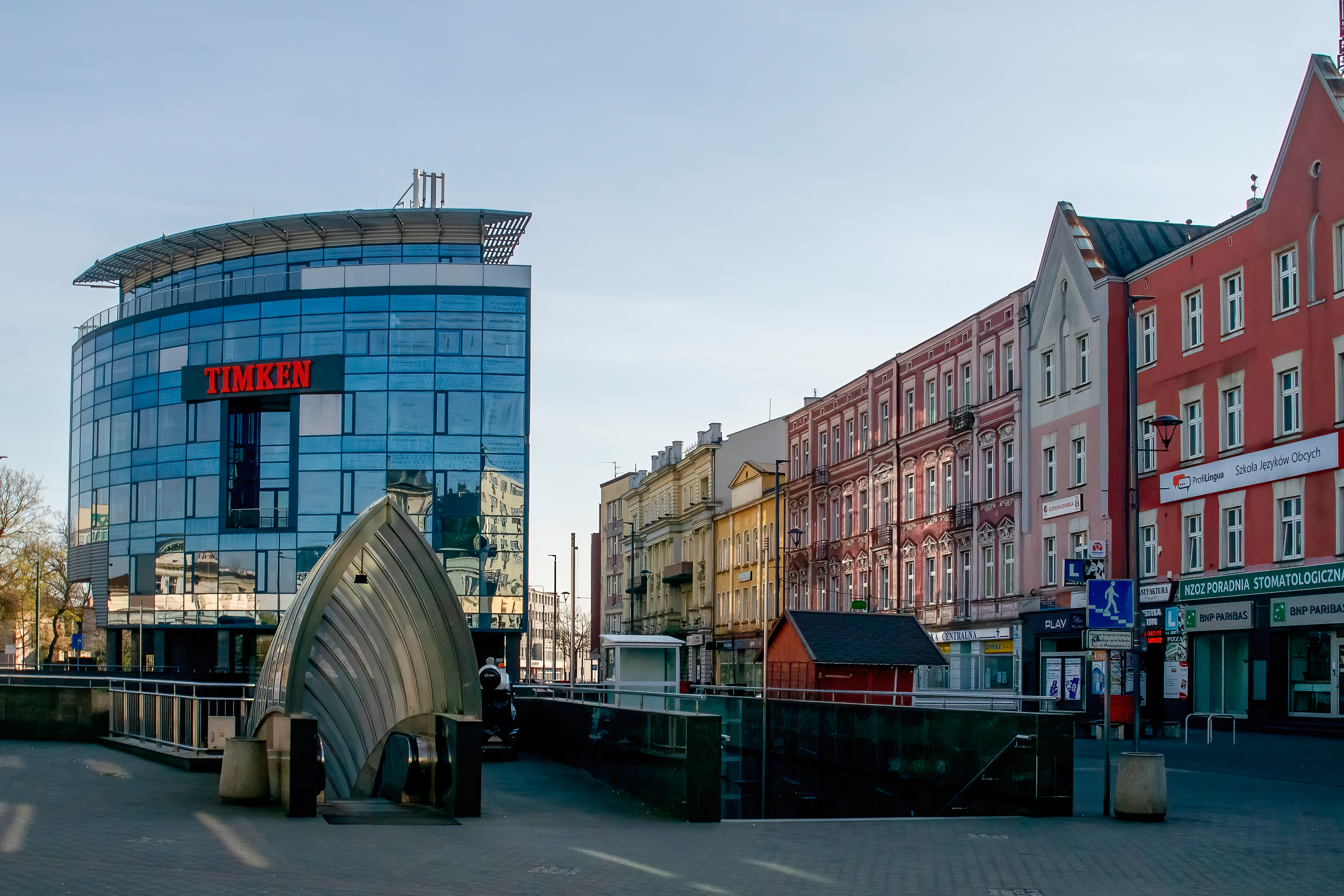
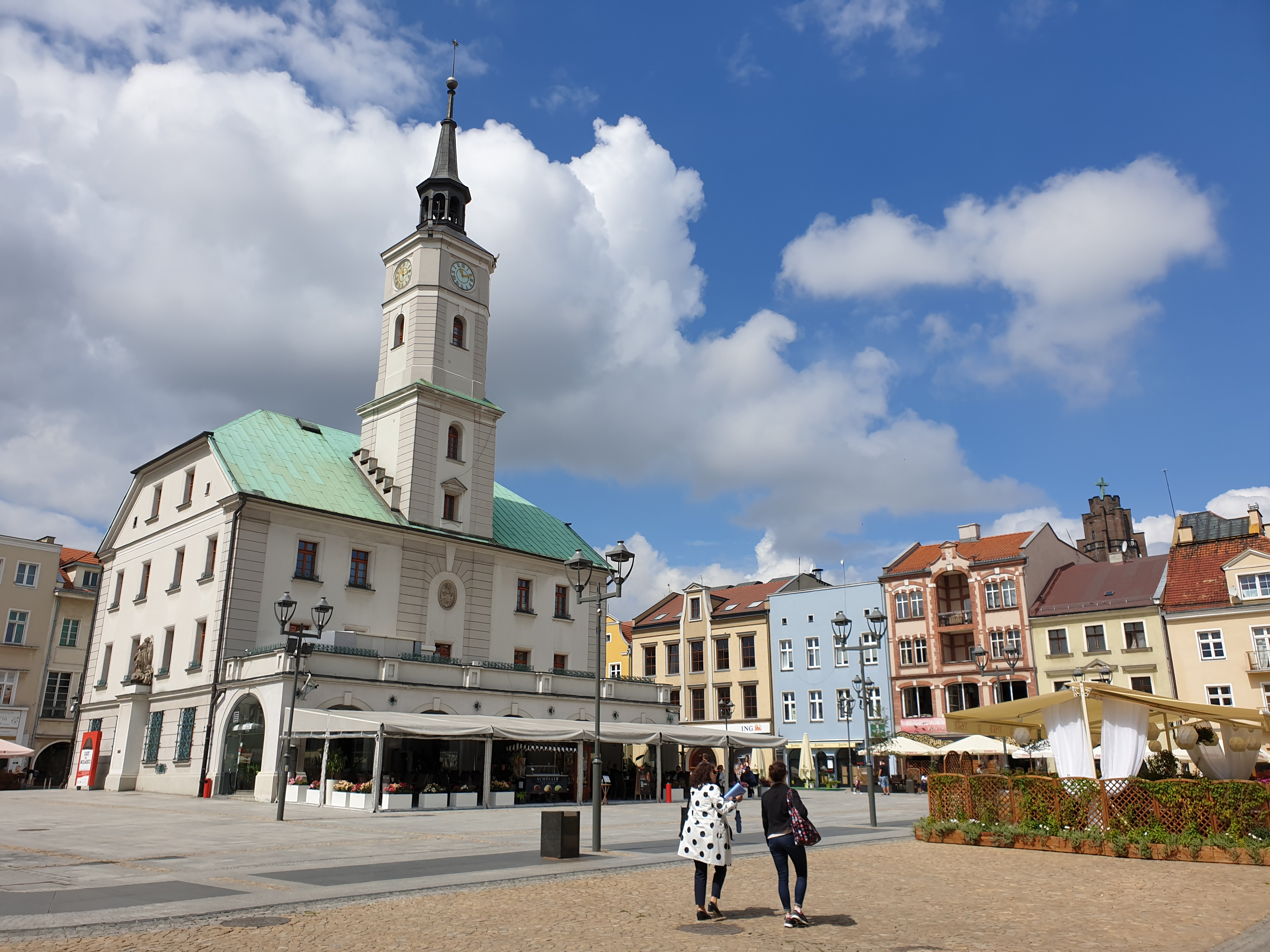
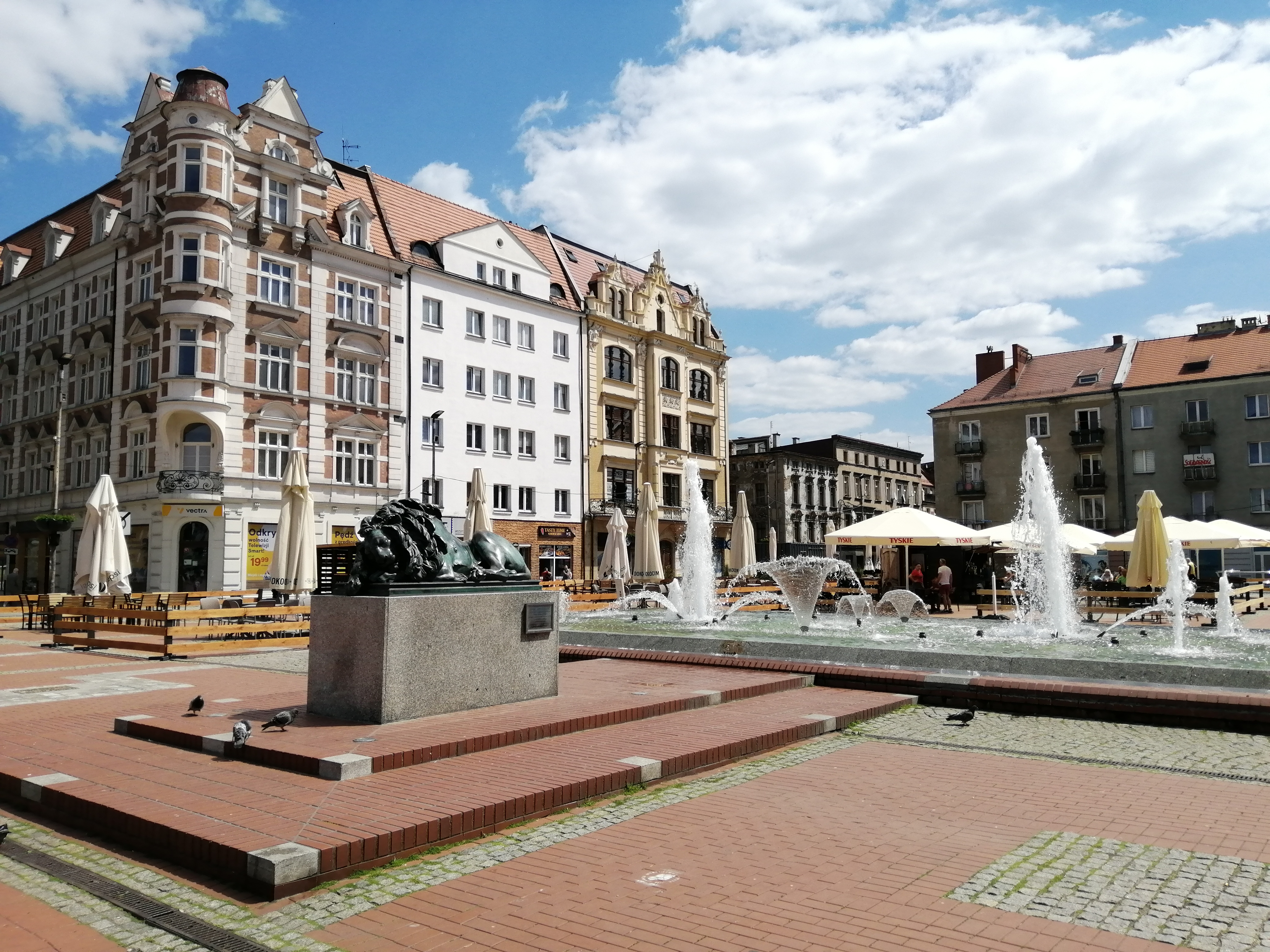
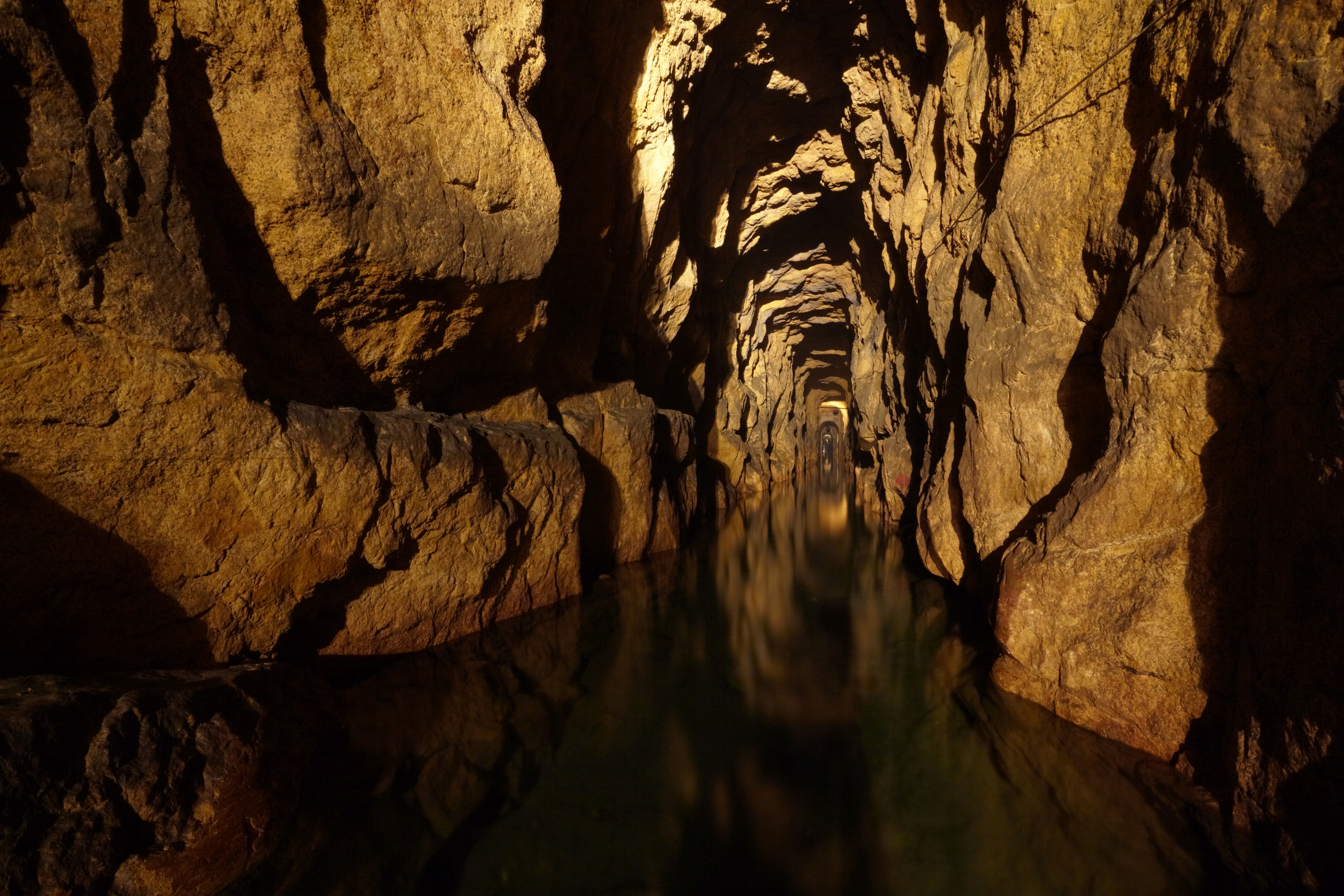
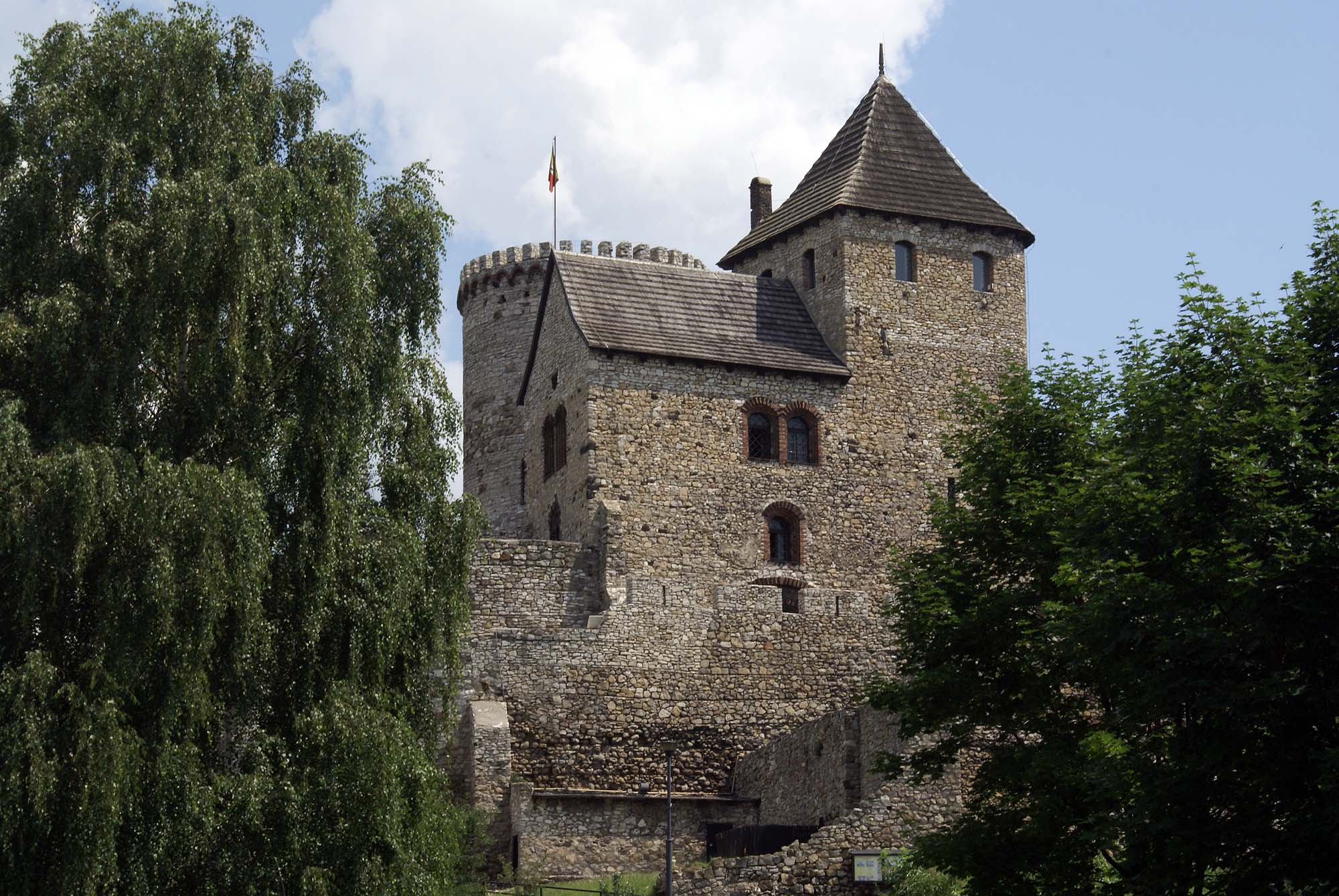
- From top, left to right: KTW buildings in Katowice; Plac Stulecia (Centennial Square) in Sosnowiec; Market Square and City Hall in Gliwice; Market Square in Bytom; Historic Silver Mine in Tarnowskie Góry; Royal Castle in Będzin

- Wordmark

- Location on the map of Poland
- Country: Poland
- Voivodeship: Silesian

Government
  - Body: Management Board of Metropolis GZM
  - Chair of the Management Board: Kazimierz Karolczak
  - Chair of the Assembly: Marcin Krupa

Area
  - Total: 2,554 km^{2} (986 sq mi)

Population (2023)
  - Total: 2,128,034
  - Density: 833.2/km^{2} (2,158/sq mi)

GDP
  - Total: €44.570 billion (2021)
  - Per capita: €20,800 (2021)
- Time zone: UTC+01:00 (CET)
  - Summer (DST): UTC+02:00 (CEST)
- Area code: +48 32
- Website: metropoliagzm.pl

The Metropolis GZM (Polish: Metropolia GZM, formally in Polish Górnośląsko-Zagłębiowska Metropolia (Upper Silesian-Dąbrowa Basin Metropolis) is a metropolitan association (Polish: związek metropolitalny) composed of 41 contiguous gminas, with a total population of over 2 million, covering most of the Katowice metropolitan area in the Silesian Voivodeship of Poland. The seat of metropolitan administration is Katowice, the largest member city and the voivodeship capital.

== Purpose ==
The purpose of the metropolis is to maintain a strong urban and industrially developed area with internationally competitive profile and unified management of all infrastructure. By law, it is obligated to carry out tasks in the areas of spatial order, socioeconomic development, public transport planning, and promotion. For these tasks, the metropolis receives 5% of the income tax of its residents and participating municipalities.

Member gminas can also cede selected statutory tasks onto the Metropolis, but have to provide the financing for their execution.

== History ==
Metropolis GZM was created in June 2017 act of Parliament, with its boundaries defined by a regulation of Poland's Council of Ministers. It effectively replaced the earlier existing Metropolitan Association of Upper Silesia (Polish: Górnośląski Związek Metropolitalny), which was discontinued at the end of 2017. That original union was formed ten years earlier in Świętochłowice by 14 core cities of Katowice urban area.

== Governance ==
The Metropolis GZM is represented by two administrative bodies: the Management Board and the Assembly.

The Management Board is the executive branch, which consists of 5 members elected by the Assembly using a secret ballot method – the Chairperson, two Deputy Chairpersons, and two other regular members. Thanks to gentlemen's agreement, each of the five NUTS 3 regions on the area of the Metropolis is represented.

The Assembly is the legislative branch, consisting of heads of 41 constituent gminas. The Assembly adopts resolutions by means of double majority – more than half of delegates representing more than half of Metropolis population must vote in favour. The Assembly also elects its Bureau – the Chairperson and up to three Deputy Chairpersons.

== Location ==
The Metropolis GZM spans urban and suburban communities in the historical regions of Upper Silesia (the South-Eastern part of Silesia) as well as Lesser Poland's Zagłębie Dąbrowskie in the modern Silesian Voivodeship in southern Poland, within the northern portion of the Upper Silesian Coal Basin between the Vistula and Oder rivers. It is located roughly 72 km West of Kraków and 260 km South-West of Warsaw. Other major population centers in relative proximity to the metropolis include: Ostrava (70 km), Vienna (290 km), Prague (320 km) and Bratislava (270 km).

== Transportation ==
=== Road transportation ===
The Metropolis GZM has its own metropolitan bus system and an extensive road network, including national highways A4 and A1, as well as S1 and S86 expressways. Warsaw is connected to the agglomeration through National Road no. 1, commonly known as Gierkówka (after Edward Gierek). The agglomeration is also connected to the Beskid Mountains in the south through two extensions of Gierkówka—National Road no. 1 and National Road no. 81. Drogowa Trasa Średnicowa, an inter-urban, limited-access expressway, connects Gliwice and Katowice city centers. The GZM observes some of the highest traffic in Poland, with S86 between Katowice and Sosnowiec hosting 112,212 vehicles per day and A4 highway in Katowice seeing 100,983 vehicles per day.

=== Rail transportation ===
The agglomeration boasts the highest density of railway lines in Poland. Katowice Train Station is the 8th busiest passenger station in the country, handling 11.9 million passengers in 2017 (up from 10.6 million in 2014), which corresponds to 32,800 passengers per day. Gliwice is the second-busiest station in the metropolis, with 10,300 passengers per day.

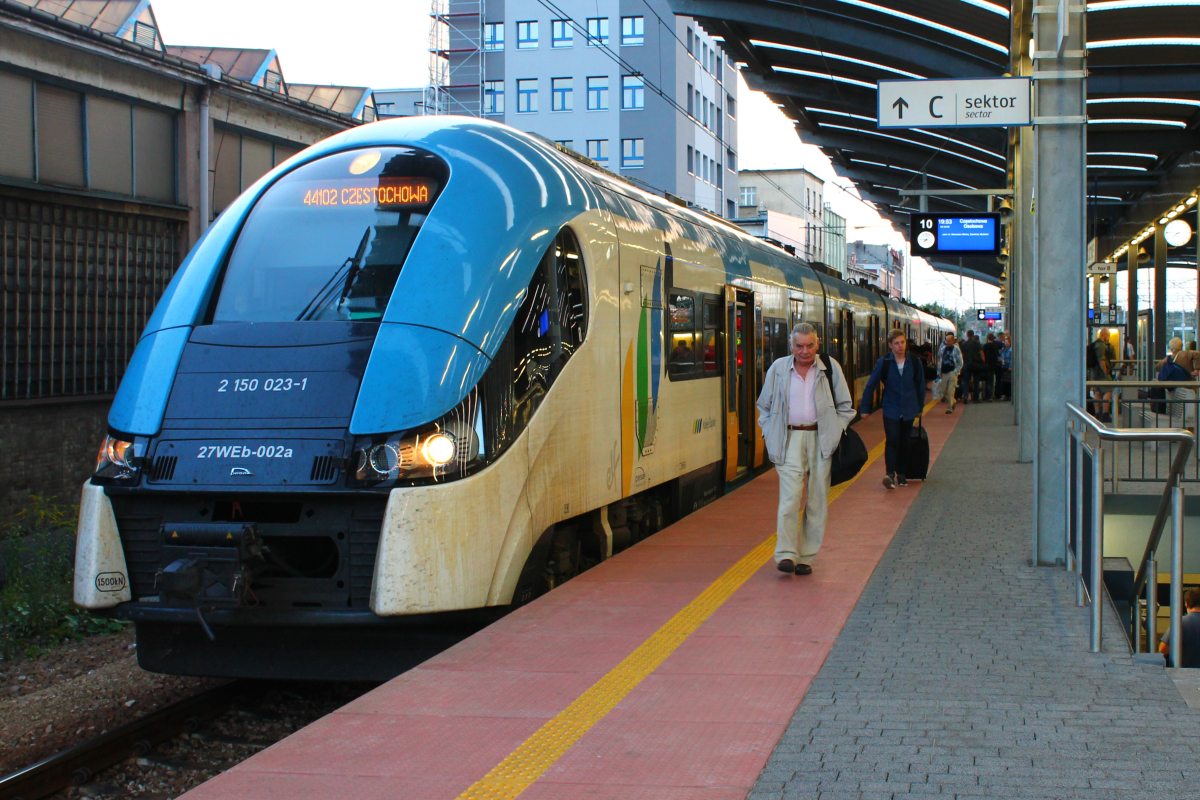
Pesa Elf of Silesian Railways in Katowice

Regional and metropolitan trains are operated by Silesian Railways. Most national and international trains are operated by Polish State Railways. Gliwice and Katowice are connected to Warsaw by a fast Express Intercity Premium train (commonly called Pendolino, after the train model that operates this line). Other major cities to which the metropolis is directly connected to by trains include Berlin, Prague, Vienna, Budapest and Bratislava.

A large tram interurban network called the Silesian Interurbans still exists today connecting the urban areas of the Upper Silesia and Dąbrowa Basin. It is one of the largest interurban networks in Europe.

=== Air transportation ===
Katowice Airport serves as the primary airport for the metropolis, and is located approximately 30 km (19 mi) north of downtown Katowice. Katowice Airport is the fourth-busiest airport in Poland in terms of passenger traffic, handling 4.8 million passengers in 2018. It is also second-busiest cargo airport in the country, serving 18,543 tonnes in 2018. It is a base for Wizz Air, Ryanair Sun, Blue Panorama Airlines, Enter Air, Smartwings, and Smartwings Poland. LOT Polish Airlines base some of their aircraft in Katowice during the summer season.

The airport has daily feeder flights to Warsaw-Chopin (by LOT Polish Airlines, 4 flights), Frankfurt Airport (3 flights) and Munich Airport (1 flight, by Lufthansa). Other major cities with connections to Katowice Airport include London, Dubai, Amsterdam, Milan, Dublin, Rome, Barcelona, Lisbon, Stockholm, Athens, Kyiv and Tel Aviv. In total, there are 61 regular and 44 charter destinations.

The Metropolis GZM is also within close (60 km) proximity of Kraków Airport, which is the second-busiest airport in Poland (6.8 million passengers in 2018).

== Participating municipalities ==
Map of municipalities forming the metropolis

Original union included only the 14 cities with powiat rights that form the urban core of the metropolitan area: (Bytom, Chorzów, Dąbrowa Górnicza, Gliwice, Jaworzno, Katowice, Mysłowice, Piekary Śląskie, Ruda Śląska, Siemianowice Śląskie, Sosnowiec, Świętochłowice, Tychy, and Zabrze.

The original union could not accept more members for legal reasons, because under Polish law at that time, only cities with powiat rights could form such union. This changed in 2017 when the Polish government created a new law designed specifically for this area's needs.

Currently, 41 gminas form the metropolis. Jaworzno, which was the founding member of the original union, decided not to join the new body, citing an unwillingness to merge its public transportation subsidiary company with the metropolitan one as the main reason.

Upper Silesia

- Bieruń
- Bojszowy
- Bytom
- Chełm Śląski
- Chorzów
- Gierałtowice
- Gliwice
- Imielin
- Katowice
- Knurów
- Kobiór
- Lędziny
- Łaziska Górne
- Mikołów
- Mysłowice
- Piekary Śląskie
- Pilchowice
- Pyskowice
- Radzionków
- Ruda Śląska
- Rudziniec
- Siemianowice Śląskie
- Sośnicowice
- Świerklaniec
- Świętochłowice
- Tarnowskie Góry
- Tychy
- Wyry
- Zabrze
- Zbrosławice

Dąbrowa Basin

- Będzin
- Bobrowniki
- Czeladź
- Dąbrowa Górnicza
- Mierzęcice
- Ożarowice
- Psary
- Siewierz
- Sławków
- Sosnowiec
- Wojkowice

== Name ==
Logo of the metropolis featuring its official name in Polish

The official name of the metropolis is "Górnośląsko-Zagłębiowska Metropolia" (Upper Silesian-Dąbrowa Basin Metropolis"). This name was used on the official petition to create a metropolis, and later was used by the Polish Ministry of Interior in the final legal act published on 30 June 2017.

Previous name proposals included:

- Metropolia Katowice (Katowice Metropolis), first reported by regional newspaper Dziennik Zachodni but dismissed by mayors of other cities
- Metropolia Górnośląska (Upper Silesian Metropolis), protested by mayors of Sosnowiec and Dąbrowa Górnicza as excluding the Dąbrowa Basin aspect of the area
- Metropolia Silesia (Silesia Metropolis), used by the original union itself and commonly used in media but protested by scholars who asked that the metropolis does not assume the name of the entire region. Additionally, similarly to Upper Silesian Metropolis, communities from Dąbrowa Basin part of the area complained it ignores their history.

== Budget ==
Pursuant to the law, the Metropolis receives 5% of the PIT from persons residing in its territory. In addition, a contribution is established for the municipalities included in its composition.

In 2017, the budget of the Metropolis amounted to PLN 12,306,418. In 2018, the budget amounted to PLN 361,053,107.

== Population ==
The Metropolis is inhabited by over 2.2 million people. The population of the cities and gminas comprising the metropolis, as well as the entire voivodeship, has been steadily decreasing since 1989, mainly due to natural decrease and negative migration balance.

== Economy ==
In 2020 Katowice's gross metropolitan product was €39 billion. This puts Katowice in 60th place among cities in European Union.
