= Rybnik Coal Area =

Upper Silesian Agglomeration

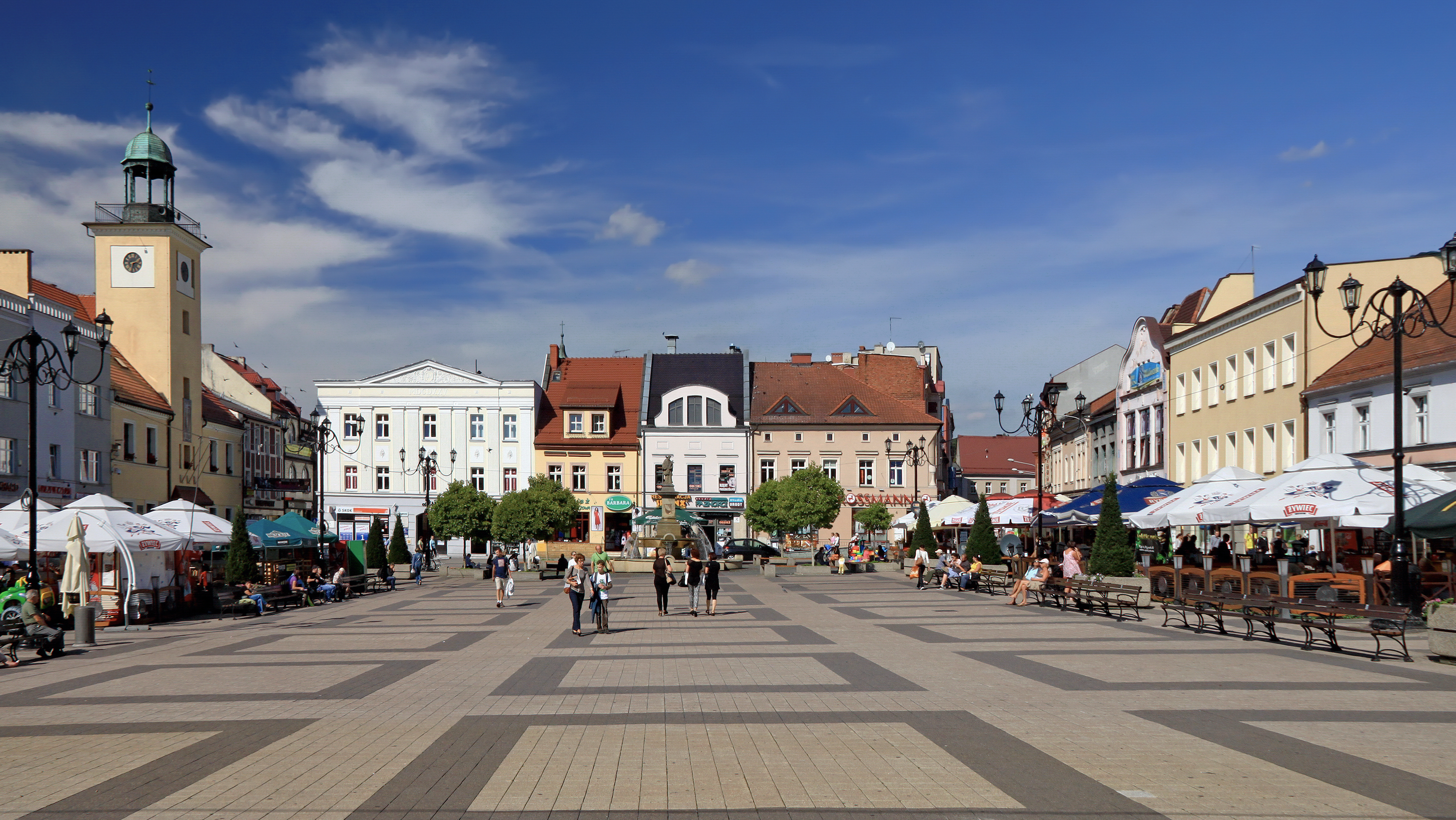
Rybnik Wodzisław Śląski Jastrzębie-Zdrój Żory Racibórz Rydułtowy Pszów Radlin

The Rybnik Coal Area (Polish: Rybnicki Okręg Węglowy, ROW) is an industrial region in southern Poland. It is located in the Silesian Voivodeship, in a basin between the Vistula and Oder rivers, sited on the Rybnik Plateau (Polish: Płaskowyż Rybnicki) between Katowice (Metropolis GZM) to the north and Ostrava on the south-west. It is part of the Katowice-Ostrava metropolitan area populated by 5,294,000 people and the Kraków-Katowice-Ostrava metropolitan region populated by about 7 million. According to scientific description by Paweł Swianiewicz and Urszula Klimska this area has 507,000 people, according to European Spatial Planning Observation Network - 634,000 people (525,000 + 109,000 by Racibórz). Area: about 1,300 km^{2}.

== Main cities ==
Adjacent main cities and statistics (30 June 2009):

City / Town	Population	Area (km^{2})	Density (km^{−2})
Rybnik	141,387	148.36	952.9
Jastrzębie-Zdrój	93,455	88.62	1,054.5
Żory	61,982	64.59	959.6
Racibórz	56,675	74.96	756.0
Wodzisław Śląski	49,386	49.62	995.2
Rydułtowy	21,833	14.95	1,460.4
Radlin	17,673	12.53	1,410.4
Pszów	13,753	20.42	673.5
Total	456,144	474.05	962.2

== Area ==
Adjacent county (powiat) and statistics (30 June 2009):

County	Population	Area (km^{2})	Density (km^{2})
Wodzisław County	155,733	286.92	541.0
Rybnik city-county	141,387	148.36	952.9
Racibórz County	110,557	543.98	204.9
Jastrzębie-Zdrój city-county	93,455	88.62	1,054.5
Rybnik County	74,331	224.63	327.3
Żory city-county	61,982	64.59	959.6
Total	637,445	1,357.1	469.4

== History ==
The beginnings of ROW are related to a six-year plan and the modernization of nine old hard coal mines in the Rybnik-wodzisław region, e.g. KWK Anna or KWK Marcel. In 1952, the State Economic Planning Commission commissioned work on the preparation of a development plan for ROW. It was planned to build mines in the area of Wodzisław, Żory, Jejkowice and Kaczyce. Therefore, during the six-year plan, the old ones were modernized, but the construction of a new one, the first from scratch, of the 1 Maja Coal Mine in Wodzisław Śląski was started. In the following years, plans were started to build further new mines in ROW (Rybnik Coal Area).

== See also ==
- Metropolitan areas in Poland
- Upper Silesian Industrial Region
