= List of regions of Poland by GDP =

This article lists the NUTS-2 regions and metropolitan areas of Poland by their nominal GDP in euros. All values are rounded to the nearest million in case of GDP data and to the nearest whole number in case of GDP per capita data.

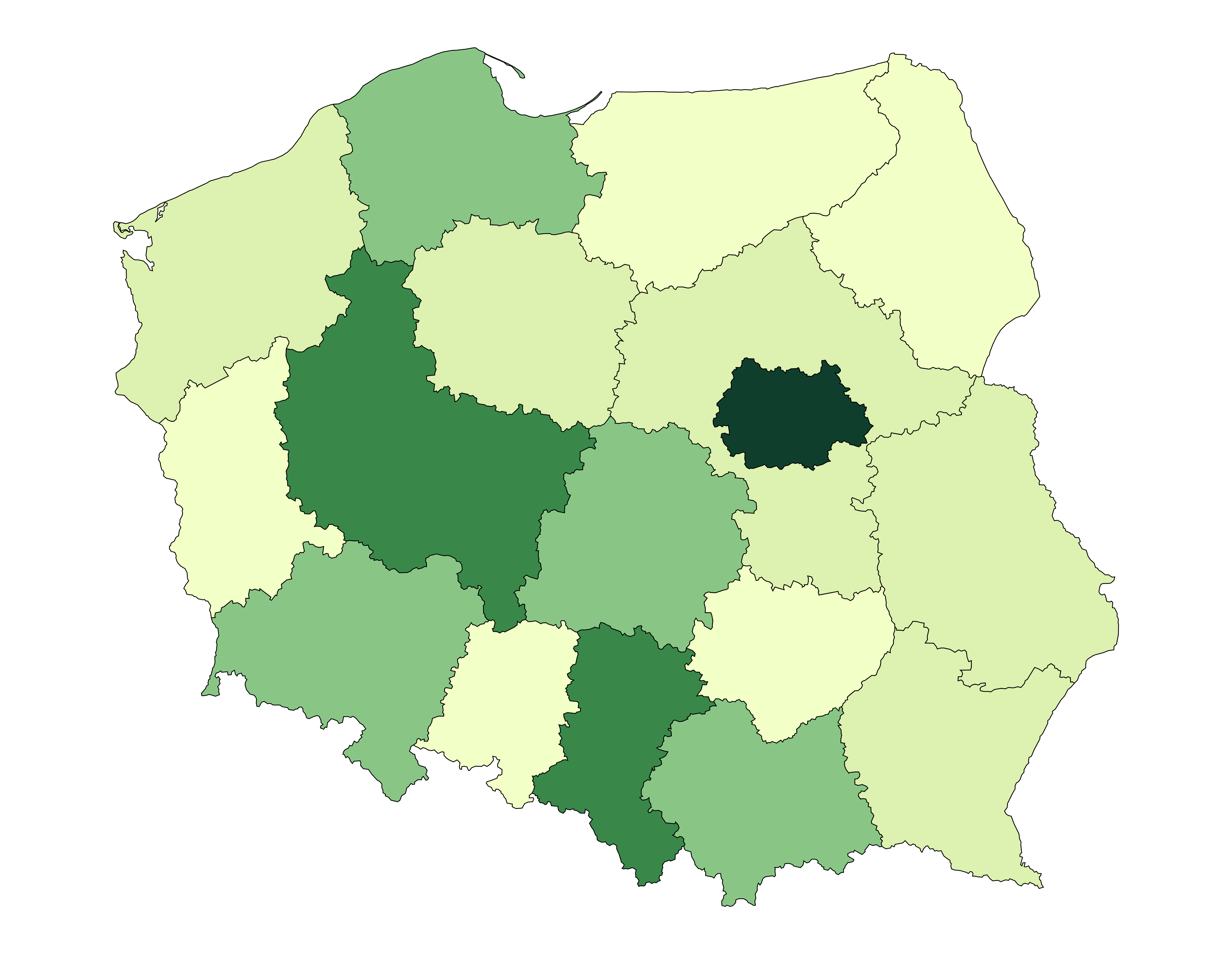
NUTS-2 regions of Poland by GDP (2024) Map key: > €150,000 mil. > €75,000 mil. > €50,000 mil. > €25,000 mil. > €15,000 mil.

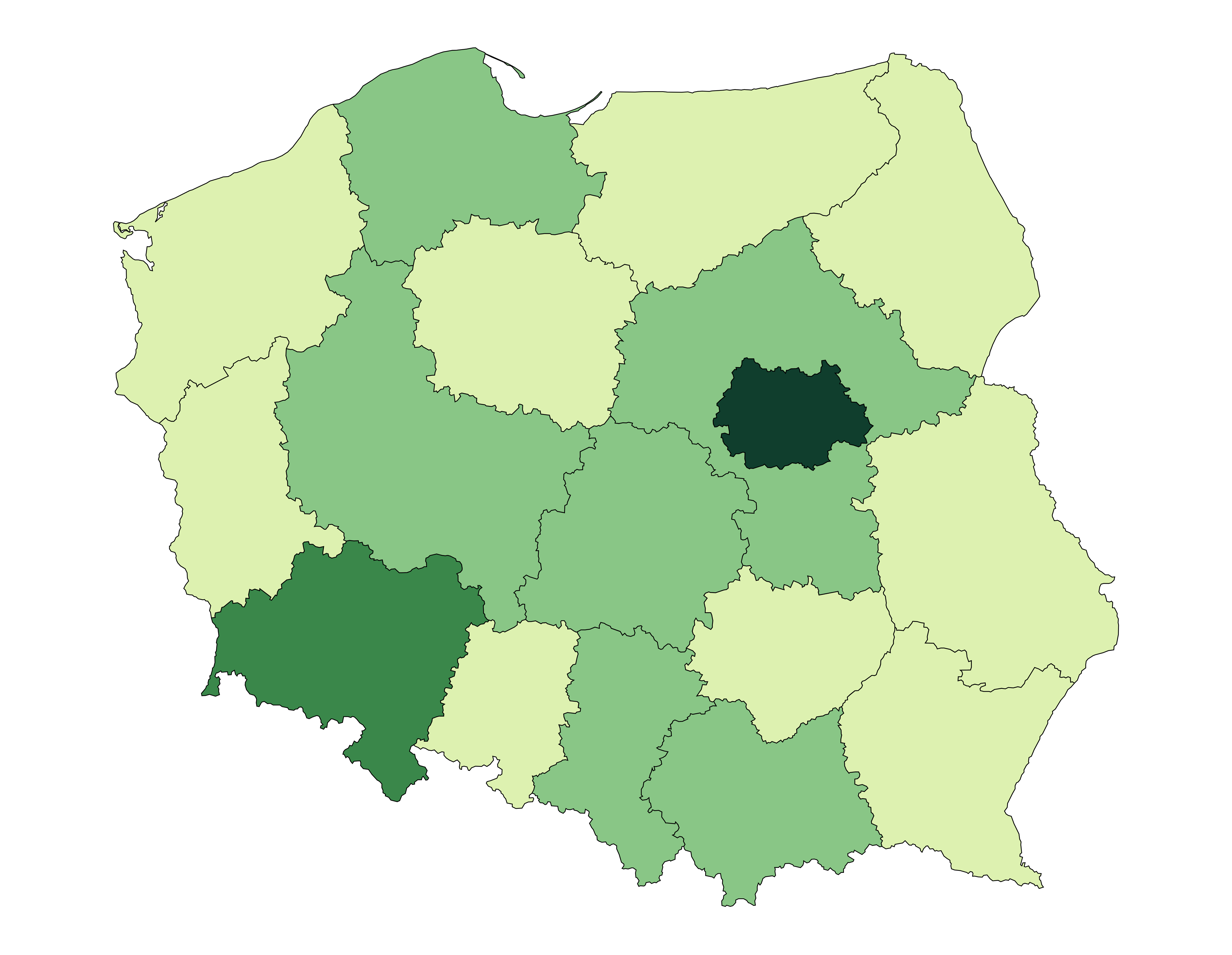
NUTS-2 regions of Poland by GDP per capita (2024) Map key: > €45,000 > €25,000 > €20,000 > €15,000

== NUTS-2 regions (2024) ==
This is a list of NUTS-2 regions of Poland by nominal GDP in euros based on Eurostat 2024 data.

All regions, except Warsaw metropolitan area and Masovian Regional, are Voivodeships of Poland.

NUTS-2 region	GDP (mil. €)	Population	GDP per capita (€)
Warsaw metropolitan area	▲156,556	▲3,281,583	▲47,707
Silesian Voivodeship	▲97,391	▼4,217,521	▲23,092
Greater Poland Voivodeship	▲83,567	▼3,438,504	▲24,303
Lower Silesian Voivodeship	▲70,200	▼2,805,463	▲25,023
Lesser Poland Voivodeship	▲69,015	▼3,318,985	▲20,794
Pomeranian Voivodeship	▲50,993	▲2,296,972	▲22,200
Łódź Voivodeship	▲50,902	▼2,327,239	▲21,872
Masovian Regional	▲46,085	▼2,198,457	▲20,962
Kuyavian-Pomeranian Voivodeship	▲35,719	▼1,931,648	▲18,491
Subcarpathian Voivodeship	▲32,683	▼1,955,368	▲16,715
Lublin Voivodeship	▲31,361	▼1,934,465	▲16,212
West Pomeranian Voivodeship	▲30,031	▼1,579,753	▲19,010
Warmian-Masurian Voivodeship	▲20,994	▼1,294,712	▲16,215
Świętokrzyskie Voivodeship	▲19,642	▼1,123,153	▲17,488
Podlaskie Voivodeship	▲19,131	▼1,078,971	▲17,730
Lubusz Voivodeship	▲17,660	▼947,784	▲18,633
Opole Voivodeship	▲16,562	▼890,392	▲18,601

== Metropolitan areas (2021) ==
This is a list of metropolitan areas of Poland by nominal GDP in euros based on Eurostat 2021 data.

Metropolitan area	GDP (mil. €)	GDP per capita (€)
Warsaw	▲99,748	▲32,100
Katowice	▲44,570	▲16,600
Kraków	▲28,742	▲18,900
Poznań	▲28,603	▲23,600
Tricity	▲23,781	▲17,500
Łódź	▲18,415	▲17,500
Wrocław	▲16,579	▲25,900
Bydgoszcz-Toruń	▲11,904	▲15,400
Lublin	▲9,764	▲13,700
Bielsko-Biała	▲9,725	▲14,600
Kielce	▲8,775	▲11,700
Opole	▲8,475	▲13,900
Rzeszów	▲8,284	▲12,800
Szczecin	▲7,173	▲18,100
Olsztyn	▲7,162	▲11,800
Częstochowa	▲6,706	▲13,300
Białystok	▲6,452	▲12,600
Radom	▲6,330	▲10,500
Tarnów	▲4,310	▲9,400

== See also ==
- Poland A and B
- List of Polish voivodeships by Human Development Index
