= Metropolis =

Large city or conurbation

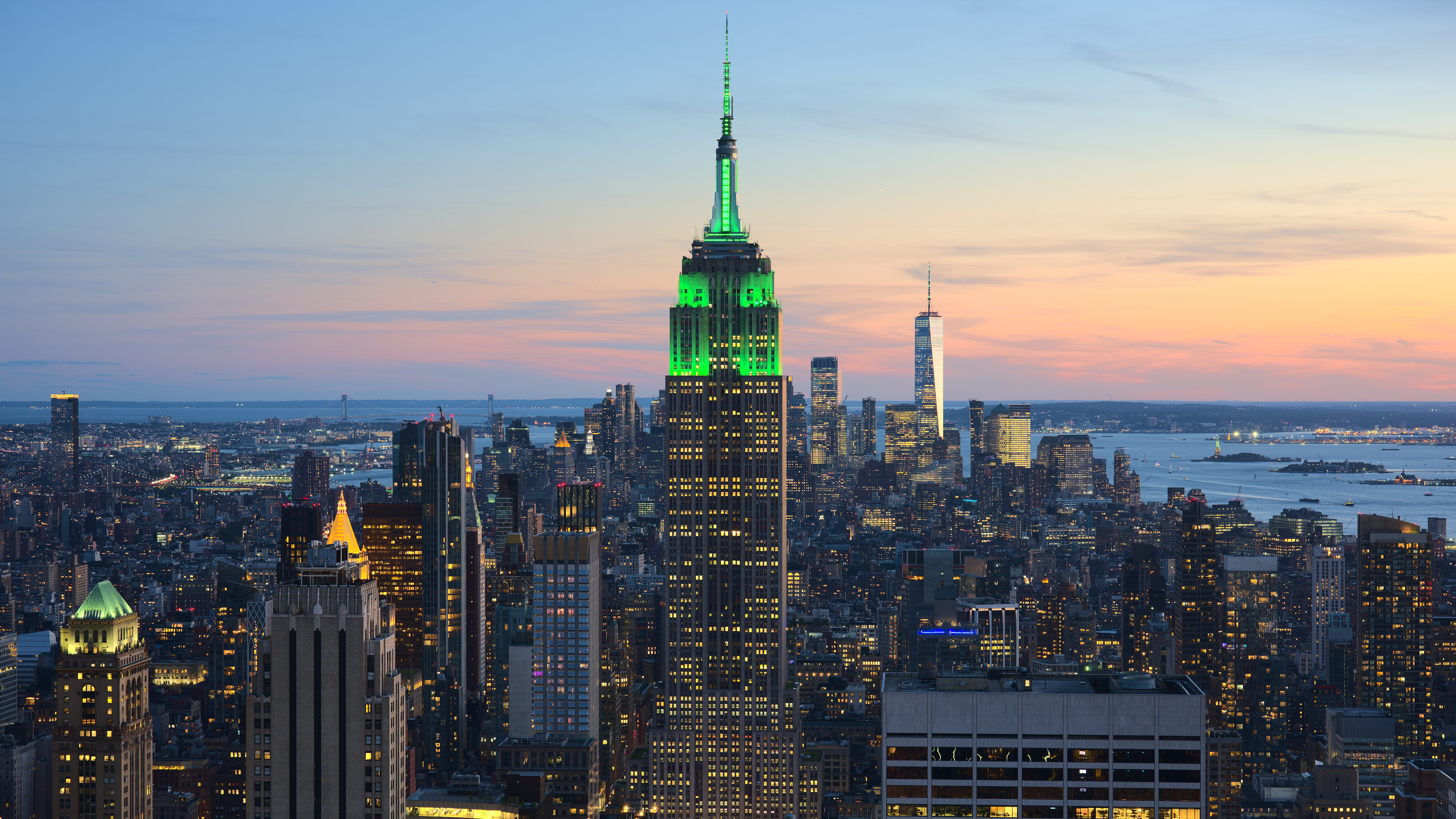
New York has garnered the nickname Metropolis to describe the city in the daytime in popular culture, contrasting with Gotham, sometimes used to describe New York at night.

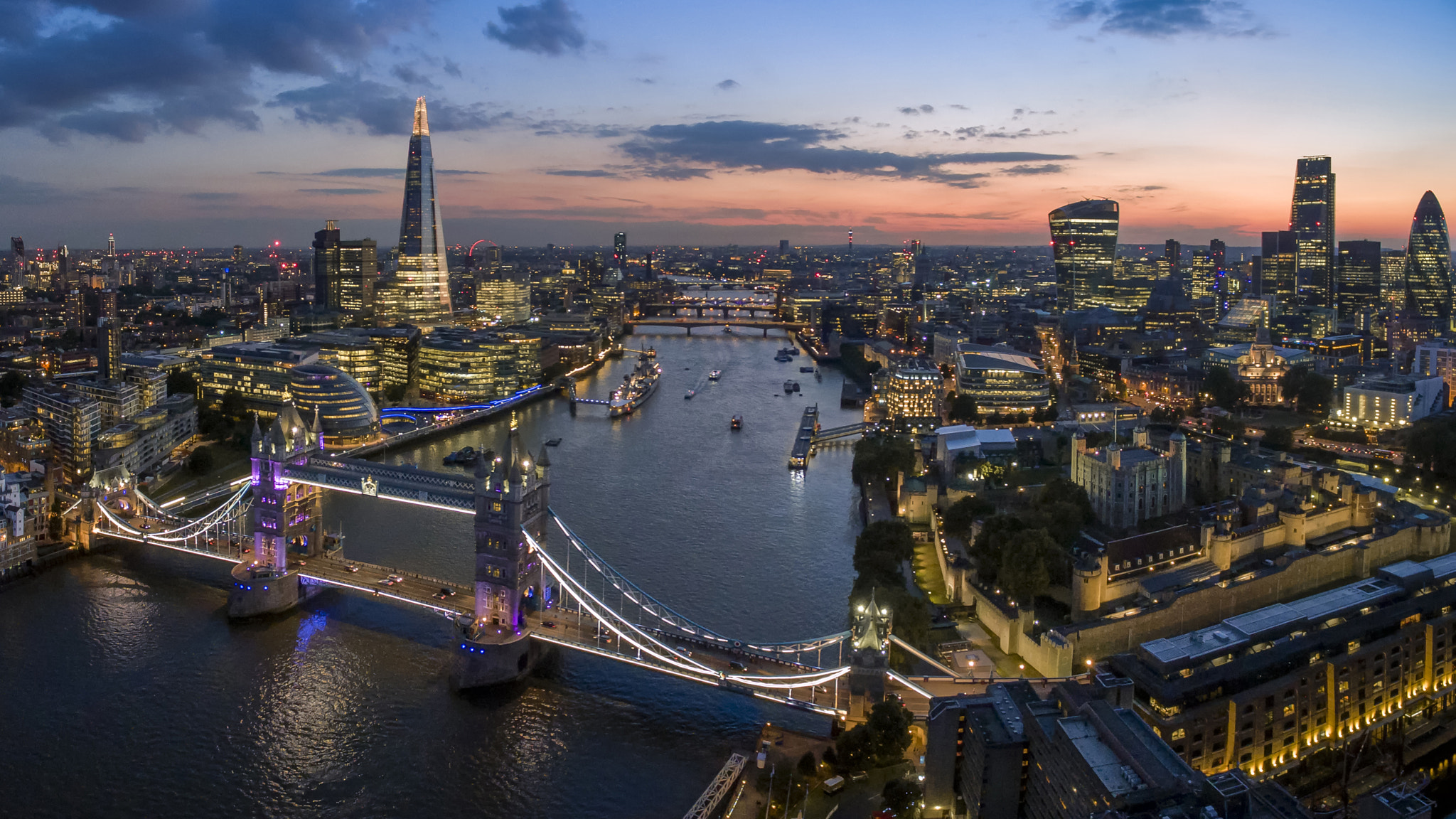
Skyline of London, which was once the metropole of the British Empire

Skyline of Jakarta, the world's most populous metropolis

A metropolis (Note: Pronounced US: /məˈtrɑːpəlɪs/ or UK: /məˈtrɒpəlɪs/; US also /mɪˈtrɒpəlɪs/) is a large city or conurbation which is a significant economic, political, and cultural area for a country or region, and an important hub for regional or international connections, commerce, and communications.

A big city belonging to a larger urban agglomeration, but which is not the core of that agglomeration, is not generally considered a metropolis but a part of it. The plural of the word is metropolises, although the Latin plural is metropoles, from the Greek metropoleis (μητρoπόλεις).

For urban areas outside metropolitan areas that generate a similar attraction on a smaller scale for their region, the concept of the regiopolis ("regio" for short) was introduced by urban and regional planning researchers in Germany in 2006.

== Etymology ==
Metropolis (μητρόπολις) is a Greek word, (plural: metropoleis) coming from μήτηρ, mḗtēr meaning "mother" and πόλις, pólis meaning "city" or "town", which is how the Greek colonies of antiquity referred to their original cities, with whom they retained cultic and political-cultural connections. The word was used in post-classical Latin for the chief city of a province, the seat of the government and, in particular, ecclesiastically for the seat or see of a metropolitan bishop to whom suffragan bishops were responsible. This usage equates the province with the diocese or episcopal see.

In a colonial context, it is the "mother city" of a colony, that is, the city which sent out settlers. The word has distant roots in the colonial past of Ancient Greece with first usage in Middle English around the 14th century. This was later generalized to a city regarded as a center of a specified activity, or any large, important city in a nation.

== Concept ==
The concept of a "metropolis" as a "mother city" dates back to at least sixth-century Canterbury, where the term was used in a religious context, but the term began to be used to describe a large secular city starting with 16th-century London. London's cultural influence meant that until the 19th century, concepts of the "metropolis" were rarely used to describe other cities, though Edinburgh was also described as a "metropolis." While metropolis can often mean any large city, the metropolis is generally understood as a city which serves as a particular function as opposed to simply being large.

Modern ideas of a metropolis have changed as modern city growth has created "polycentric" urban regions, where one city does not necessarily dominate its surroundings but instead is central to an economic region. Instead of a single "metropolis" fulfilling an economic role, large urban areas such as the Tokyo–Osaka corridor or the southern California built up area have been considered as a modern "metropolis" even though the region encompasses multiple cities.

== Usage as a mainland area ==
In France, Portugal, Spain, and the Netherlands, the word metropolis (métropole (French) / metrópole (Portuguese) / metrópoli (Spanish) / metropool (Dutch)) designates the mainland part of a country situated on or close to the European mainland; in the case of France, this means France without its overseas departments. For Portugal and Spain during the Spanish Empire and Portuguese Empire period, the term was used to designate Portugal or Spain minus its colonies (the Ultramar). In France métropole can also be used to refer to a large urban agglomeration; for example, "La Métropole de Lyon" (the Lyon Metropolis).

== By country ==
The following countries either have a specific legal definition of "metropolis" or have a history of usage of the term (or a similar term).

=== Americas ===
==== Brazil ====
The term used in Brazilian Portuguese for a metropolitan area is Região Metropolitana. In Brazil, the Greater São Paulo is the principal metropolis with over 21 million inhabitants. In the larger cities, such as São Paulo and Rio de Janeiro (population 12 million), favelas (slums) grew up over decades as people migrated from rural areas in order to find work. Other metropolises in Brazil with more than one million inhabitants include: Belém, Belo Horizonte, Brasília, Campinas, Curitiba, Fortaleza, Goiânia, Maceió, Manaus, Porto Alegre, Recife, Salvador and São Luís.

==== Canada ====
Statistics Canada defines a census metropolitan area as one or more adjacent municipalities situated around a major urban core where the urban core has a population of at least 100,000. Canada's six largest metropolises are Toronto, Montreal, Vancouver, Ottawa, Calgary, and Edmonton.

==== Mexico ====
In Mexico, a metropolis is an urban area with a high concentration of population and activities, interacting with nearby municipalities. The Consejo Nacional de Población (CONAPO) last reviewed the criteria in 2018, and from that date, a metropolitan area in Mexico is defined as: a set of two or more municipalities where a city with a population of at least 100,000 is located, and whose urban area, functions and activities exceed the limits of the municipality, incorporating within its area of direct influence the predominantly urban neighboring municipalities, maintaining a high degree of socioeconomic integration. Also included are those municipalities that, due to their particular characteristics, are relevant to urban planning and policy for each metropolitan area. The six largest metropolitan areas are the Mexico City, Monterrey, Guadalajara, Puebla, Toluca and Tijuana.

==== United States ====
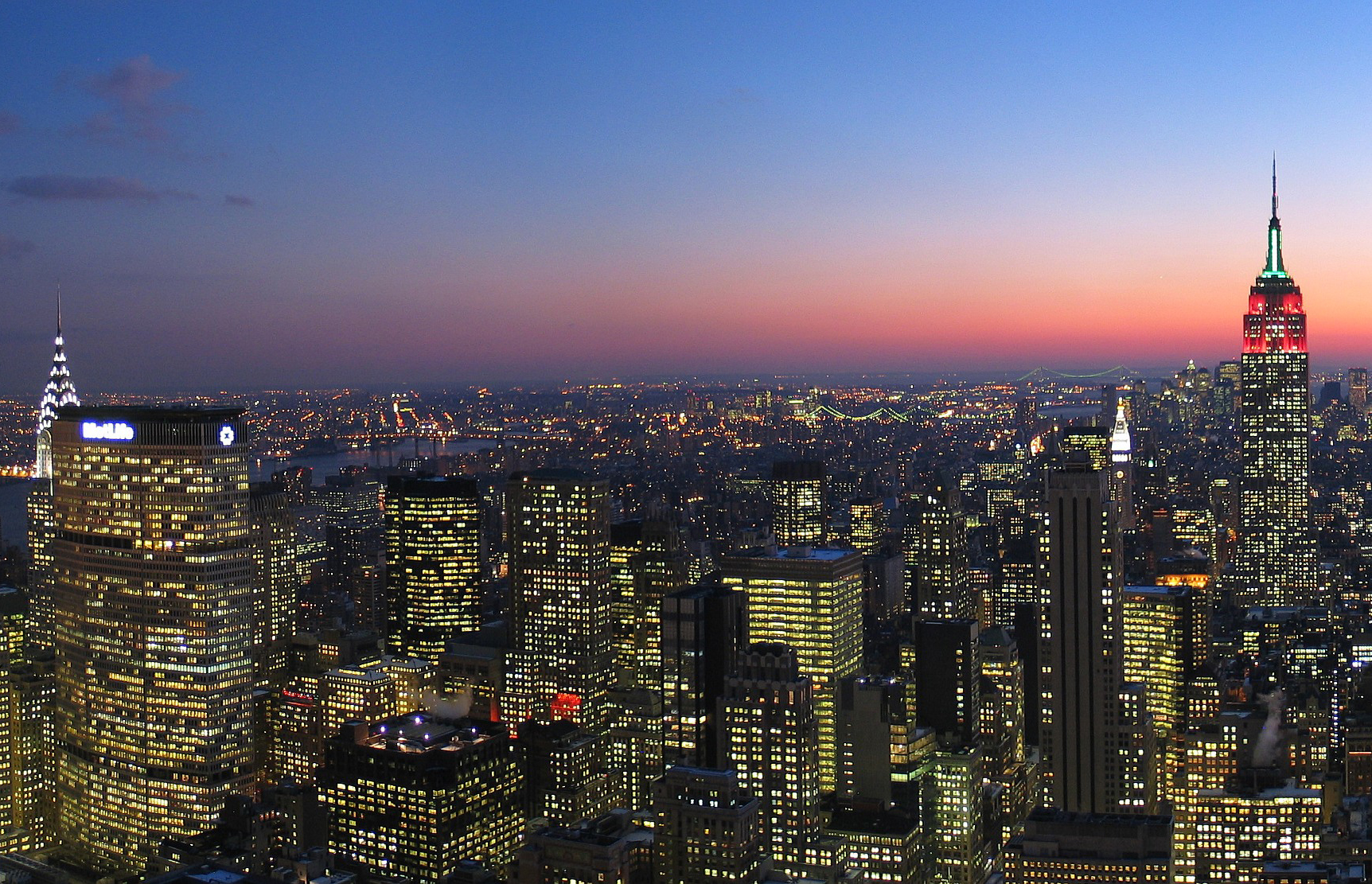
New York is the largest city in the U.S.

In the United States, an incorporated area or group of areas having a population more than 50,000 is required to have a metropolitan planning organization in order to facilitate major infrastructure projects and to ensure financial solvency. Thus, a population of 50,000 or greater has been used as a de facto standard to define a metropolis in the United States. A similar definition is used by the United States Census Bureau. The bureau defines a Metropolitan Statistical Area as "at least one urbanized area of 50,000 or more inhabitants." The six largest metropolitan areas in the United States are New York, Los Angeles, Chicago, Dallas, Houston, and Washington, D.C., with New York being the largest.

=== Asia ===
==== China ====
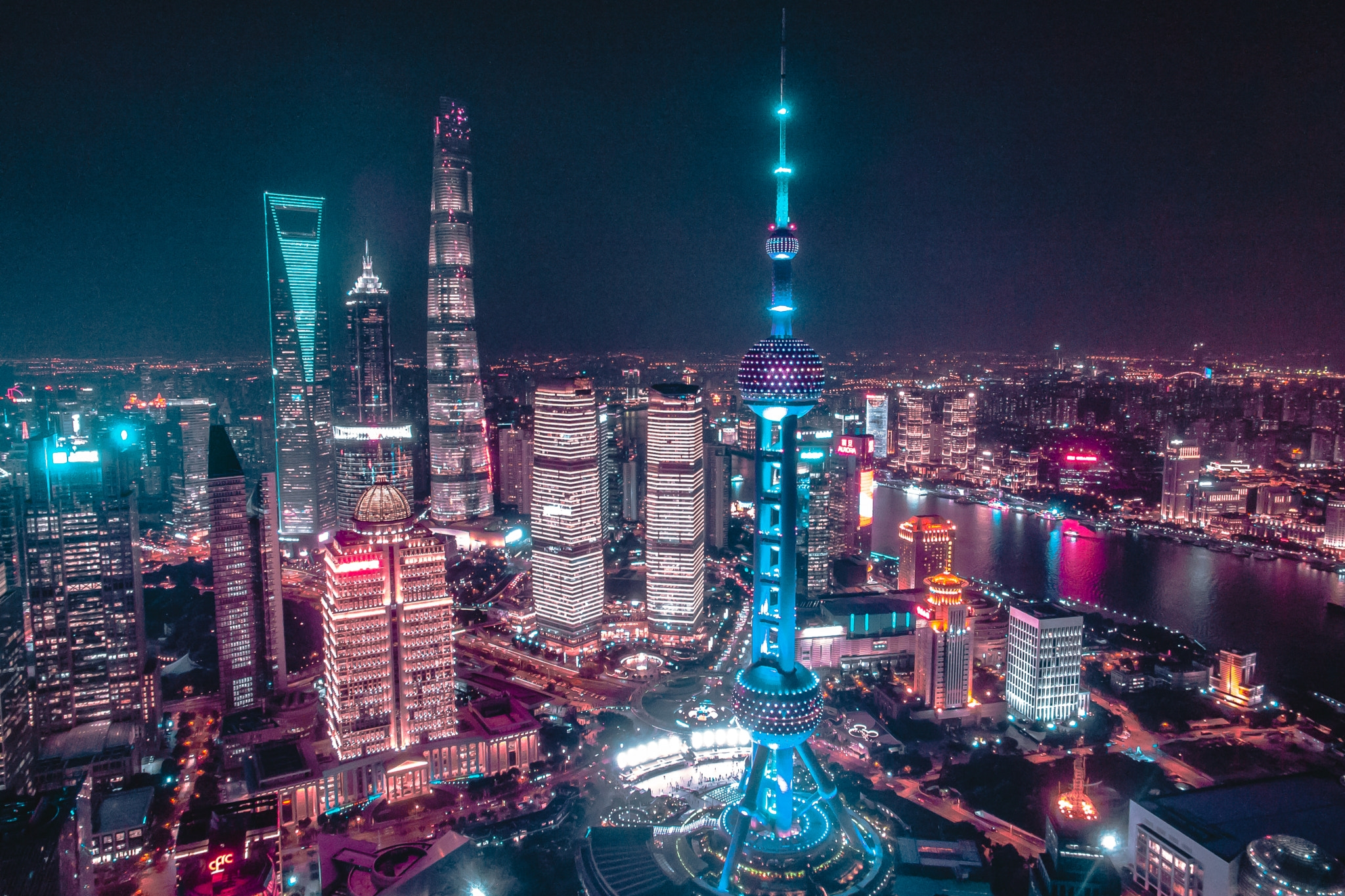
Shanghai, the most populous urban city in China

China has 60 megacities. The most populous megacities include Shenyang, Dalian, Changchun and Harbin in Northeast China; Beijing and Tianjin in North China; Xi'an in Northwest China; Chongqing and Chengdu in Southwest China; Wuhan in Central China, Shanghai, Nanjing, Suzhou, Hangzhou, Jinan, Qingdao in East China, and Guangzhou, Shenzhen, Sanya, Hong Kong, Macau in Southern China. Beijing, Tianjin, Shanghai, and Chongqing are municipalities directly under the central government.

==== India ====
The 74th Amendment to the Indian Constitution defines a metropolitan area as an area having a population of 10 Lakh (1 Million) or more, comprised in one or more districts and consisting of two or more Municipalities or Panchayats or other contiguous areas, specified by the Governor by public notification to be a Metropolitan area. As of 2011 Census of India, India has 46 other cities with populations greater than one million. Delhi, Mumbai, Kolkata, Chennai, Bangalore, Hyderabad, Pune, Ahmedabad, Kochi, are among the largest of 23 metropolitan cities in India.

==== Japan ====
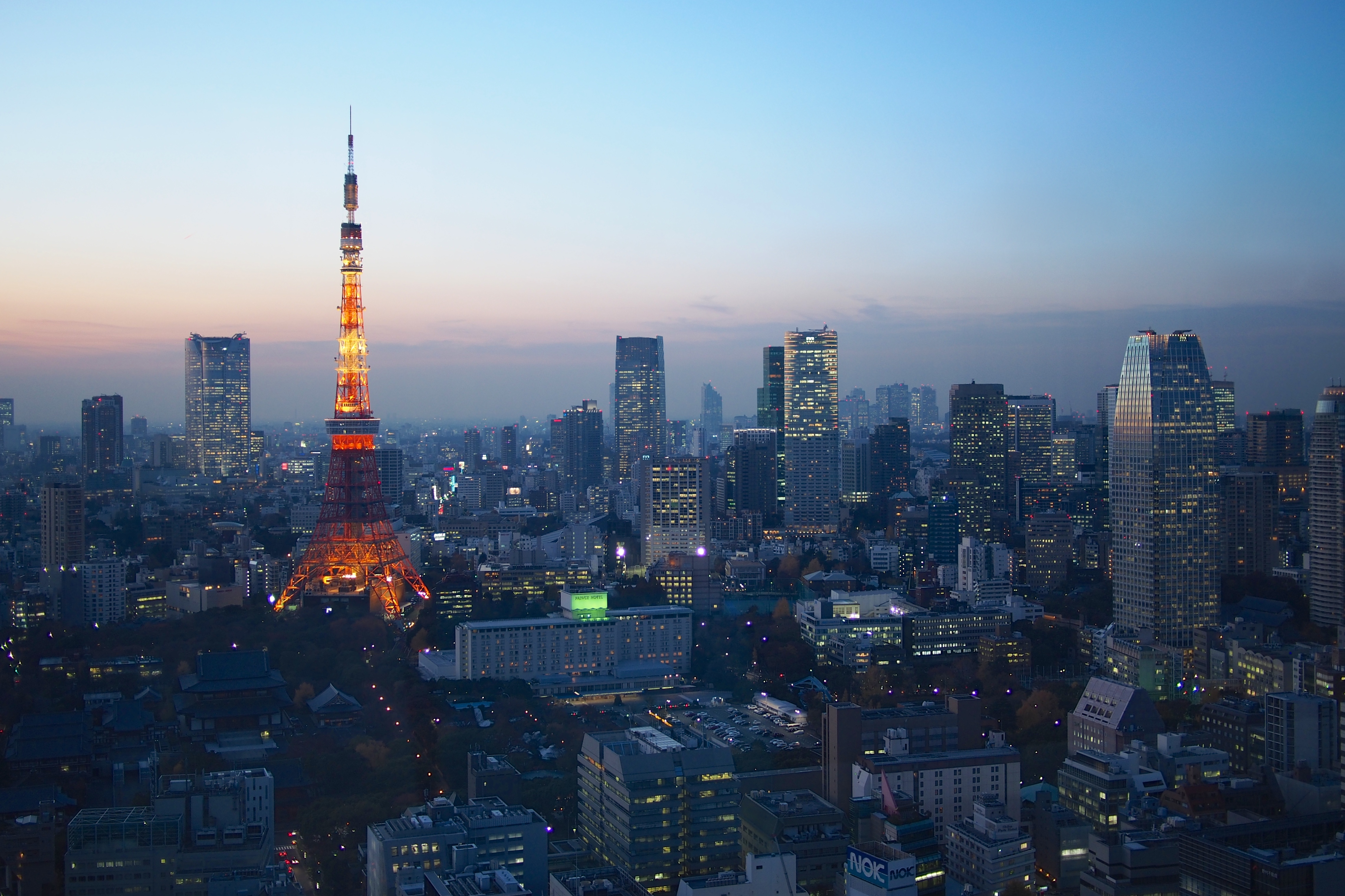
Tokyo, the capital and largest city of Japan

The Japanese legal term to (都) is by designation to be translated as "metropolis". However, existing translations predate the designation. Structured like a prefecture instead of a normal city, there is only one to in Japan, namely Tokyo. As of 2020, Japan has 12 other cities with populations greater than one million. The same Kanji character in Chinese, or in generic Japanese (traditional or non-specific), translates variously—city, municipality, special municipality—all qualify.

==== Philippines ====
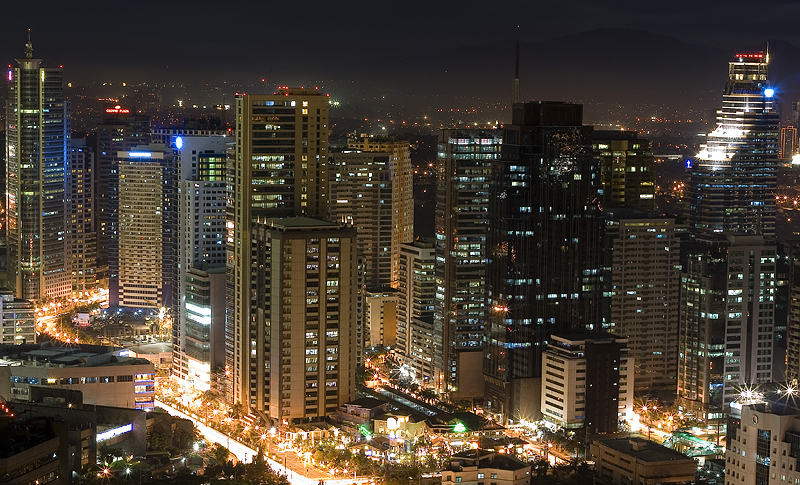
Metro Manila, the most populous metropolitan area in the Philippines

The Philippines has three metropolises as defined by the National Economic and Development Authority. They are Manila, Cebu, and Davao.

Greater Manila Area is the contiguous urbanization region or Extended Metropolitan Manila surrounding Metro Manila. This built-up zone includes Metro Manila and the neighboring provinces of Bulacan to the north, Cavite and Laguna to the south, and Rizal to the east. Though sprawl continues to absorb new zones, some urban zones are independent clusters of settlements surrounded by non-urban areas.

==== South Korea ====
In the South Korea, there are seven special and metropolitan cities at autonomous administrative levels. These are the most populous metropolitan areas in the country. In decreasing order of the population of 2015 census, they are Seoul, Busan, Incheon, Daegu, Daejeon, Gwangju and Ulsan.

According to the census of 2015, cities of Changwon and Suwon also qualify for being elevated to the level of metropolitan cities (having population over 1 million), but any future plans to promote them into metropolitan city are unlikely to be accepted because of political concerns about the structure of administrative divisions. There are also some county-level cities with increasing population near 1 million, namely Goyang, Yongin, and Seongnam, but they are also unlikely to be promoted into metropolitan city because they are all satellite cities of Seoul.

=== Europe ===
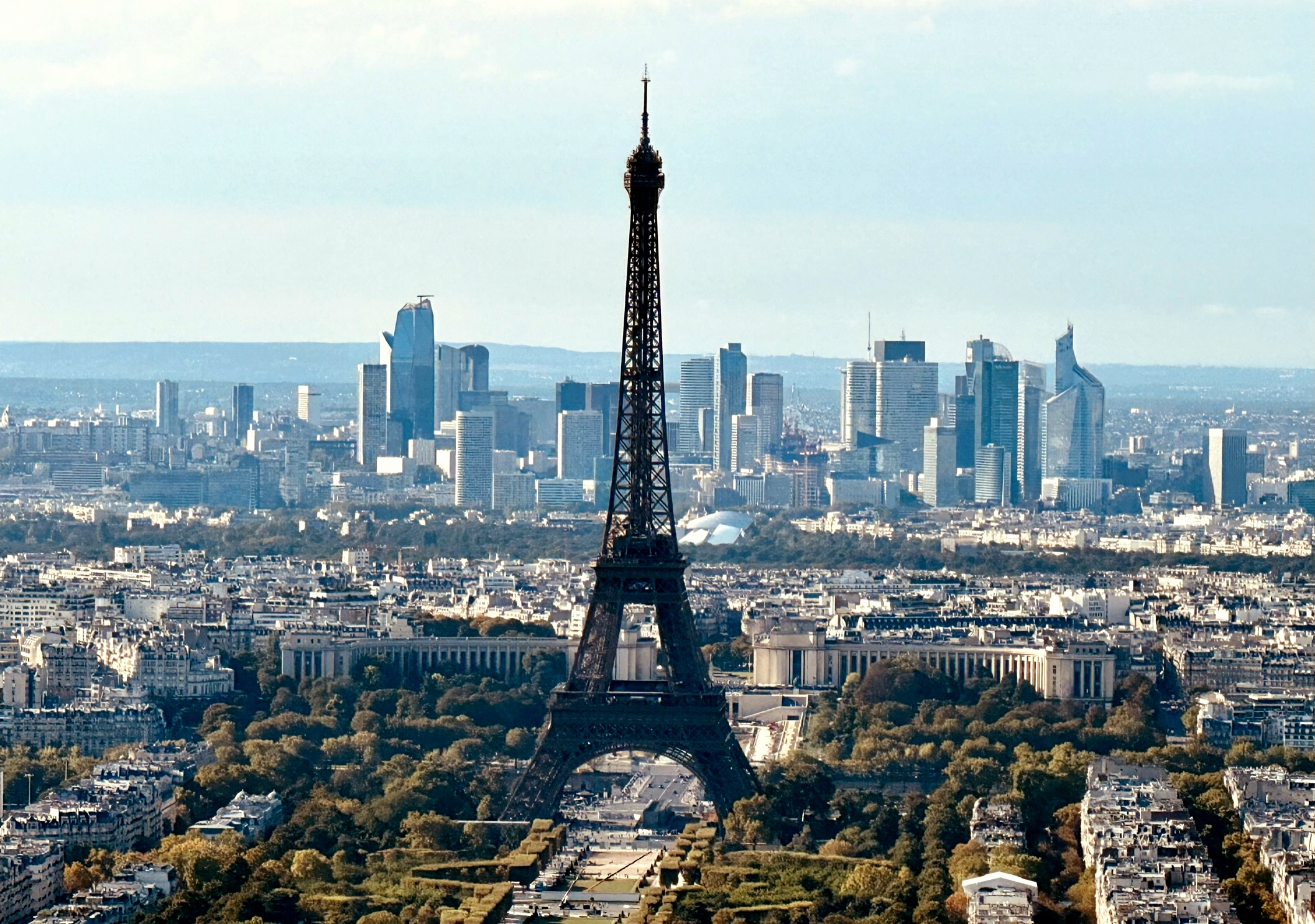
Skyline of Paris, which is the most populated urban area in the European Union and France

==== France ====
A 2014 law allowed any group of communes to cooperate in a larger administrative division called a métropole. One métropole, Lyon, also has status as a department.

France's national statistics institute, Insee, designates 12 of the country's urban areas as metropolitan areas. Paris, Lyon and Marseille are the biggest, the other nine being Toulouse, Lille, Bordeaux, Nice, Nantes, Strasbourg, Rennes, Grenoble and Montpellier.

==== Germany ====
The largest German city by administrative borders is Berlin, while Rhine-Ruhr is the largest metropolitan area (with more than 10 million people). The importance of a city is measured with three groups of indicators, also called metropolitan functions: The decision making and control function, the innovation and competition function, and the gateway function. These functions are seen as key domains for metropolitan regions in developing their performance.

In spatial planning, a metropolis is usually observed within its regional context, thus the focus is mainly set on the metropolitan regions. These regions can be mono central or multi central. Eleven metropolitan regions have been defined due to these indicators: Berlin-Brandenburg, Bremen-Oldenburg, Dresden-Halle-Leipzig, Frankfurt-Rhine-Main, Hamburg, Hannover-Braunschweig-Göttingen-Wolfsburg, Munich, Nuremberg, Rhine-Neckar, Rhine-Ruhr (with Cologne/Bonn), and Stuttgart.

==== Italy ====
As of January 1, 2015, there are 14 "metropolitan cities" in Italy. Rome, Milan, Naples and other big cores have taken in urban zones from their surrounding areas and merged them into the new entities, which have been home for one out of three Italians. The provinces remained in the parts of the country not belonging to any Metropolitan City.

==== Poland ====
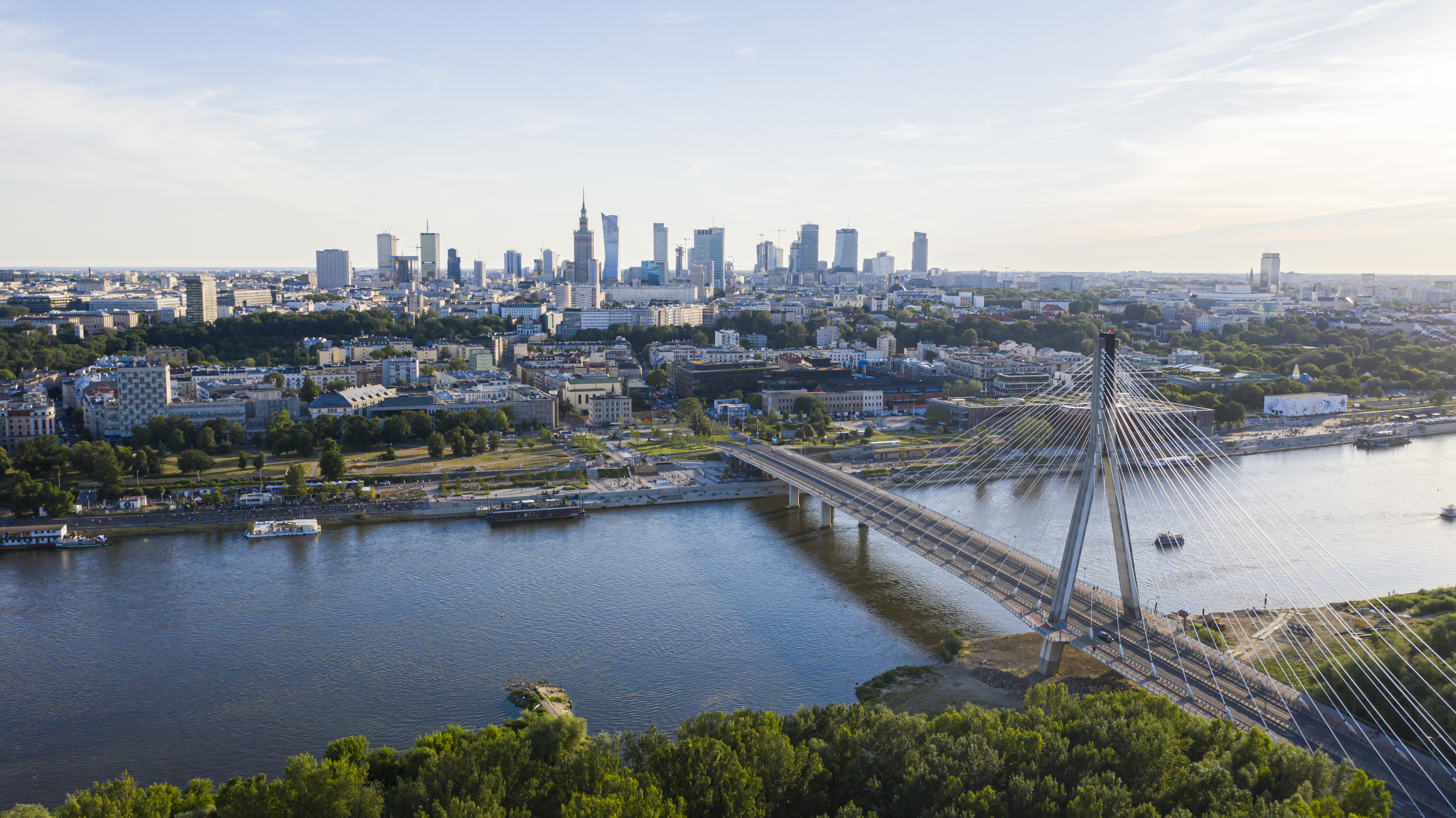
Warsaw, the capital and largest city of Poland

The Union of Polish metropolises (Polish: Unia Metropolii Polskich), established in 1990, is an organization of the largest cities in the country. Currently twelve cities are members of the organization, of which 11 have more than a quarter-million inhabitants. The largest metropolitan area in Poland, if ranked solely by the number of inhabitants, is the Katowice metropolitan area with around 3 million inhabitants (5 million inhabitants in the Katowice–Ostrava metropolitan area). The Metropolis GZM is an initiative of recent years attempting to unite the conurbation into one official urban unit. It is followed by Warsaw, with around 1.7 million inhabitants in the city proper and 3.1 million in the Warsaw metropolitan area. Other Polish metropolises are Kraków, Łódź, Wrocław, Poznań, Tricity, Szczecin and Bydgoszcz–Toruń.

==== Turkey ====
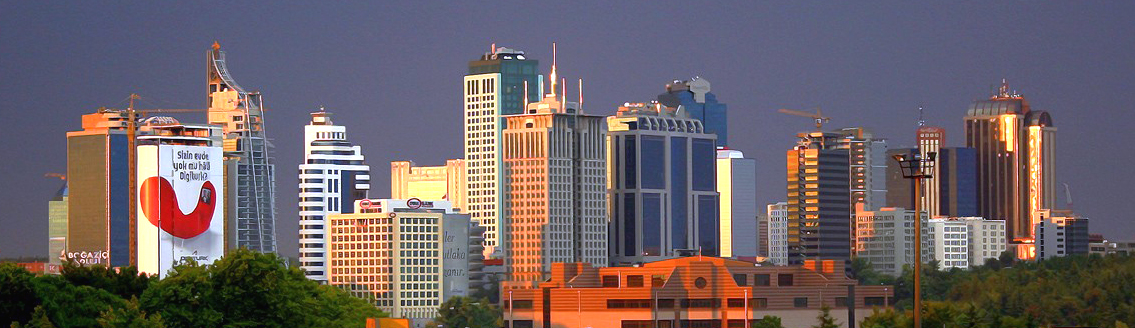
Istanbul is the largest city in Turkey.

In Turkey, the metropolitan cities are described as "büyükşehir". There are 30 metropolitan municipalities in Turkey now and metropolitan municipality borders would overlap with provincial borders. The largest by far is Istanbul, followed by Ankara, İzmir and Bursa. Istanbul, the largest city in Europe in terms of population, has a population of over 15 million. The city has surpassed London and Dubai to become the most visited city in the world, with more than 20 million foreign visitors in 2023. This city, which played an important role in the spread of Christianity, is an important heritage for European culture.

==== United Kingdom ====
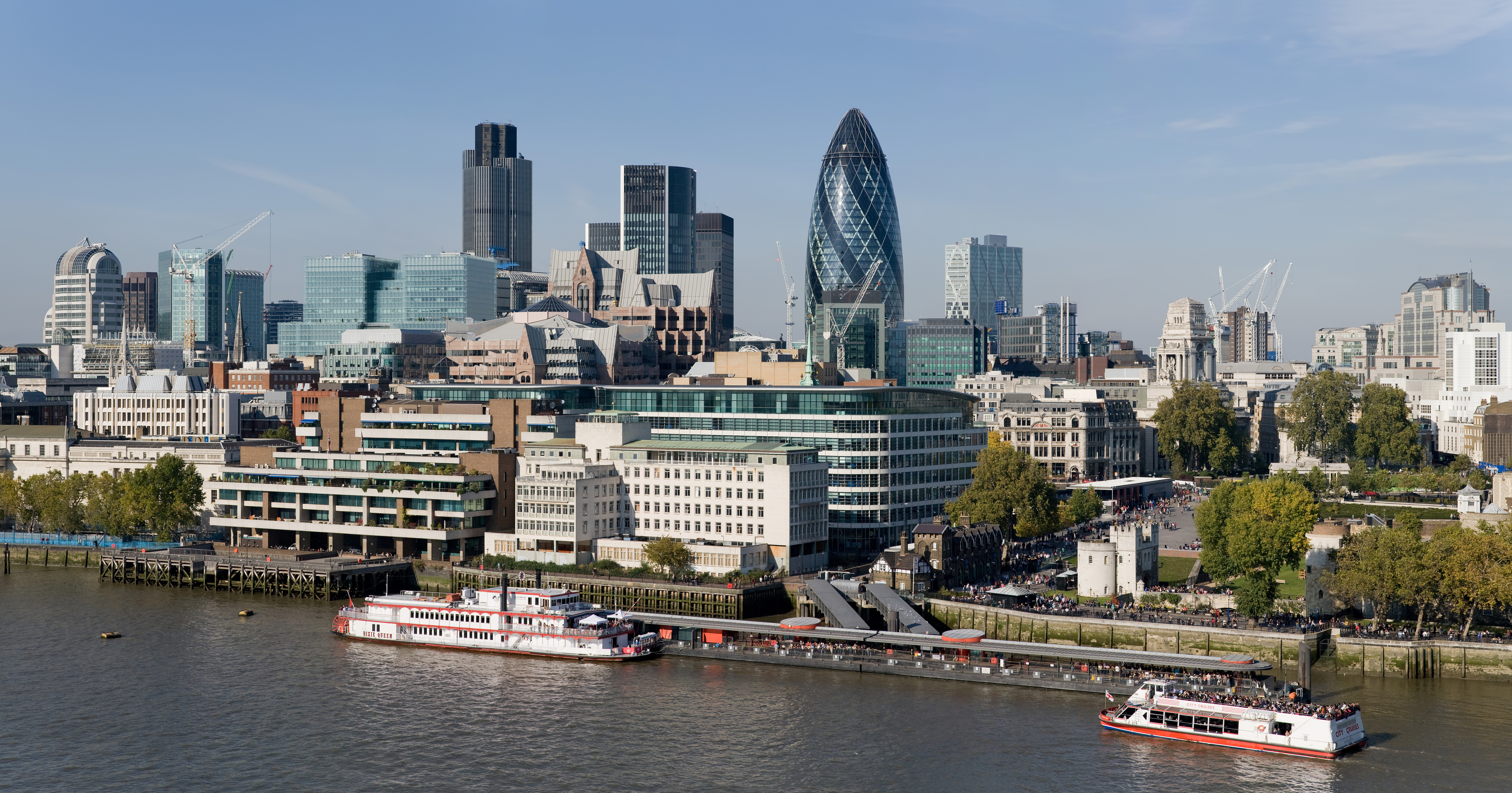
London is the largest city in the United Kingdom.

In the United Kingdom, the term the Metropolis was historically used to exclusively refer to the cities of London and Westminster, at the heart of what later became the Greater London Built-up Area. The term is retained by the Greater London police force, the Metropolitan Police (the "Met"), formed in 1829. The chief officer of the Metropolitan Police is formally known as the Commissioner of Police of the Metropolis.

The Metropolis Management Act 1855 created the Metropolitan Board of Works, covering an area now known as Inner London, and in 1889 this became the elected London County Council.

Since 1974, six conurbations in England (outside London) have been known as metropolitan counties, each divided into metropolitan districts. These counties are South Yorkshire (centred on the city of Sheffield), the West Midlands (including Birmingham), West Yorkshire (including Leeds), Merseyside (including Liverpool), Greater Manchester and Tyne & Wear (including Newcastle-upon-Tyne). Greater Glasgow, South Hampshire, Nottingham Urban Area, Greater Bristol, Belfast metropolitan area, and Leicester urban area are also large conurbations with more than half a million citizens.

==== Sweden ====
In Sweden, the term metropolis has been used to exclusively refer to Stockholm or Greater Stockholm.

=== Oceania ===
==== Australia ====
The Australian Bureau of Statistics defines a metropolitan area as any statistical division or district with a population of more than 100,000. According to this definition, there are currently 19 metropolitan areas in Australia, including every state capital. By population, the largest metropolitan area is Sydney (urban area population at 2020 Census of 5,367,206) and the smallest is Bendigo (urban area population at 2020 Census of 100,632). Rapid urban growth in Victoria has seen the 'Manhattanization' of Melbourne, with high-rise clusters in South Yarra, Box Hill, Moonee Ponds and Footscray. The regional city of Geelong which is approximately 40 miles south west of Melbourne, has seen the emergence of high-rise office and apartment buildings in recent years. Geelong is the fastest growing regional city in Australia, and its growth will transform the Port Phillip region in a similar manner to San Francisco's Bay Area. (urban area population at 2020 Census of 160,991).

== See also ==
- Megalopolis
- Metropole
- Metropolitan area

=== Other city types ===
- Global city
- Megacity

=== Lists ===
- List of largest cities

=== Planning theories ===
- New Urbanism
- Smart growth
- Transit-oriented development

=== Others ===
- C40 Cities Climate Leadership Group
- Ekistics
- Settlement hierarchy
- Sustainable city
