= Bydgoszcz metropolitan area =

Bydgoszcz metropolitan area bydgoski obszar metropolitalny (Polish)
- metropolitan area
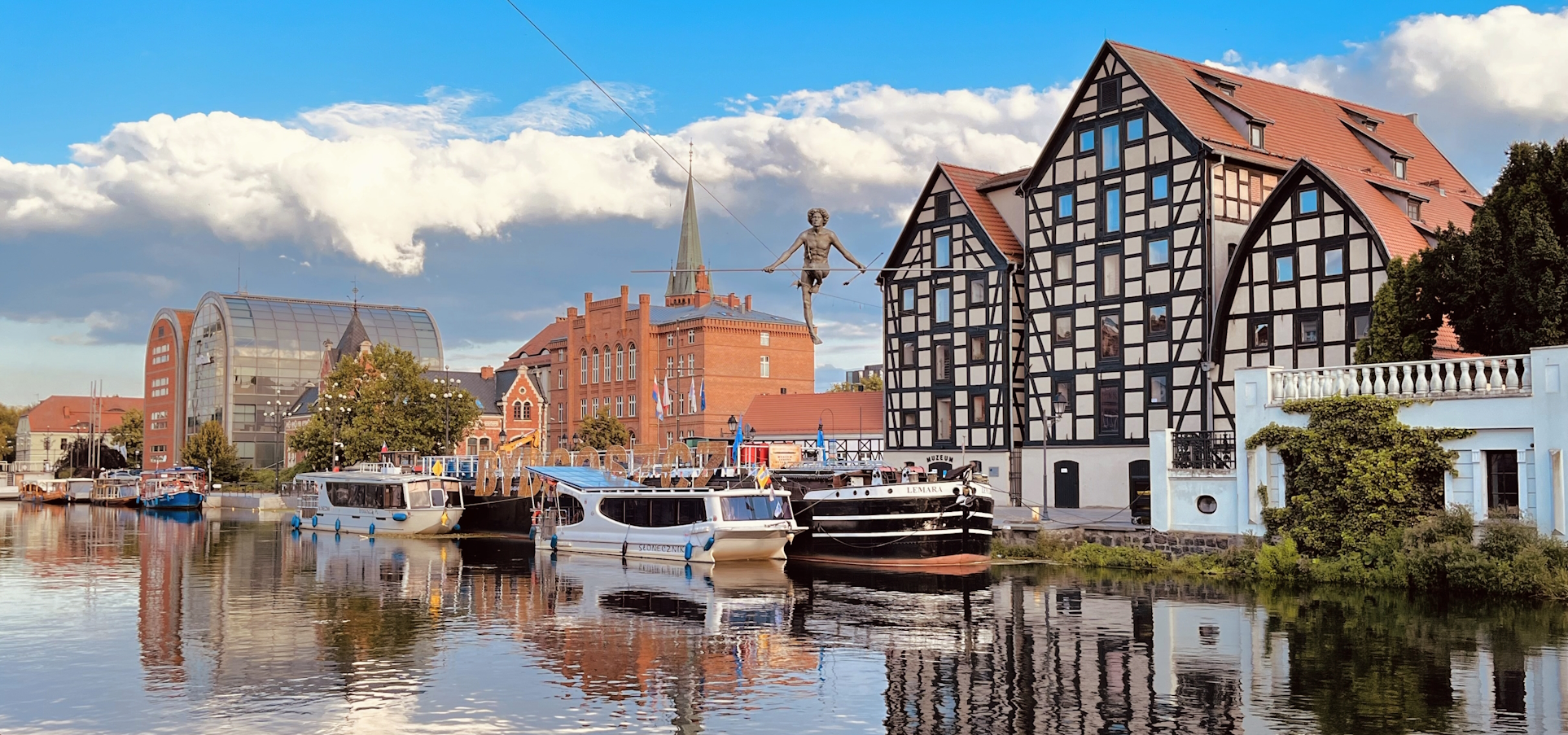
- Waterfront of the Bydgoszcz Old Town

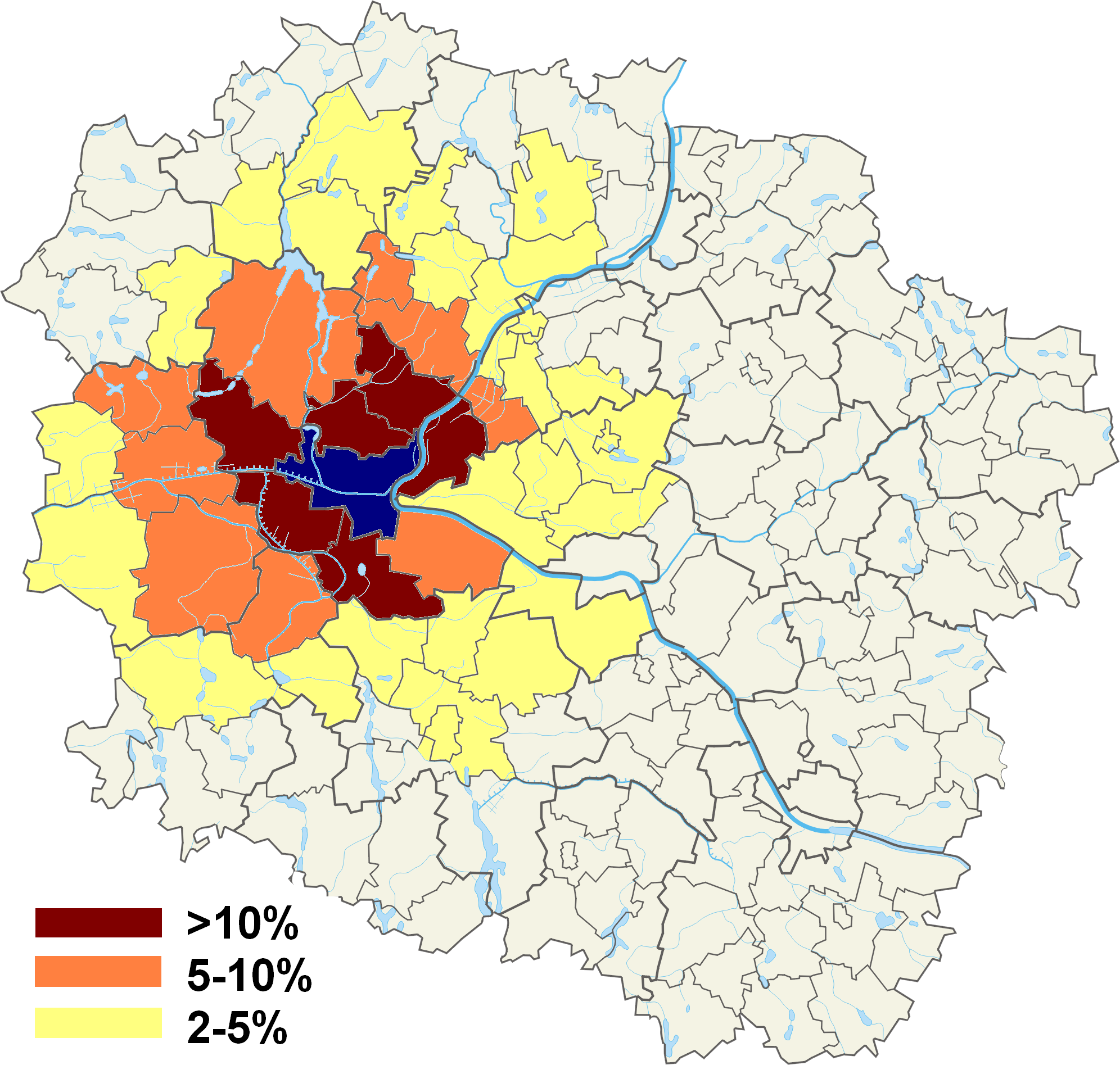
- Map of the work commutes to the city of Bydgoszcz
- Country: Poland
- Largest city: Bydgoszcz

Area
  - Metro: 3,336 km^{2} (1,288 sq mi)

Population
  - Metro: 603,777
- Time zone: UTC+1 (CET)

The Bydgoszcz metropolitan area is the metropolitan area of Bydgoszcz. The metropolitan area covers counties in the Kuyavian-Pomeranian Voivodeship.

== Metropolia Bydgoszcz association ==
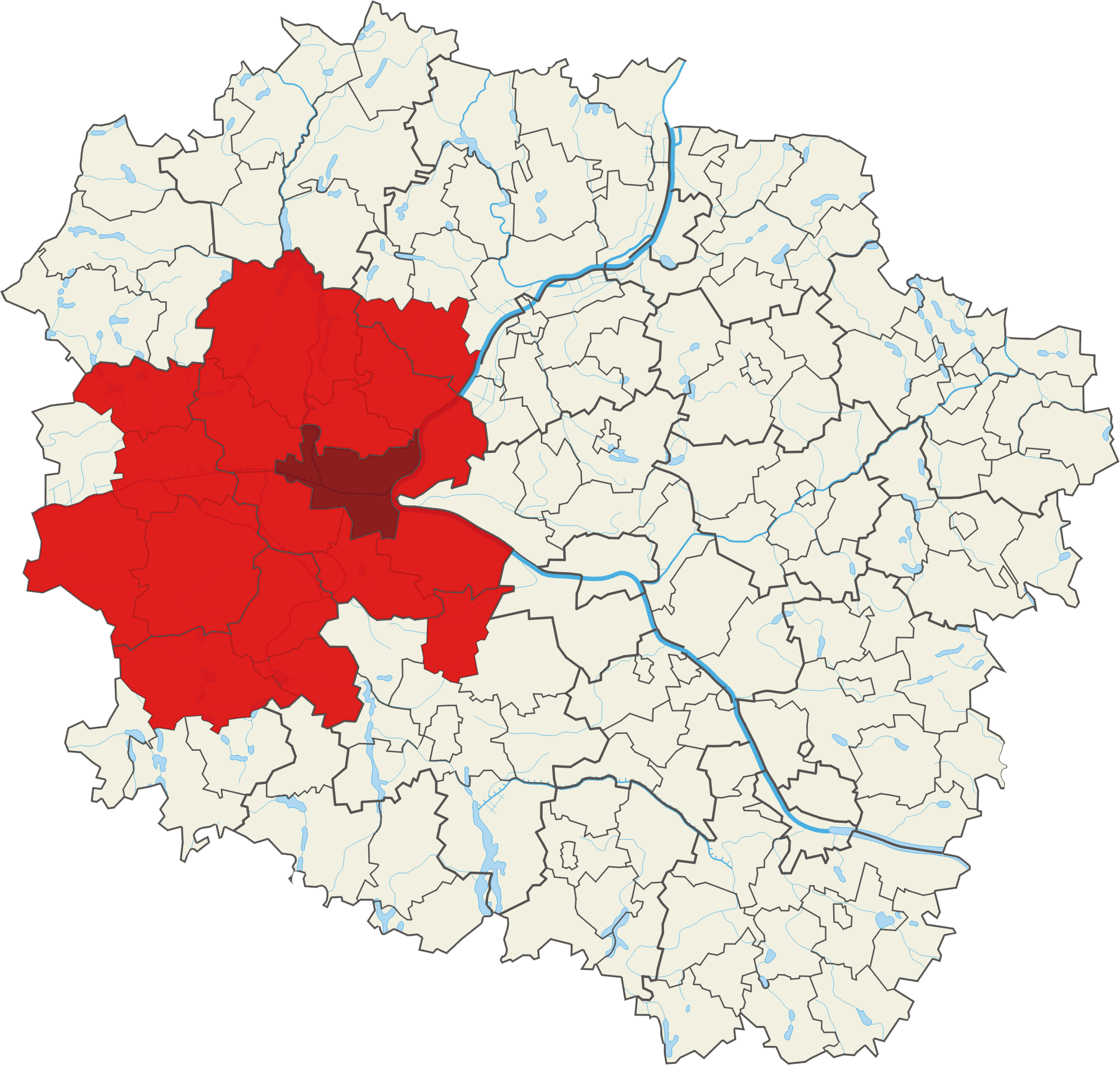
The area of Metropolia Bydgoszcz association

Metropolia Bydgoszcz is an association created with a purpose of strengthening the relations between the local governments in the area. It has been delimited as an area economically and geographically linked to Bydgoszcz, and includes the city of Bydgoszcz and satellite towns of Nakło nad Notecią, Solec Kujawski, Żnin, Koronowo, Szubin, Barcin, Kcynia, Łabiszyn, Mrocza and Pruszcz. It covers an area of 3,336 km^{2} and its population totals 603,777 people.

== See also ==
- Bydgoszcz–Toruń metropolitan area
- Metropolitan areas in Poland
