= Metropolitan areas in Poland =

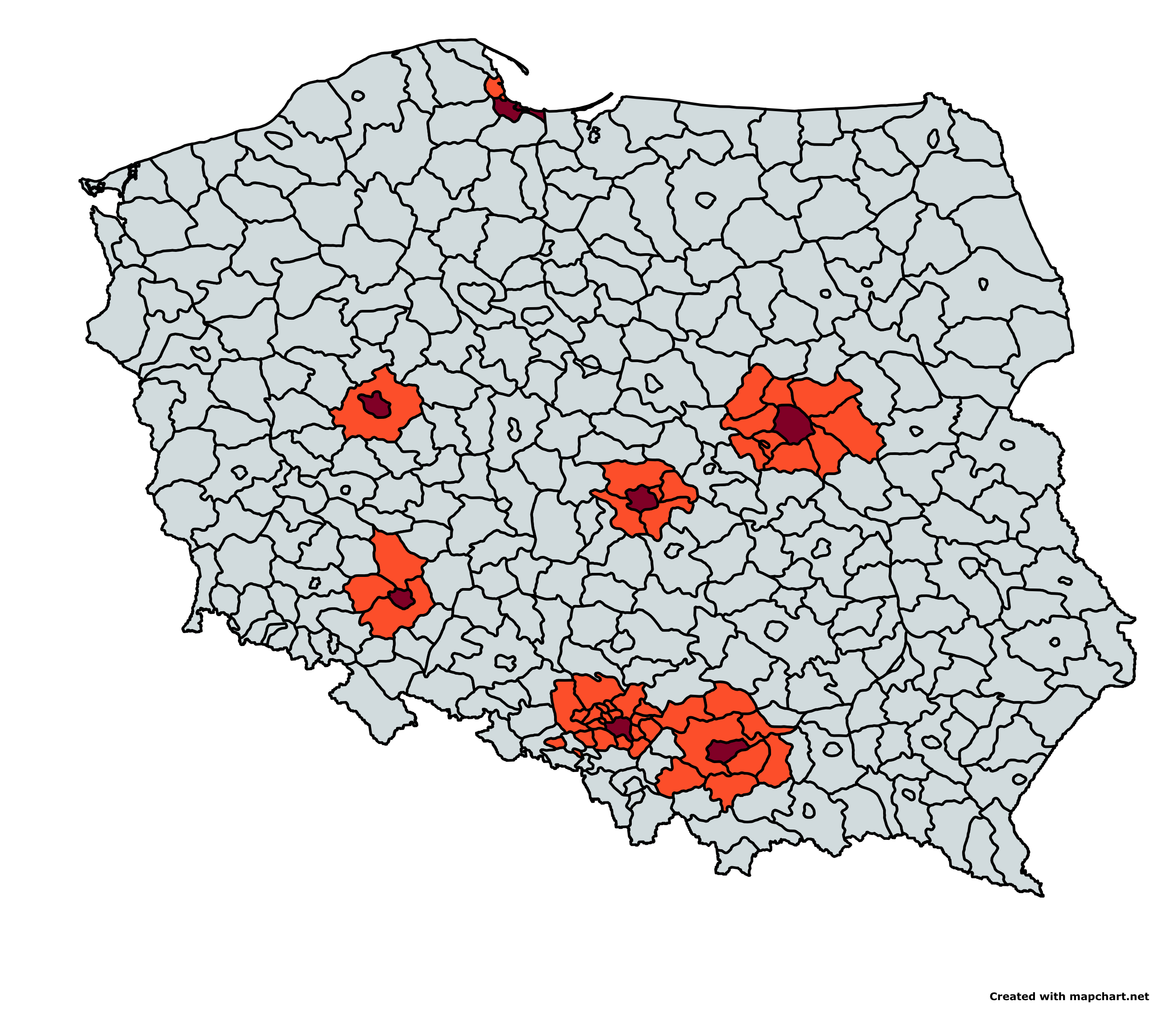
Metropolitan areas in Poland by population over 850,000

This is a list of metropolitan areas in Poland.

== List ==
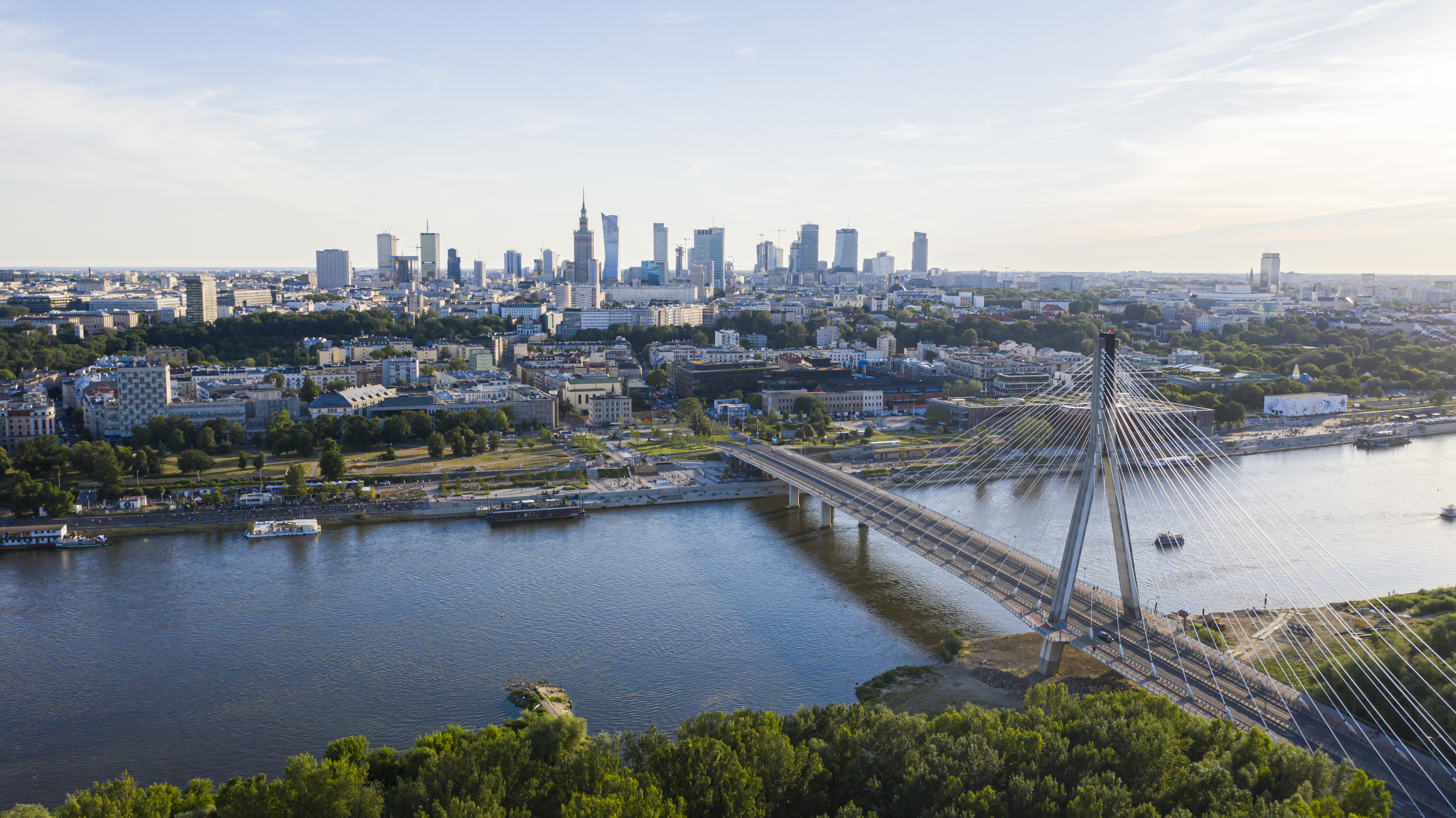
Warsaw is the largest metropolitan area in Poland (3.2 million)

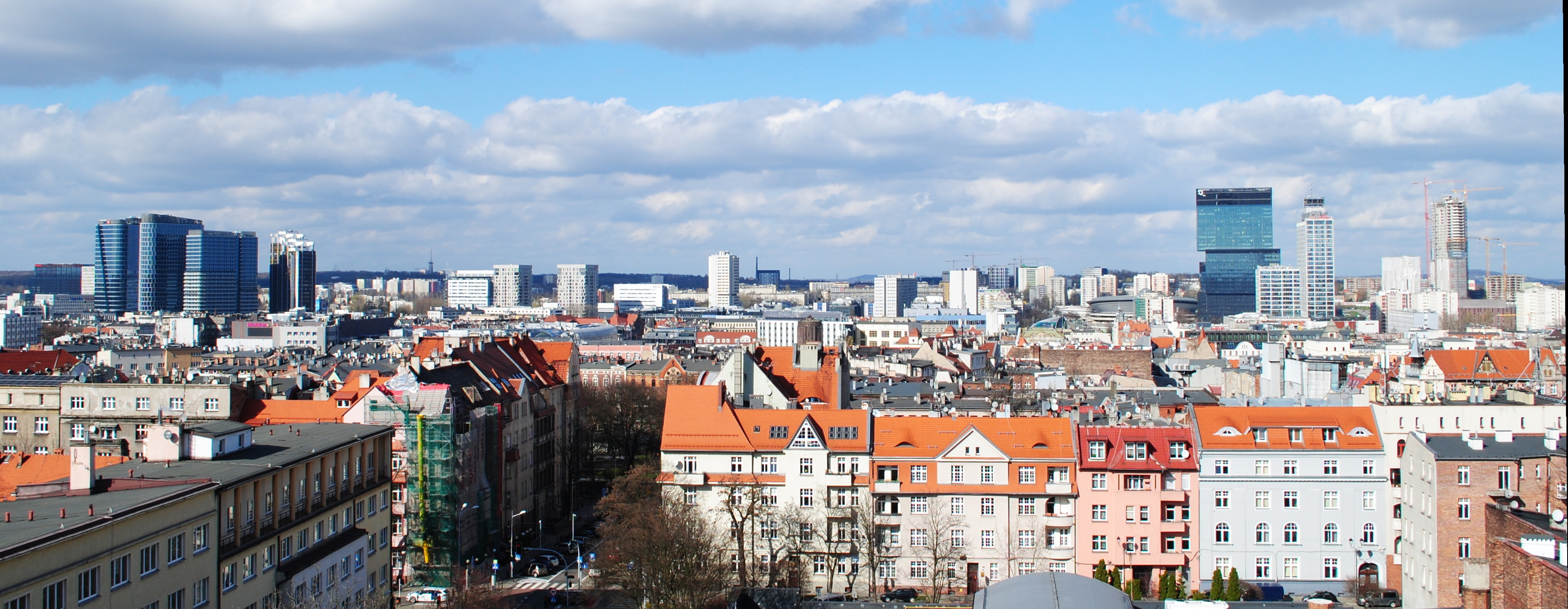
Katowice is the second largest metropolitan area in Poland (2.5 million)

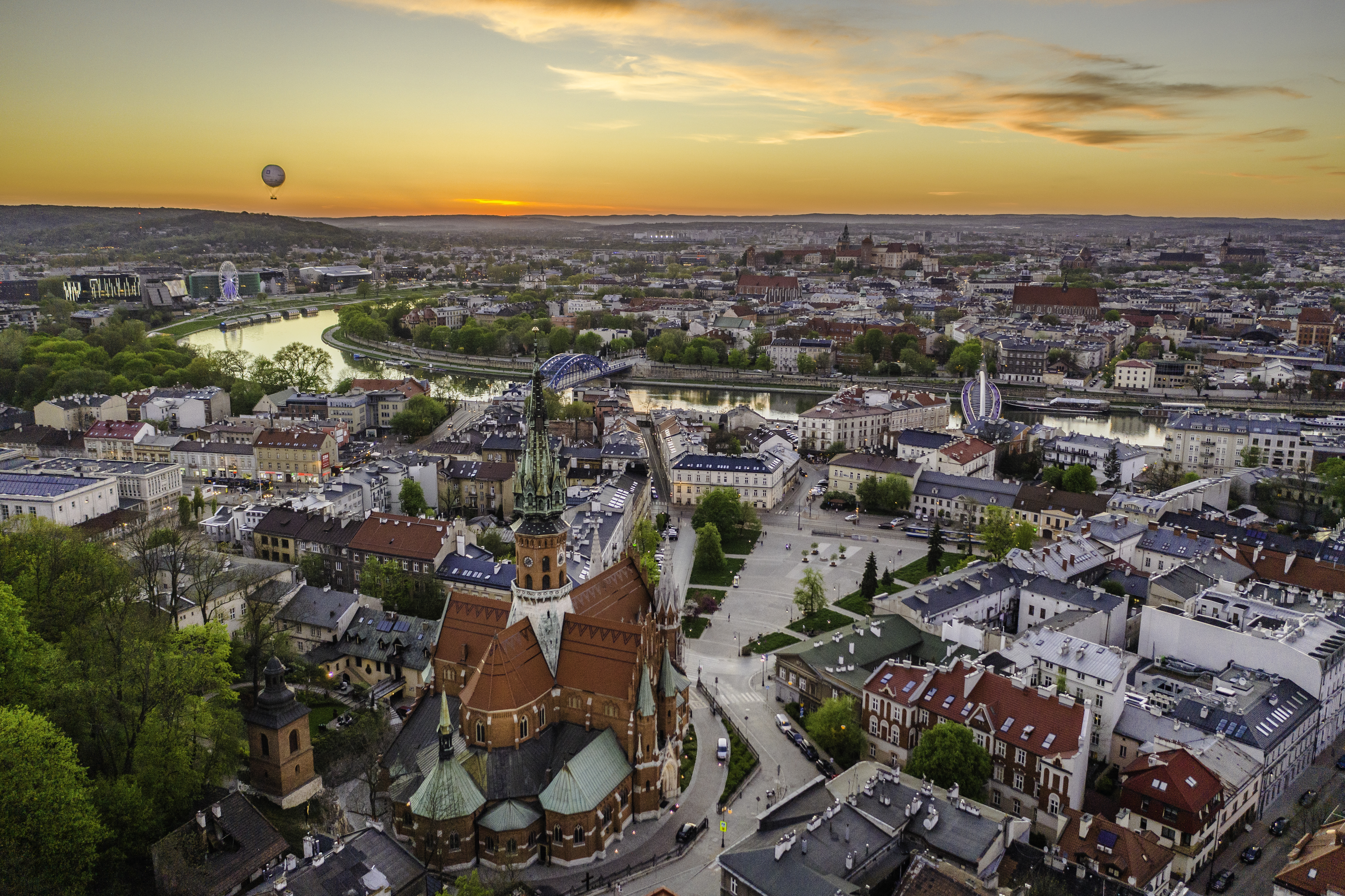
Kraków is the third largest metropolitan area in Poland (1.4 million)

| Metropolitan Area | Population (2021) |
|---|---|
| Warsaw metropolitan area | 3,220,251 |
| Katowice metropolitan area (Note: Katowice metropolitan area, Rybnik metropolitan area, and Bielsko-Biała metropolitan area can also be considered parts of one polycentric Katowice-Ostrava metropolitan area.) | 2,469,891 |
| Kraków metropolitan area | 1,428,363 |
| Tricity metropolitan area | 1,174,274 |
| Poznań metropolitan area | 996,280 |
| Łódź metropolitan area | 895,084 |
| Wrocław metropolitan area | 886,063 |
| Bydgoszcz-Toruń metropolitan area (Note: Bydgoszcz metropolitan area and Toruń metropolitan area can also be considered one polycentric Bydgoszcz–Toruń metropolitan area.) | 815,590 |
| Lublin metropolitan area | 669,187 |
| Rzeszów metropolitan area | 509,300 |
| Bydgoszcz metropolitan area | 496,718 |
| Szczecin metropolitan area | 478,741 |
| Białystok metropolitan area | 422,851 |
| Częstochowa metropolitan area | 388,532 |
| Kielce metropolitan area | 379,570 |
| Bielsko-Biała metropolitan area | 358,271 |
| Toruń metropolitan area | 318,872 |
| Tarnów metropolitan area | 292,861 |
| Radom metropolitan area | 276,689 |
| Nowy Sącz metropolitan area | 259,819 |
| Olsztyn metropolitan area | 249,893 |
| Opole metropolitan area | 237,447 |
| Wałbrzych metropolitan area | 211,829 |

== See also ==
- Largest cities of Poland
- List of metropolitan areas in Europe
  - List of metropolitan areas in Germany
  - Largest metropolitan areas in the Nordic countries
