= Poznań metropolitan area =

Poznań metropolitan area Metropolia Poznań
- Urban area
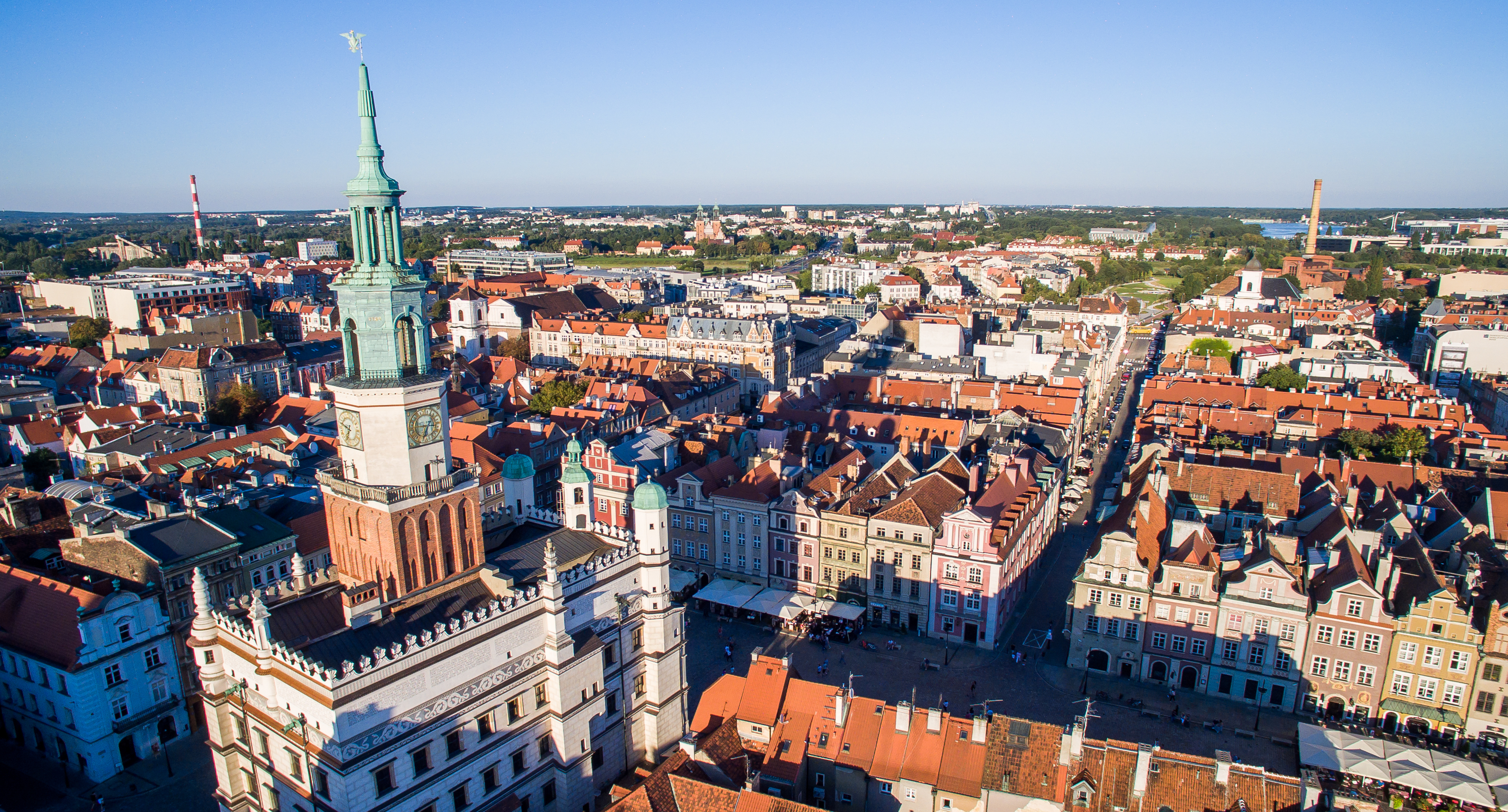
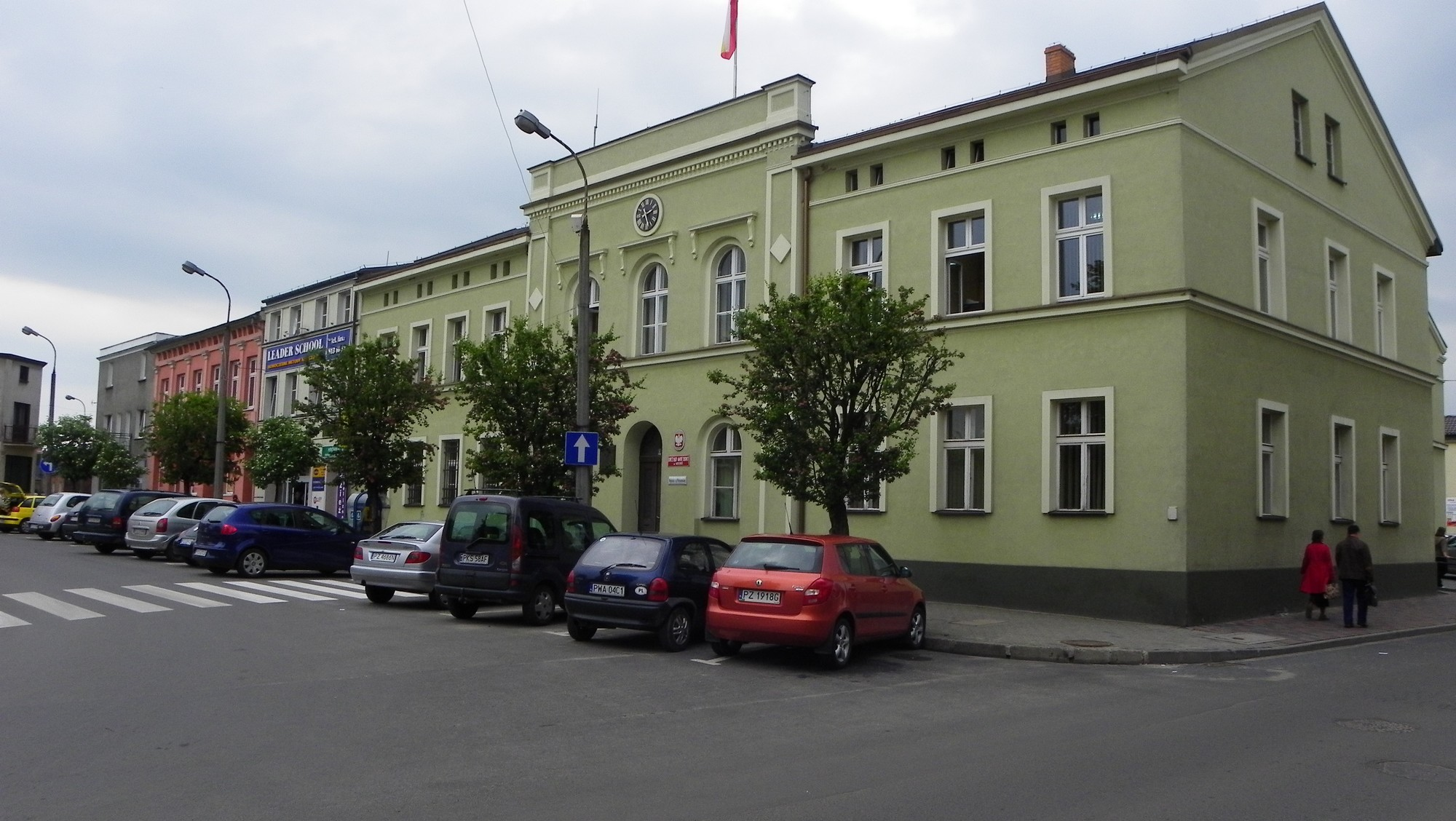
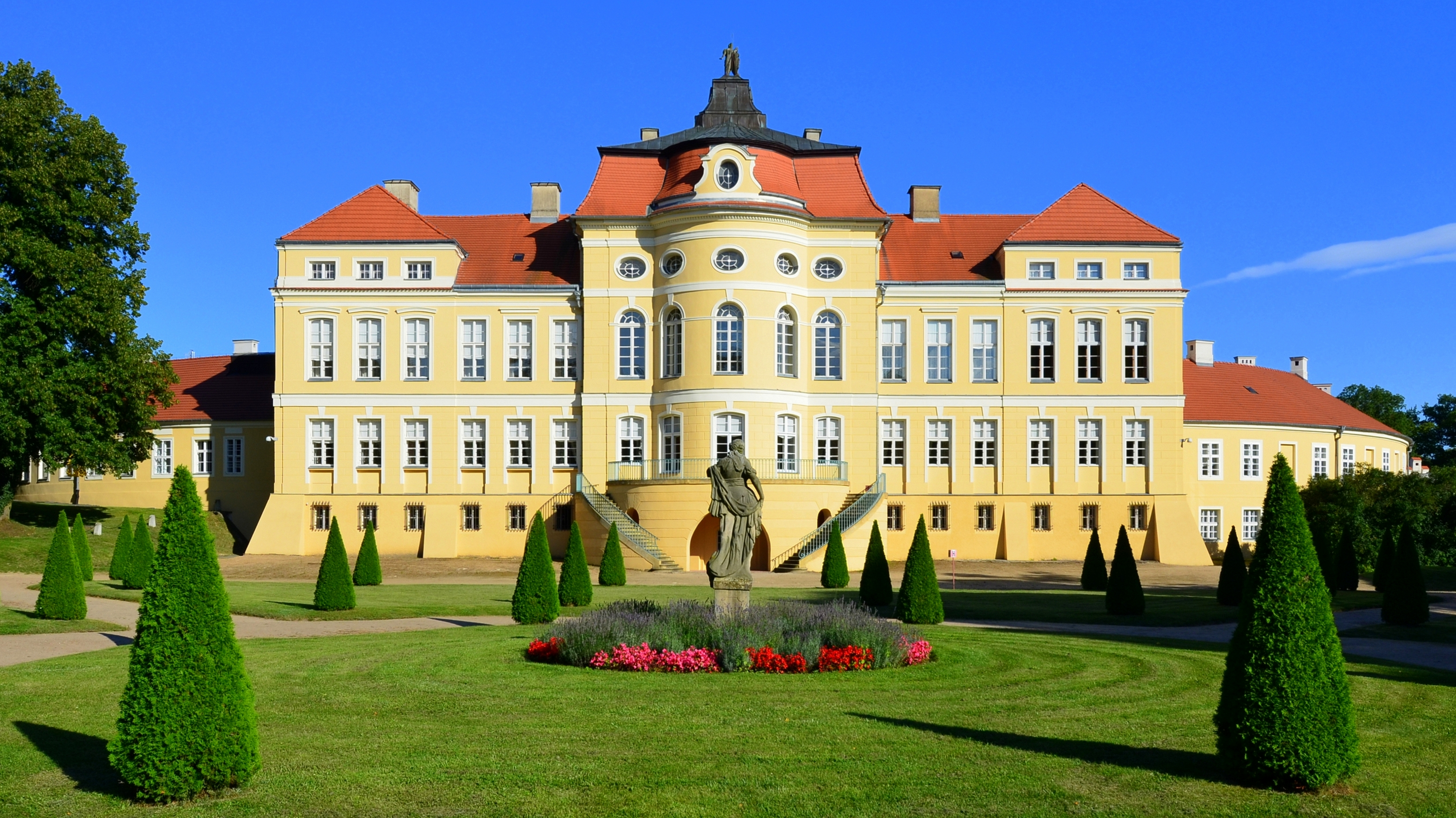
- From top, left to right: Skyline of Poznań; Town Hall in Mosina; Raczyński Palace in Rogalin

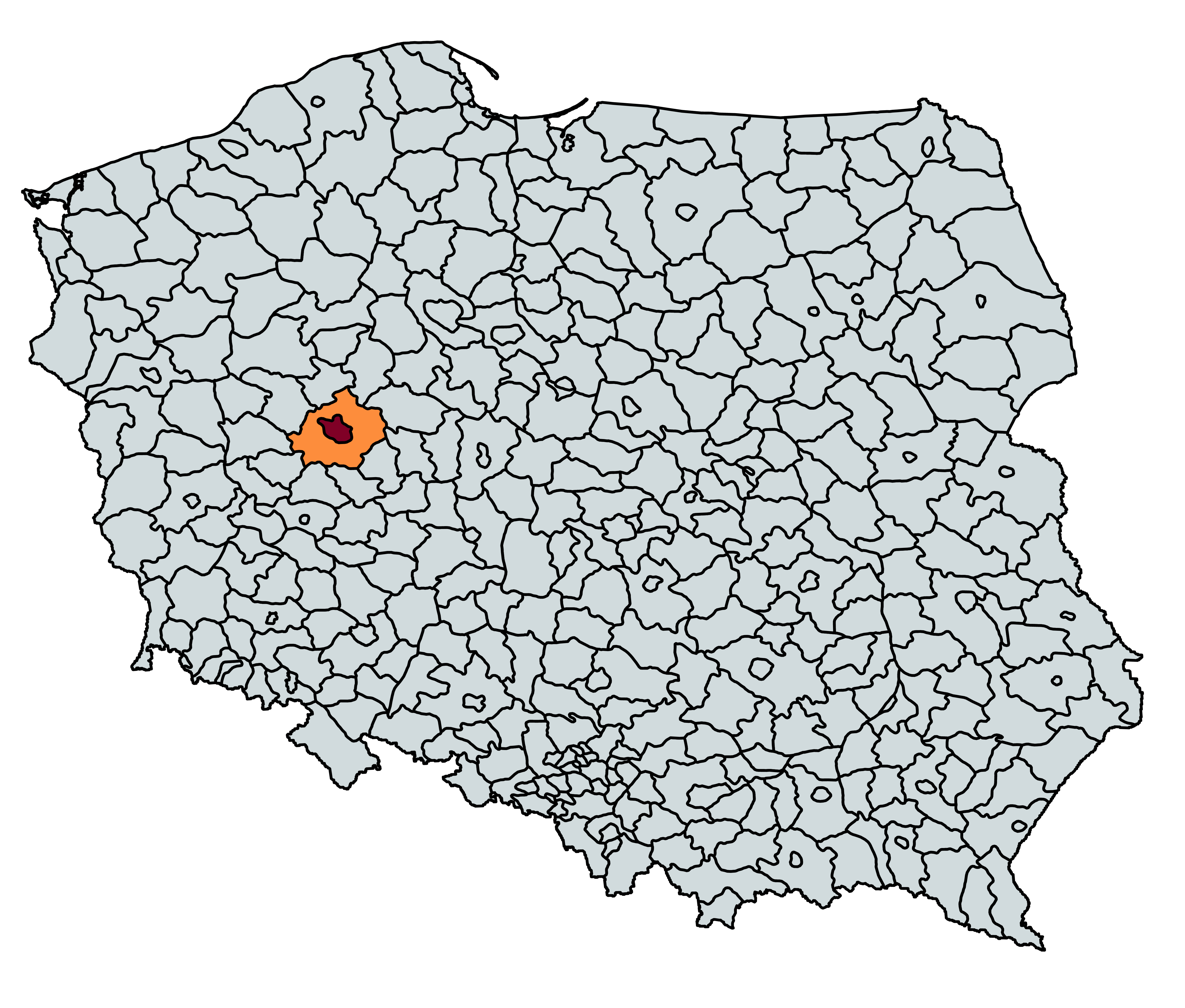
- Poznań city (dark red) and Poznań County (orange)
- Country: Poland
- Largest city: Poznań

Area
  - Metro: 2,162 km^{2} (835 sq mi)

Population
  - Metro: 1,029,021
  - Metro density: 476/km^{2} (1,230/sq mi)

GDP
  - Metro: €28.603 billion (2021)
- Time zone: UTC+1 (CET)
  - Summer (DST): UTC+2 (CEST)
- Primary airport: Poznań–Ławica Airport
- Website: metropoliapoznan.pl

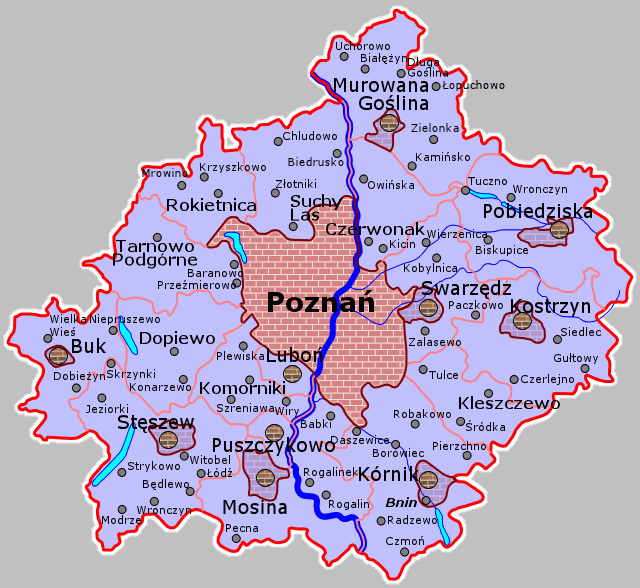
Detailed map of Poznań metropolitan area

The Poznań metropolitan area (Polish: Metropolia Poznań) is the metropolitan area of Poznań in west-central Poland. The metropolitan area covers ten counties in the Greater Poland Voivodeship, with an area of 2,162 km^{2}

The largest cities or towns within the metropolitan area are Poznań, Swarzędz, Luboń and Mosina.

== Economy ==
In 2020 Poznań's gross metropolitan product was €26 billion. This puts Poznań in 94th place among cities in European Union.

== Transport ==
=== Rail ===
The Poznań Metropolitan Railway, a commuter rail line operated by Greater Poland Railways serves the area.

== See also ==
- Metropolitan areas in Poland
