= Łódź metropolitan area =

Łódź metropolitan area Łódźki Obszar Metropolitalny
- Metropolitan area
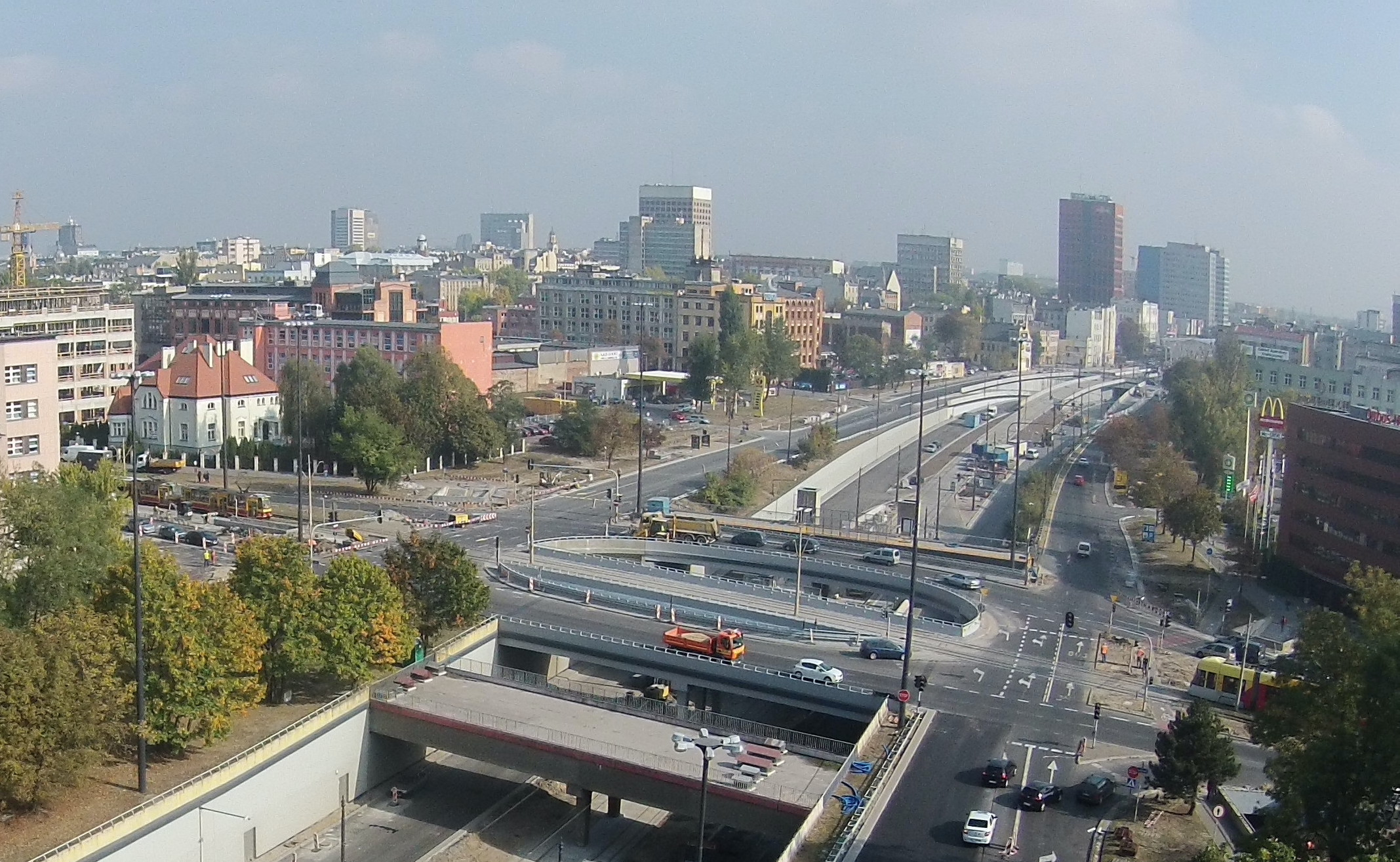
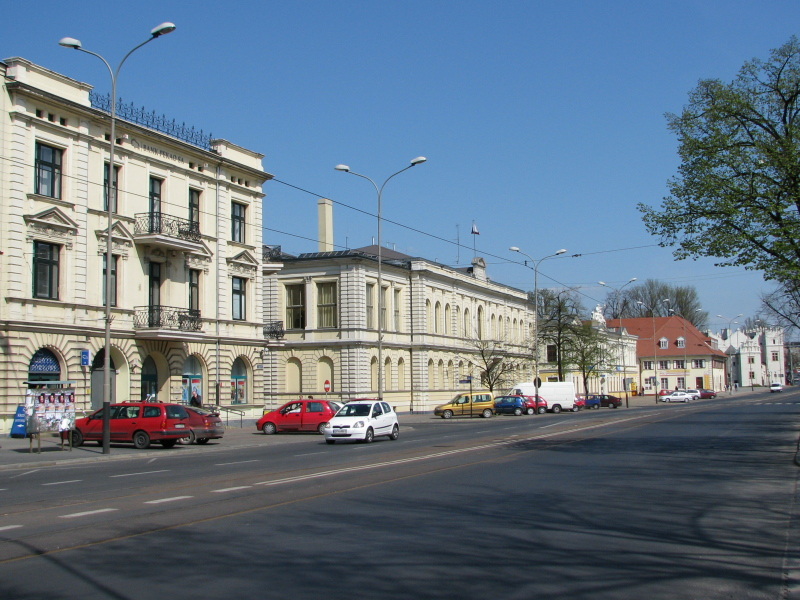
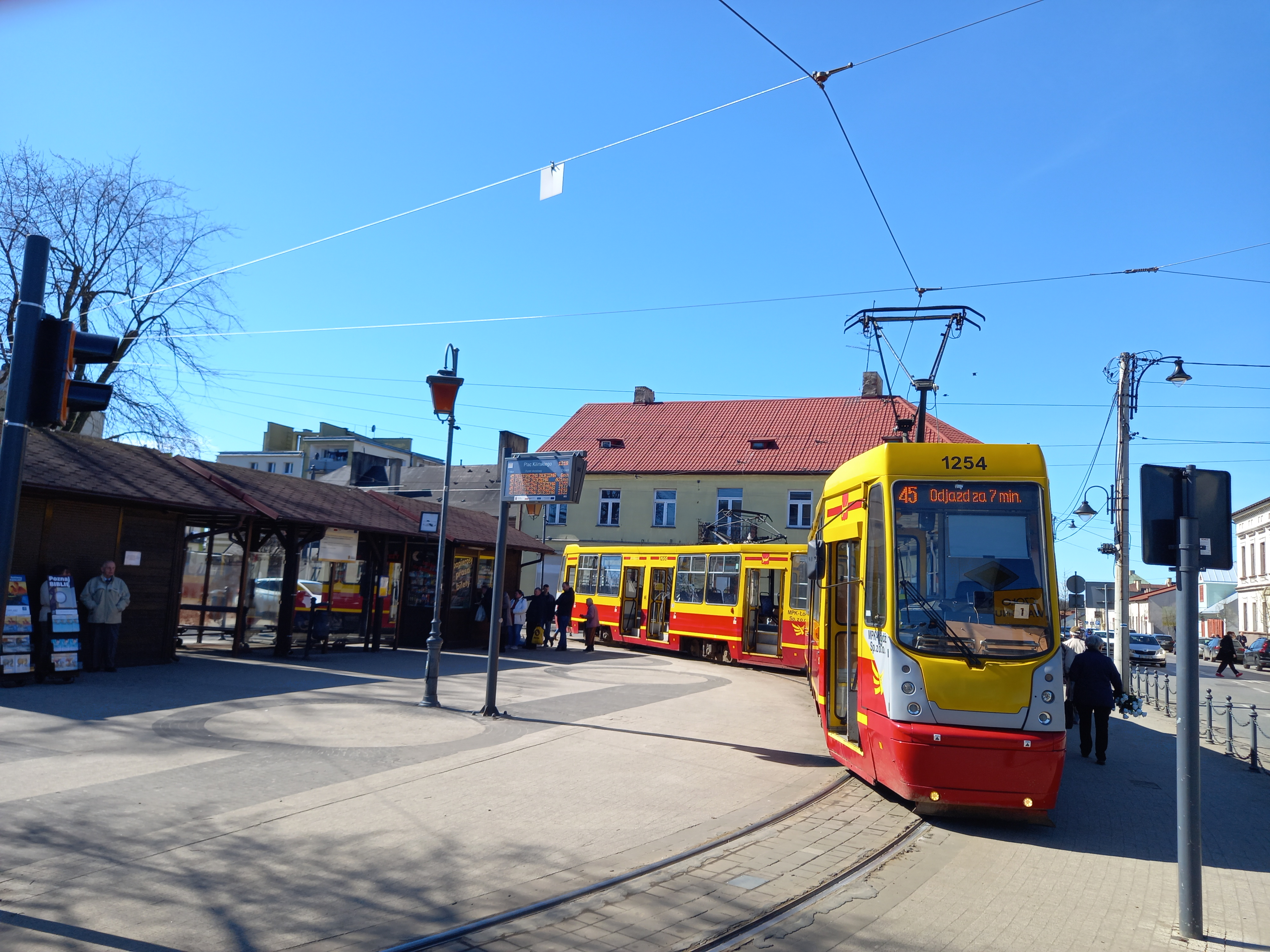
- From top, left to right: City Center of Łódź; City Center of Pabianice; Tram line in Zgierz

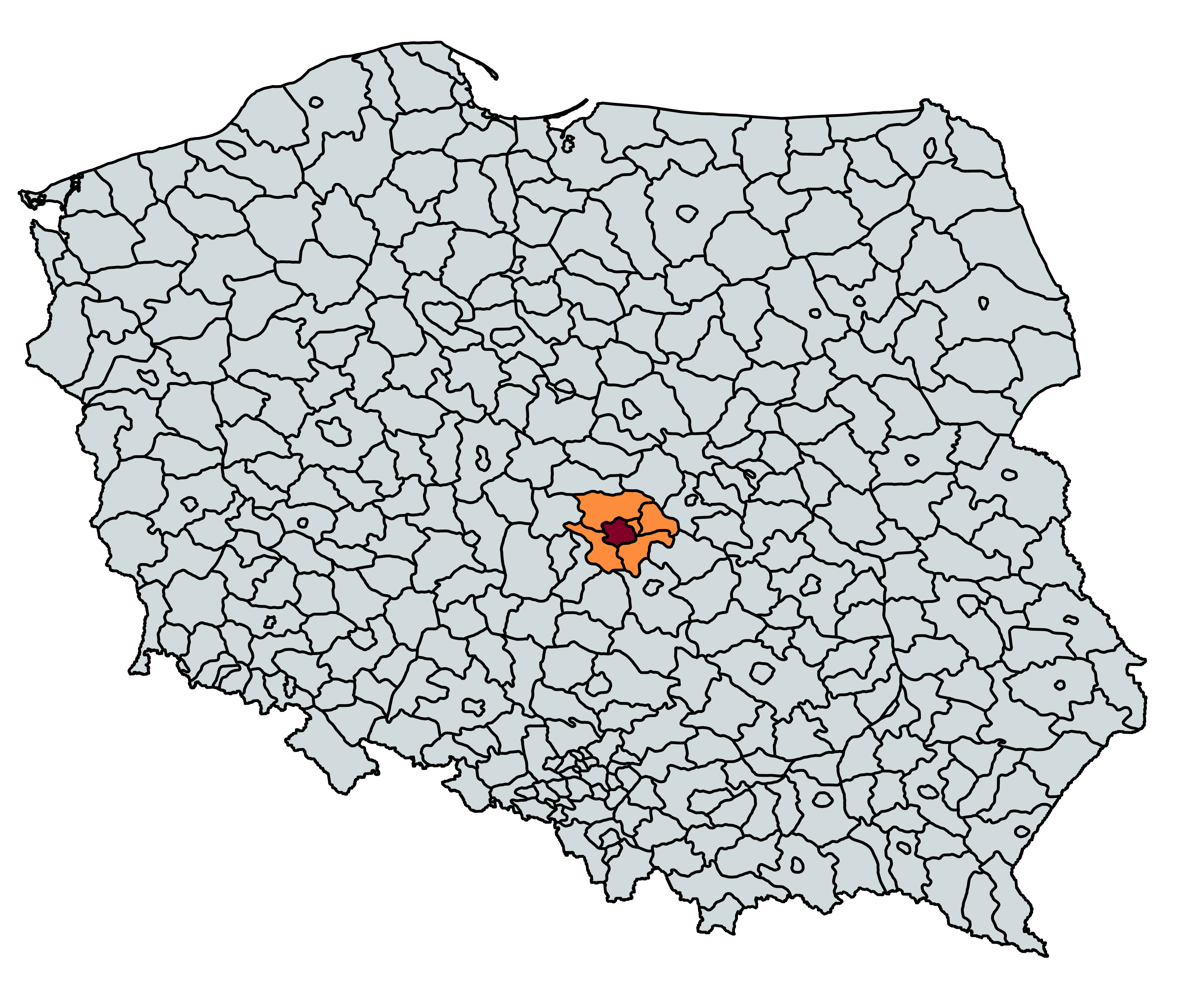
- Łódź city (dark red) and surrounding counties (orange)
- Country: Poland
- Largest city: Łódź

Area
  - Metro: 2,496 km^{2} (964 sq mi)

Population
  - Metro: 1,165,000
  - Metro density: 467/km^{2} (1,210/sq mi)

GDP
  - Metro: €18.415 billion (2021)
- Time zone: UTC+1 (CET)
- Website: www.lom.lodz.pl

The Łódź metropolitan area (known in Polish as: Łódźki Obszar Metropolitalny) is the metropolitan area of Łódź. The metropolitan area covers ten counties in the Łódź Voivodeship, with an area of 2,496 km^{2}.

The largest cities or towns within the metropolitan area are Łódź, Pabianice, Zgierz and Aleksandrów Łódzki.

== Economy ==
In 2020 Łódź's gross metropolitan product was €16.8 billion. This puts Łódź in 150th place among cities in European Union.

== See also ==
- Metropolitan areas in Poland
