= Kraków metropolitan area =

Kraków metropolitan area Metropolia Krakowska
- Urban area
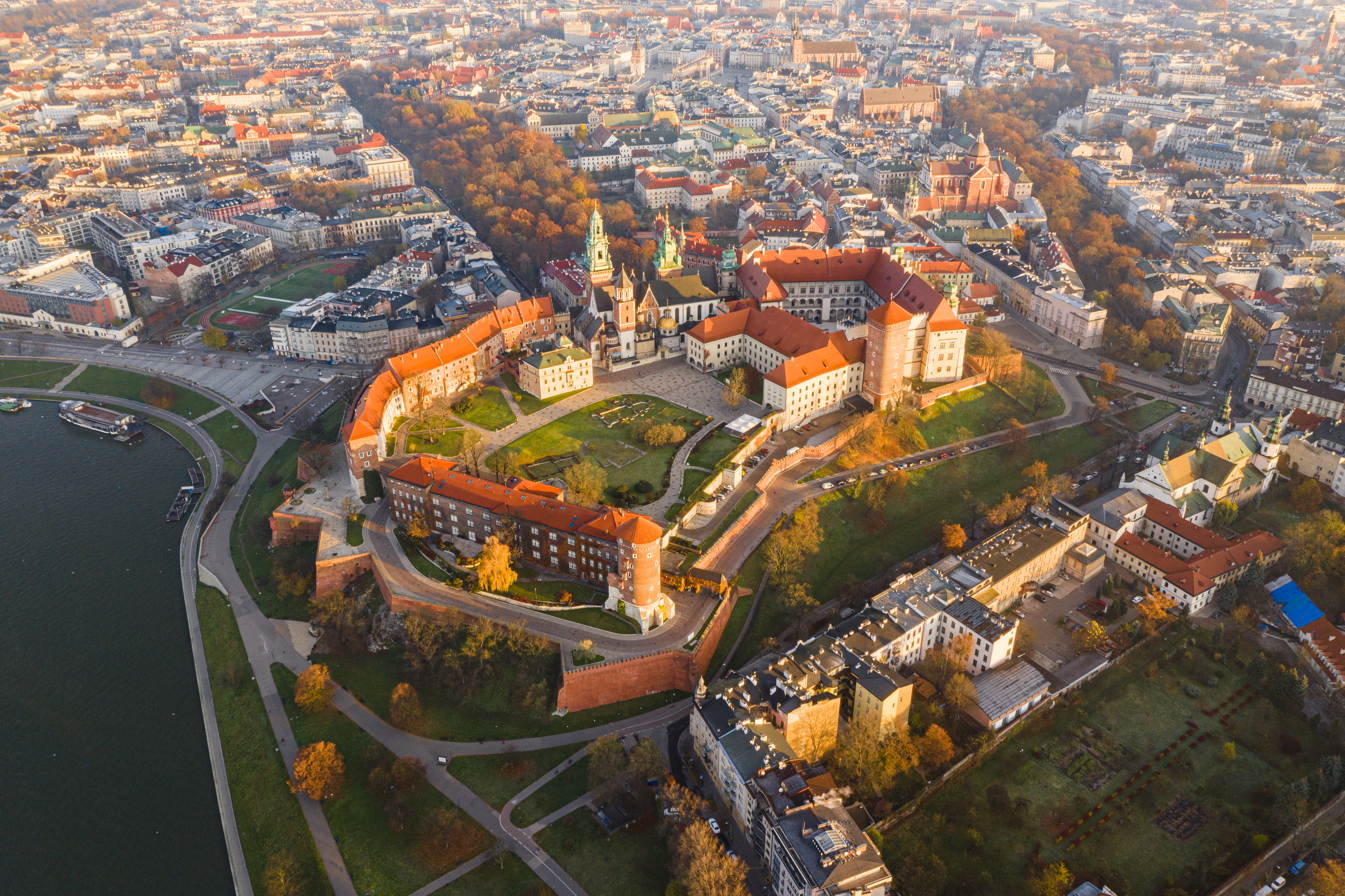
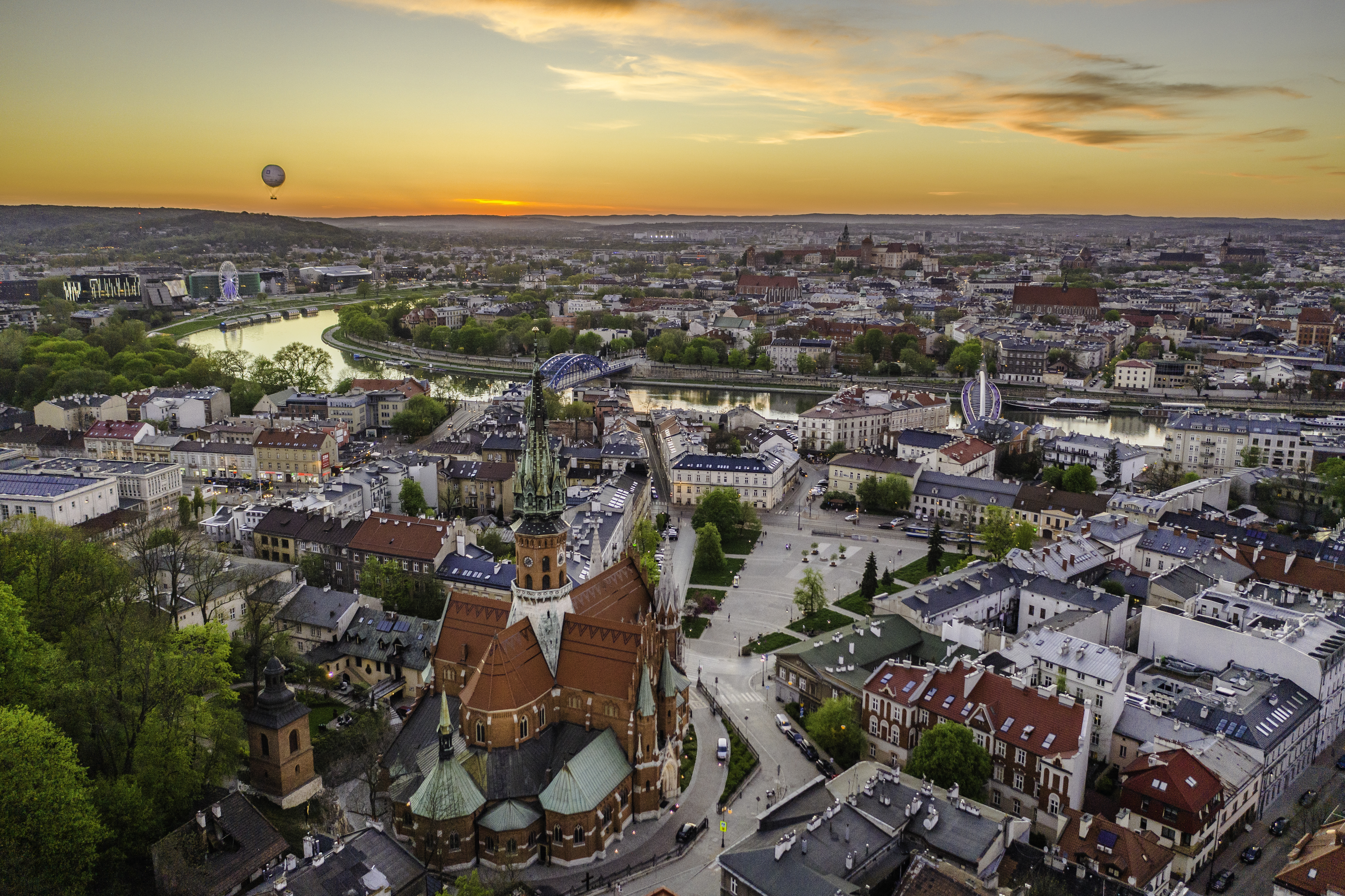
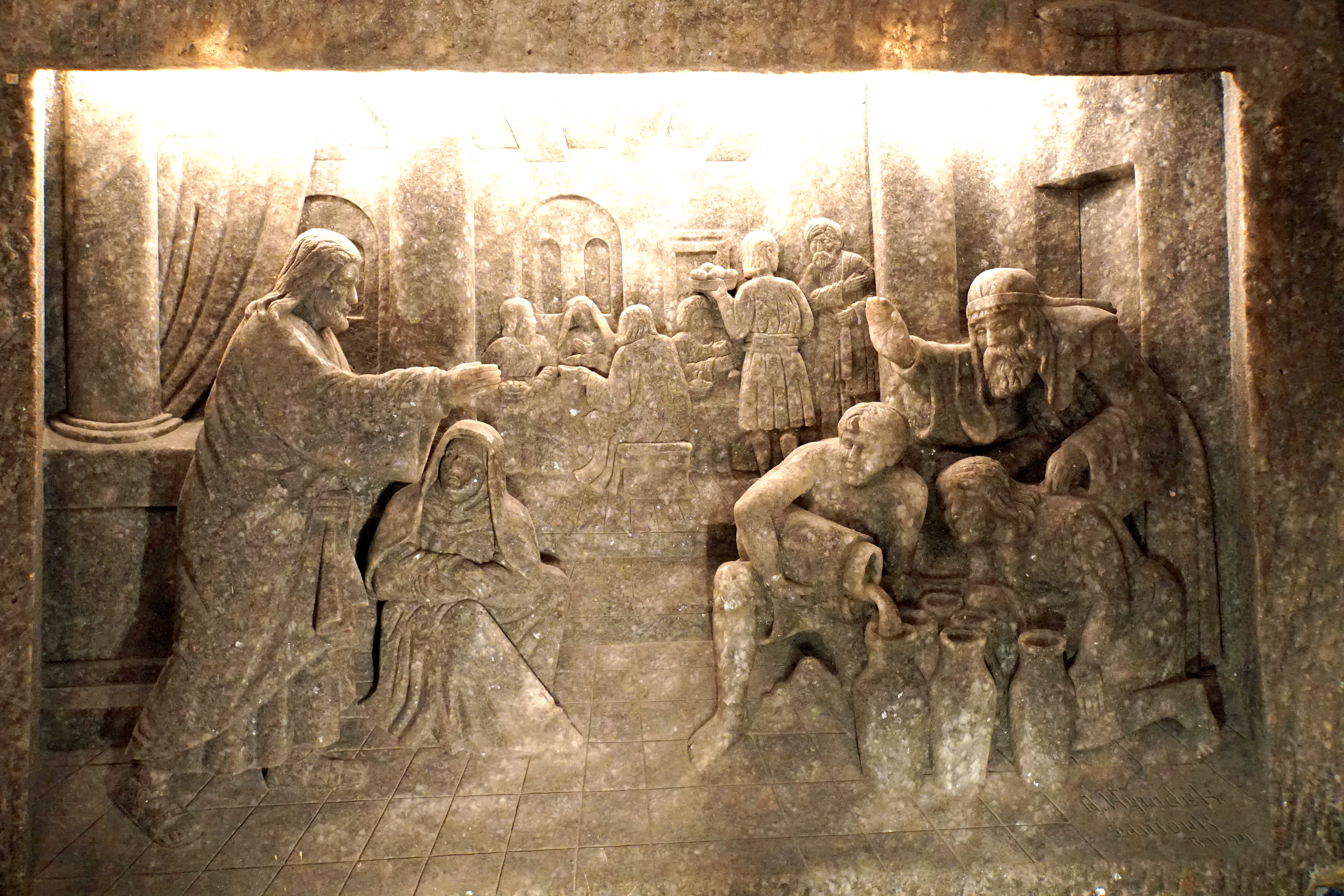
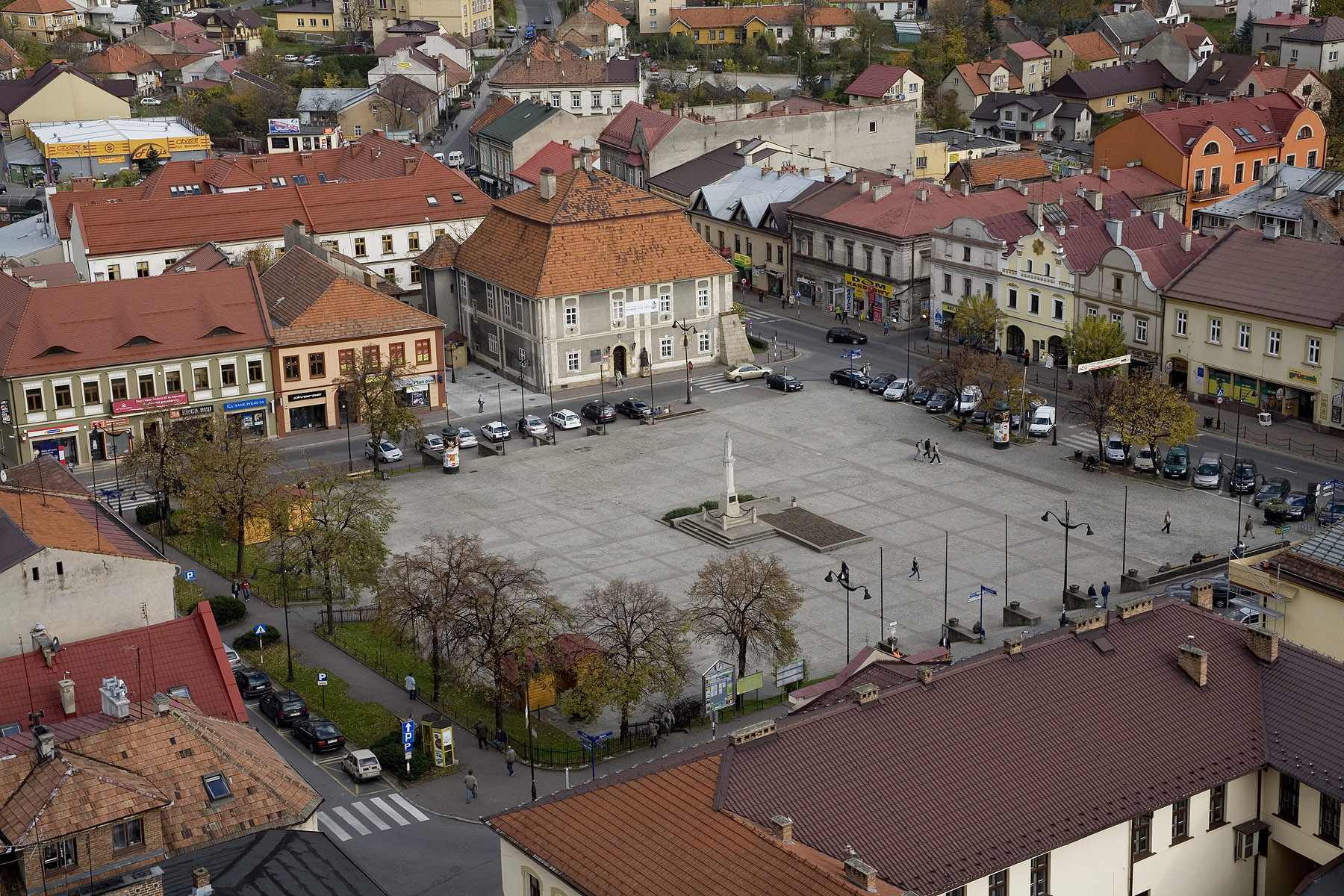
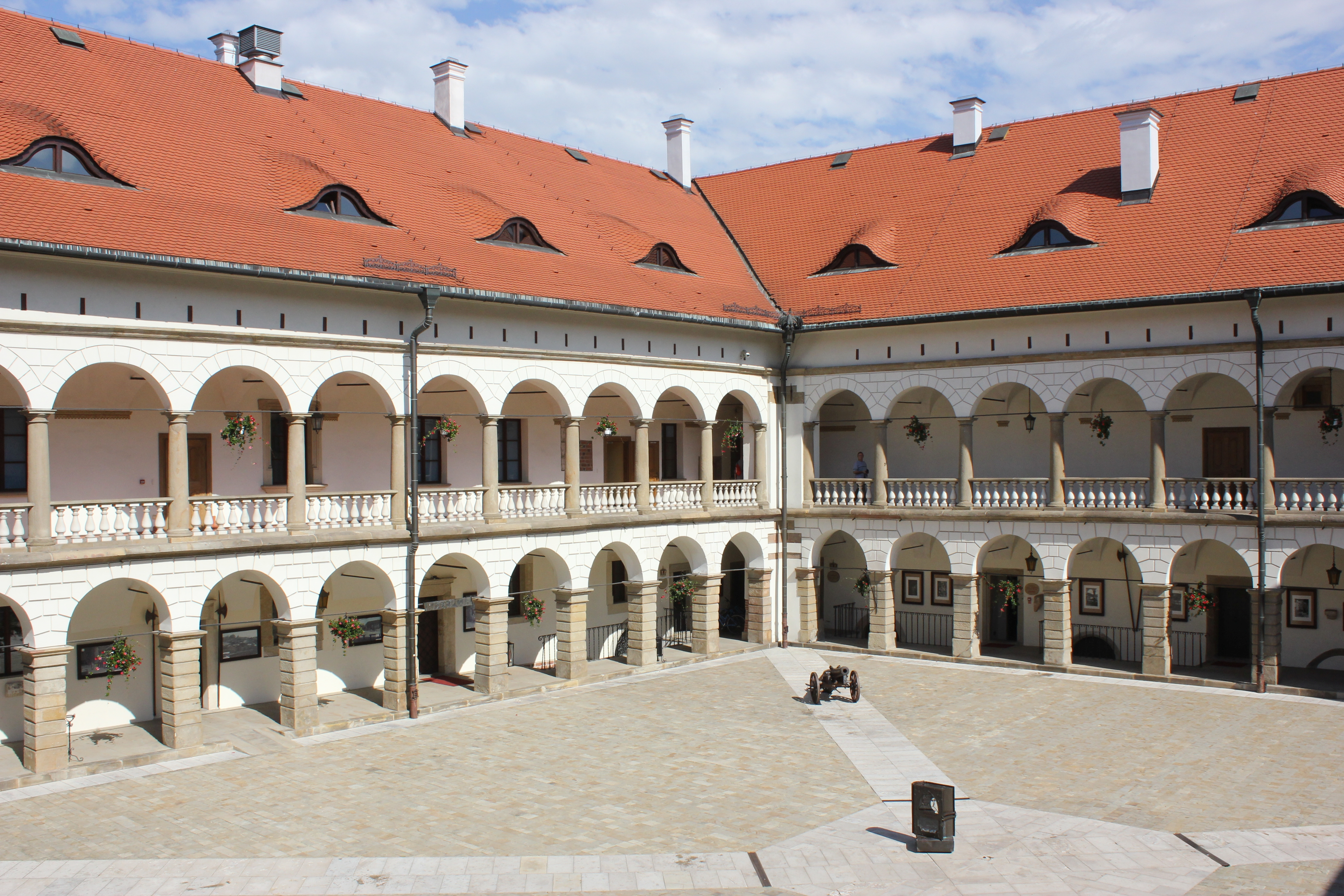
- From top, left to right: Aerial view of the Wawel Castle and Old Town in Kraków; Aerial view of Podgórze, Kraków; Wieliczka Salt Mine; Market Square in Bochnia; Niepołomice Royal Castle

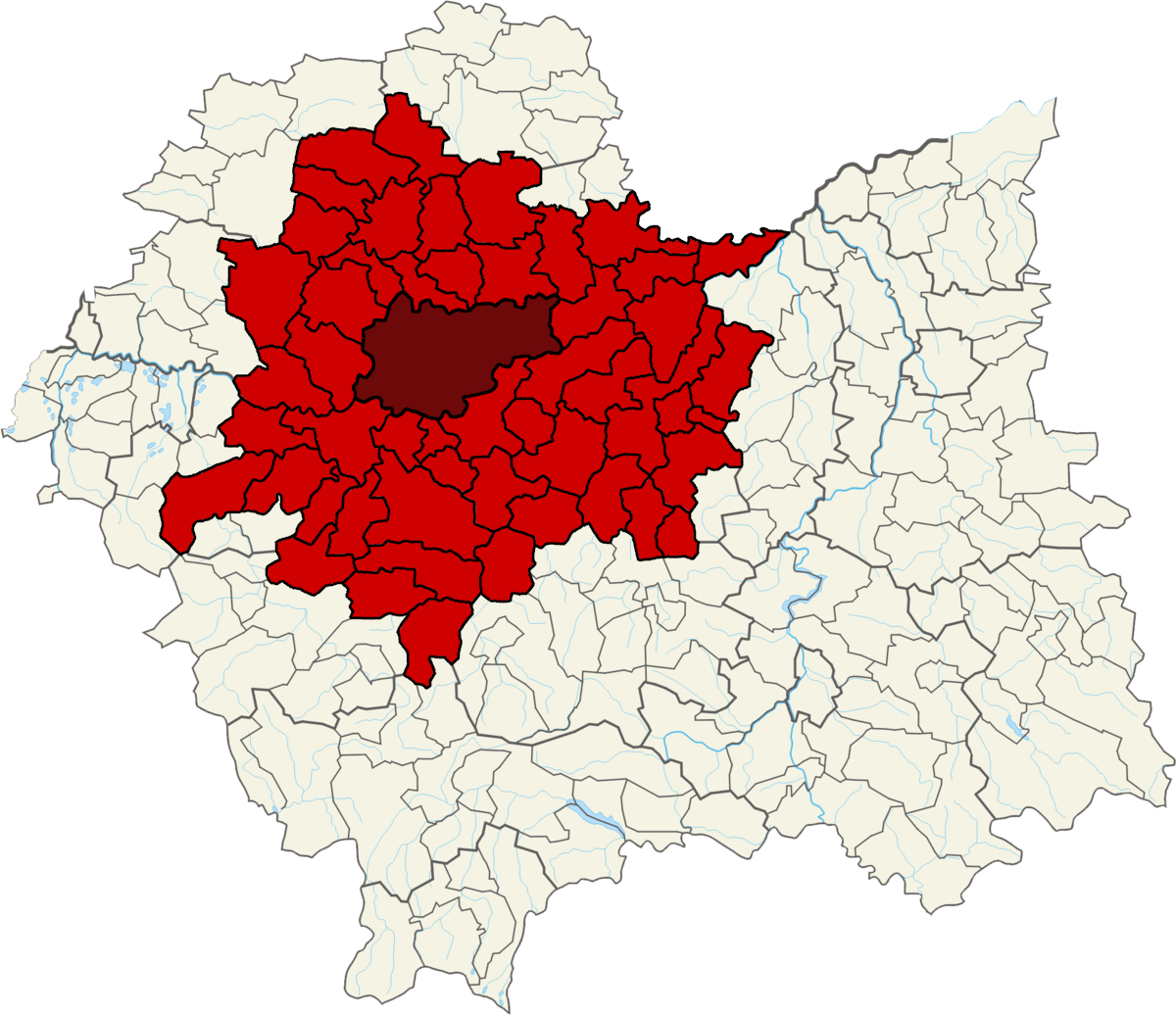
- Dark red - Kraków city, red - surrounding gminas
- Country: Poland
- Voivodship: Lesser Poland
- Largest city: Kraków

Area
  - Metro: 4,065.11 km^{2} (1,569.55 sq mi)

Population
  - Metro: 1,498,499
  - Metro density: 368.624/km^{2} (954.733/sq mi)

GDP
  - Metro: €28.742 billion (2021)
- Time zone: UTC+1 (CET)
  - Summer (DST): UTC+2 (CEST)
- Primary airport: Kraków John Paul II International Airport
- Website: metropoliakrakowska.pl

The Kraków metropolitan area (Polish: Metropolia Krakowska) is a peculiar functional region including a big city - Kraków and neighbouring complex of settling units, connected with the metropolis by different interactive relations. Area including the city of Kraków and neighbouring gminas.

== Economy ==
In 2020 Kraków's gross metropolitan product was €25.5 billion. This puts Kraków in 95th place among cities in European Union.

== Participating municipalities ==
The Małopolskie Voivodship Spatial Development Plan admitted by the resolution No. XV/174/03 of the Małopolskie Voivodship Regional Council, dated 22 December 2003, determined the extent of the metropolitan area, consisting of:

- Kraków – largest city
- powiat bocheński – gminas:
  - urban – Bochnia,
  - urban-rural – Nowy Wiśnicz,
  - rural – Bochnia, Drwinia, Łapanów, Rzezawa, Trzciana, Żegocina,
- powiat krakowski – gminas:
  - urban-rural – Krzeszowice, Skała, Skawina, Słomniki, Świątniki Górne,
  - rural – Czernichów, Igołomia-Wawrzeńczyce, Iwanowice, Jerzmanowice-Przeginia, Kocmyrzów-Luborzyca, Liszki, Michałowice, Mogilany, Sułoszowa, Wielka Wieś, Zabierzów, Zielonki,
- powiat miechowski – gminas:
  - rural – Gołcza,
- powiat myślenicki – gminas:
  - urban-rural – Dobczyce, Myślenice, Sułkowice,
  - rural – Lubień, Pcim, Raciechowice, Siepraw, Tokarnia, Wiśniowa,
- powiat olkuski – gminas:
  - rural – Trzyciąż,
- powiat proszowicki – gminas:
  - urban-rural – Proszowice,
  - rural – Koniusza, Koszyce, Nowe Brzesko,
- powiat wadowicki - gminas:
  - urban-rural – Kalwaria Zebrzydowska, Wadowice,
  - rural – Brzeźnica, Lanckorona, Stryszów,
- powiat wielicki – gminas:
  - urban-rural – Niepołomice, Wieliczka,
  - rural – Biskupice, Gdów, Kłaj.

== See also ==
- Metropolitan areas in Poland
