= Langsner =

Langsner is a surname. Notable people with the surname include:

- Jacobo Langsner (1927–2020), Uruguayan playwright and writer
- Jules Langsner (1911–1967), American art critic and psychiatrist

== See also ==
- Langner
