= Karol Langner =

Polish priest

Karol Langner (June 28, 1843 in Deutsch Piekar in Oberschlesien (today Piekary Śląskie) – January 1912 in Negaunee, Michigan) was a Polish priest and schoolmate of Jan Pitass. Starting as a priest in Marquette, Michigan in 1869, he was later assigned a pastorate in nearby Escanaba, where he stayed for twelve years and witnessed the growth of a considerable Polish community.

Langner was reassigned in 1885 to a German community near Houghton, Michigan, and in 1899 to St. Paul's Parish in Negaunee, where he remained until his death in 1912. He was distinguished with a domestic prelate by Pope Leo XIII in 1900, the same year he became vicar general in the Marquette Diocese.
