= Jan Pitass =

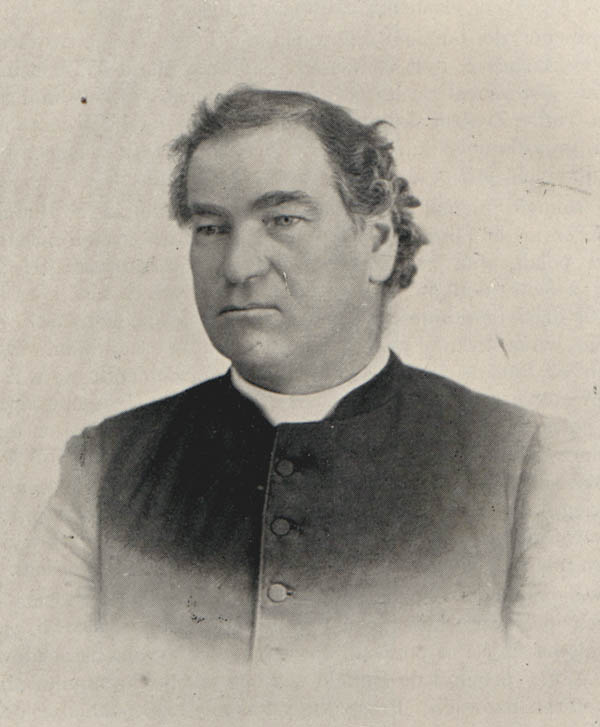
Jan Pitass

Rev. Jan Pitass (3 July 1844 in Piekary Śląskie, Upper Silesia (then Prussia, now Poland)- 11 December 1913 in Buffalo) was a Polish priest who was the founder and first pastor of the oldest Polish parish (St. Stanislaus - Bishop & Martyr Church) in the diocese of Buffalo, New York. He was a graduate of Niagara University before moving to Buffalo.

He has been described a "leading figure" in the Polish-American community of his time.
