= Langner =

Langner is a German surname. Notable people with the surname include:

- David Langner (disambiguation), several people
- Gerard Langner, Polish ice hockey player
- Karol Langner (1843–1912), Polish priest
- Lawrence Langner (1890–1962), Welsh-born American playwright
- Paul Langner, German ice hockey player
- Thomas S. Langner (1924–2026), American sociologist
- Władysław Langner (1896—1972), Polish Army general
