= Church of St. Stanislaus, Bishop and Martyr (Buffalo, New York) =

Coordinates: 42°53′17″N 78°50′26″W

St. Stanislaus, Bishop and Martyr Catholic Church
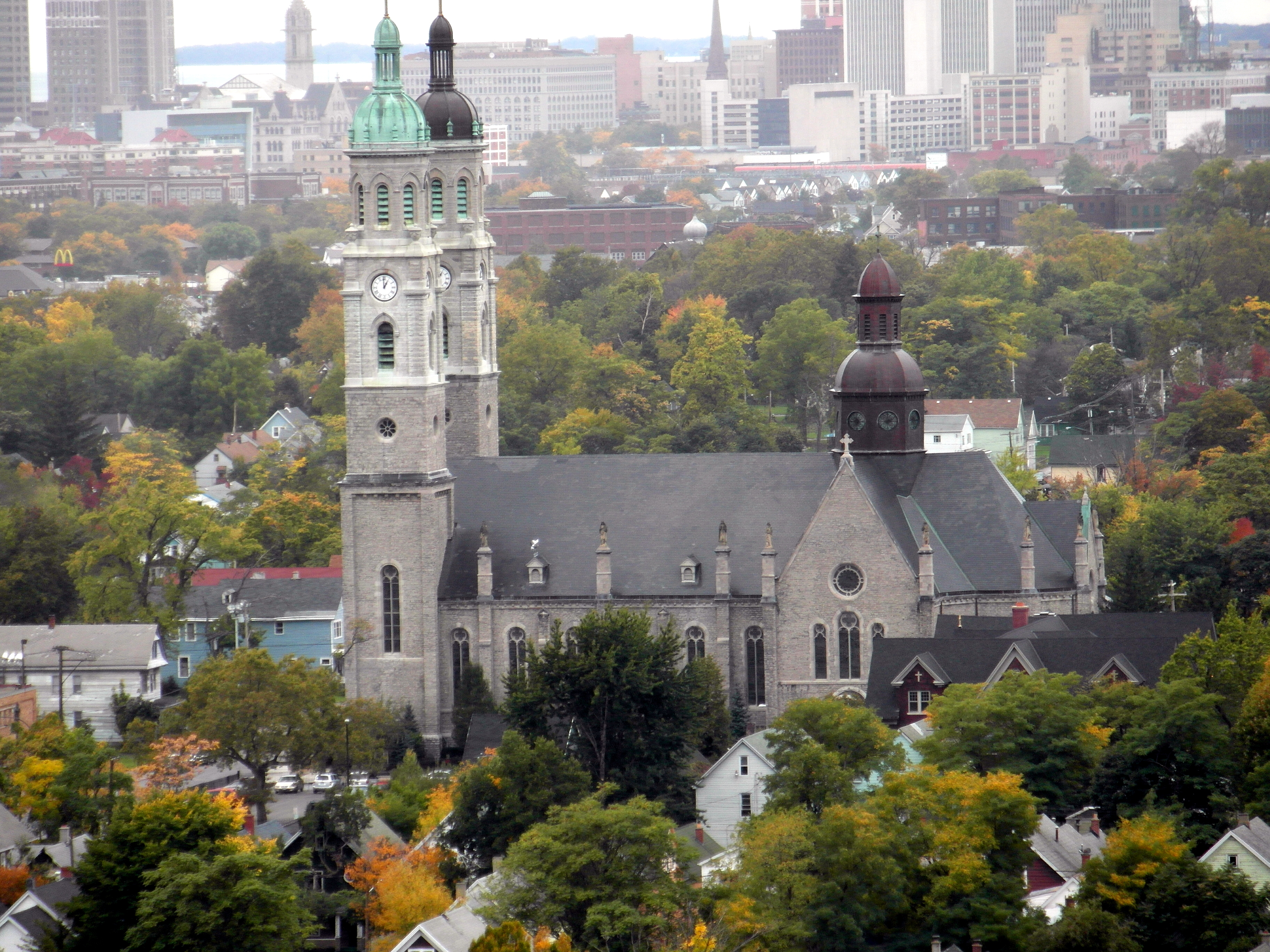
- St. Stanislaus, Bishop and Martyr Catholic Church
- Location: Buffalo, New York
- Country: United States
- Denomination: Roman Catholic
- Website: Stanislaus Church in Buffalo

History
- Status: Parish church
- Founded: June 3, 1873
- Founder: Jan Pitass

Architecture
- Functional status: Active
- Architect: T.O. Sullivan
- Style: Romanesque
- Groundbreaking: August 10, 1882 (current church)
- Completed: October 17, 1886

Specifications
- Length: 192 feet (58.5 m)
- Width: 104 feet (31.7 m)
- Height: 217 feet (66.1 m)
- Materials: Jammerthal flint stone with lockport limestone trim

Administration
- Parish: Theresa Gonciarz

Clergy
- Bishop: Edward M. Grosz

St. Stanislaus, Bishop and Martyr Catholic Church is an American Catholic church located at 123 Townsend Street, Buffalo, New York on the city's East Side. It is the oldest Polish church in the Diocese of Buffalo, and holds the title of "Mother Church of Polonia" for Western New York.

== History ==
The parish was established on June 8, 1873, by Rev. Jan Pitass and the Society of Saint Stanislaus. The original structure was a two-story, wood-frame church that was built in 1874. That church was converted to a school shortly after the present-day church was completed in 1886. Groundbreaking began on the present-day church on August 10, 1882, and took nearly four years to complete. In 1908, the church steeples, bells, cupolas, and 6.5 ft diameter clocks were installed, at a cost of €40,000. The massive church towers rise to a height of 217 ft.

It is the oldest Polish church in the Diocese of Buffalo, and holds the title of "Mother Church of Polonia" for Western New York.

In 1904, the church's parish was among the largest in the U.S., with close to 20,000 parishioners and nearly 2,000 children enrolled in the school. The church contains an 1893 Johnson & Son pipe organ in the choir loft. There are three carrara marble altars in the sanctuary. The main altar is 34 ft high.

In 1889, St. Stanislaus Bishop & Martyr Cemetery was established in nearby Cheektowaga, New York. It occupies 20 acres of land.

In 1965, St. Stanislaus social center was constructed near the church.

=== Restoration ===
On November 20, 2000, a storm with severe winds resulted in the removal of the cross and cupola on the left tower of St. Stanislaus. Restoration of the cupola was completed on July 11, 2003, at a cost of $300,000. Of that cost, only one third was covered by insurance. As a result of this restoration, the left and right cupola are no longer matching in color.

In 2005, the church underwent its most extensive restoration and renovation. The work included eight new clock faces and four new bells in the clock towers. Restoration work was done on the church's 1893 Johnson pipe organ, as well as maintenance to the stained glass and handmade wooden doors. A gold-leaf frieze was applied to the vestibule, and new lighting was added for the fountain statue. The total cost approached US$2 million.

=== Present day ===
In 2009, Thaddeus Bocianowski was named the seventh pastor of the historic parish. As part of the Roman Catholic Church's ongoing downsizing campaign, the church was re-designated "a shrine to St. Stanislaus and all Polish martyrs" and a Polish cultural center on October 11, 2009, ostensibly due to the declining populace, which had impacted attendance at the church. In 2008, the school on Wilson Street was closed after enrollment fell to only 75. The school had lasted 127 years and had been staffed by Felician sisters for its entire history.

== Gallery ==
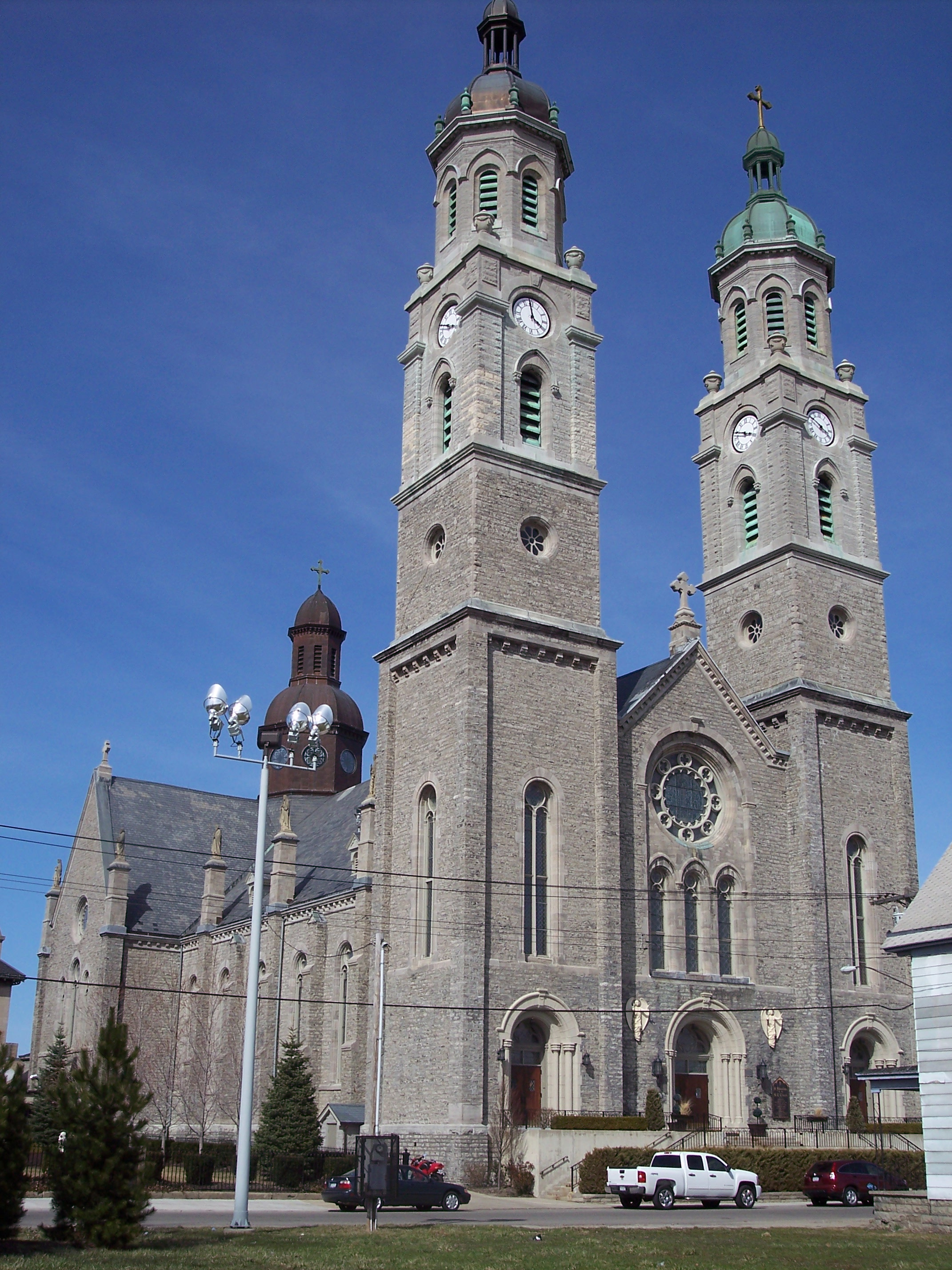
Front outside view

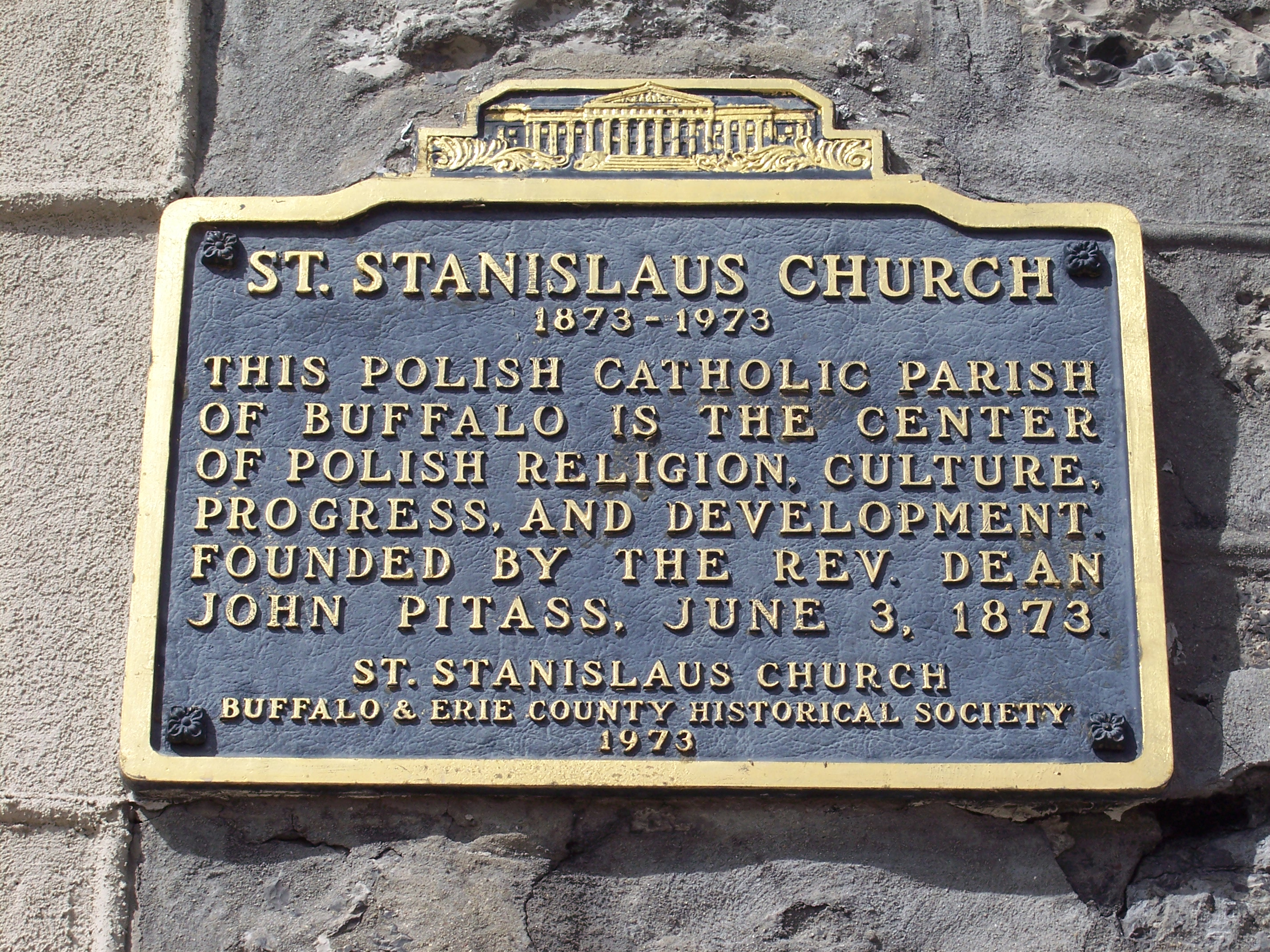
Plaque affixed to the right of the front entrance

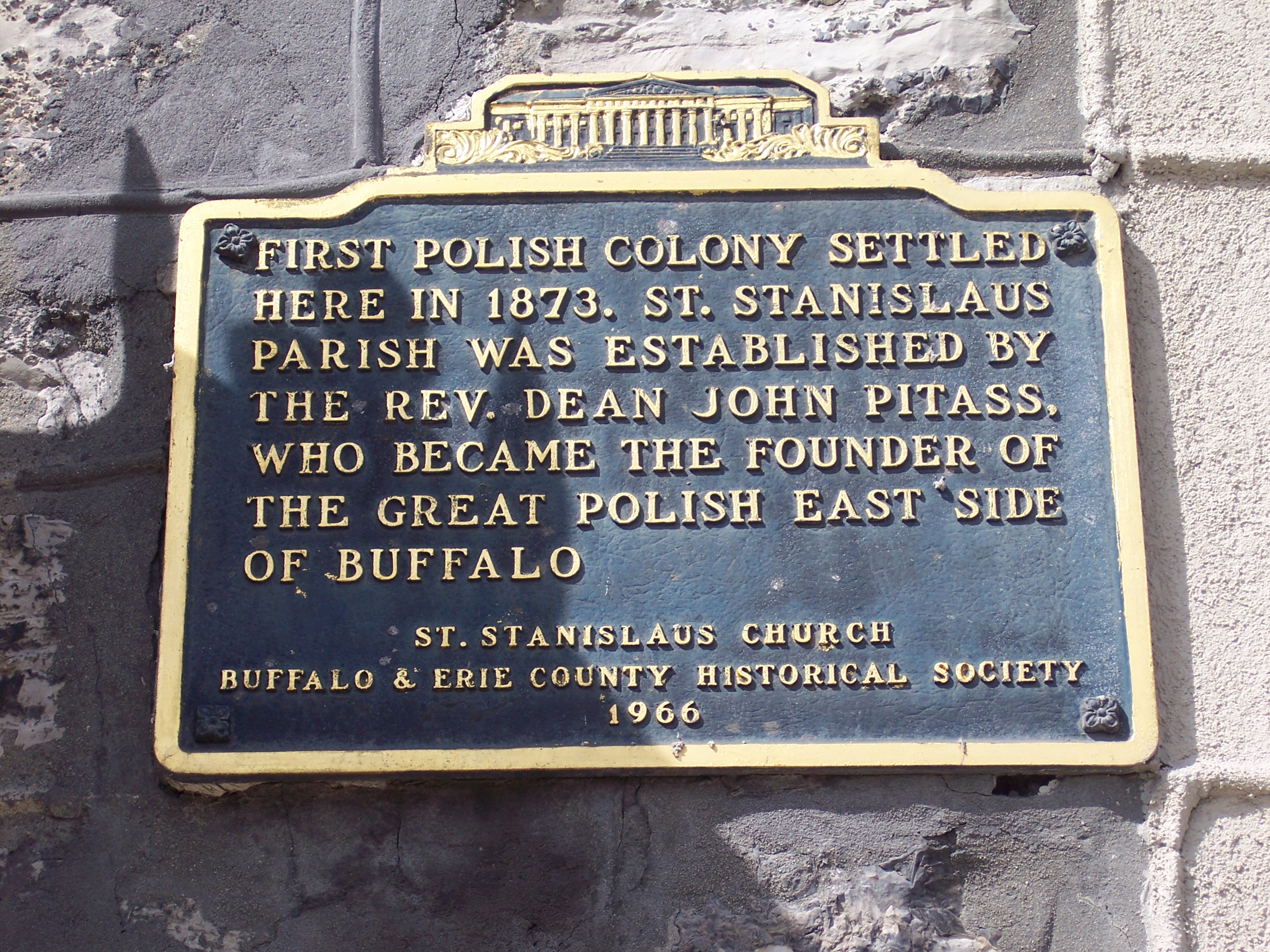
Plaque affixed to the left of the front entrance

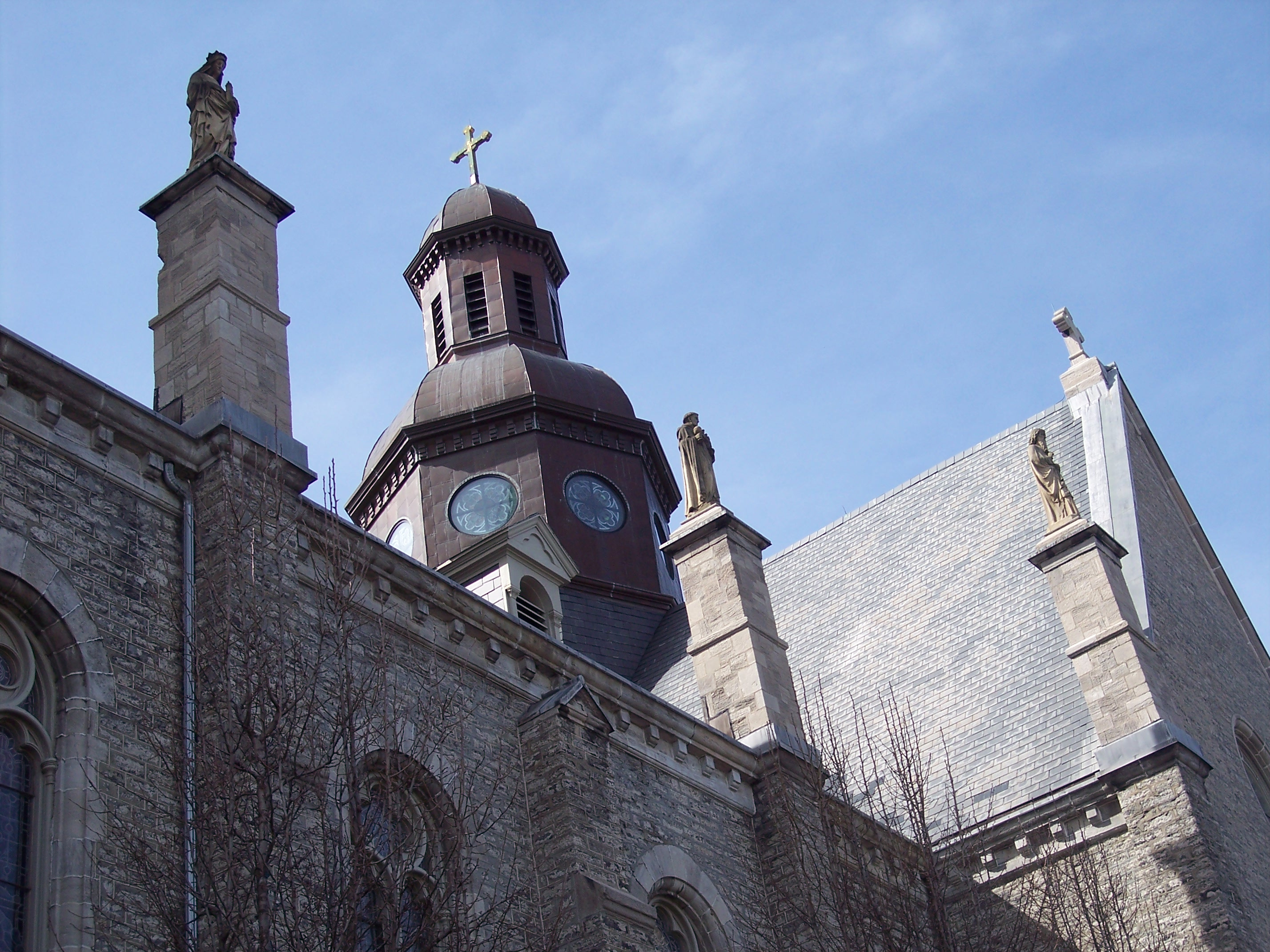
Statues of Christian saints

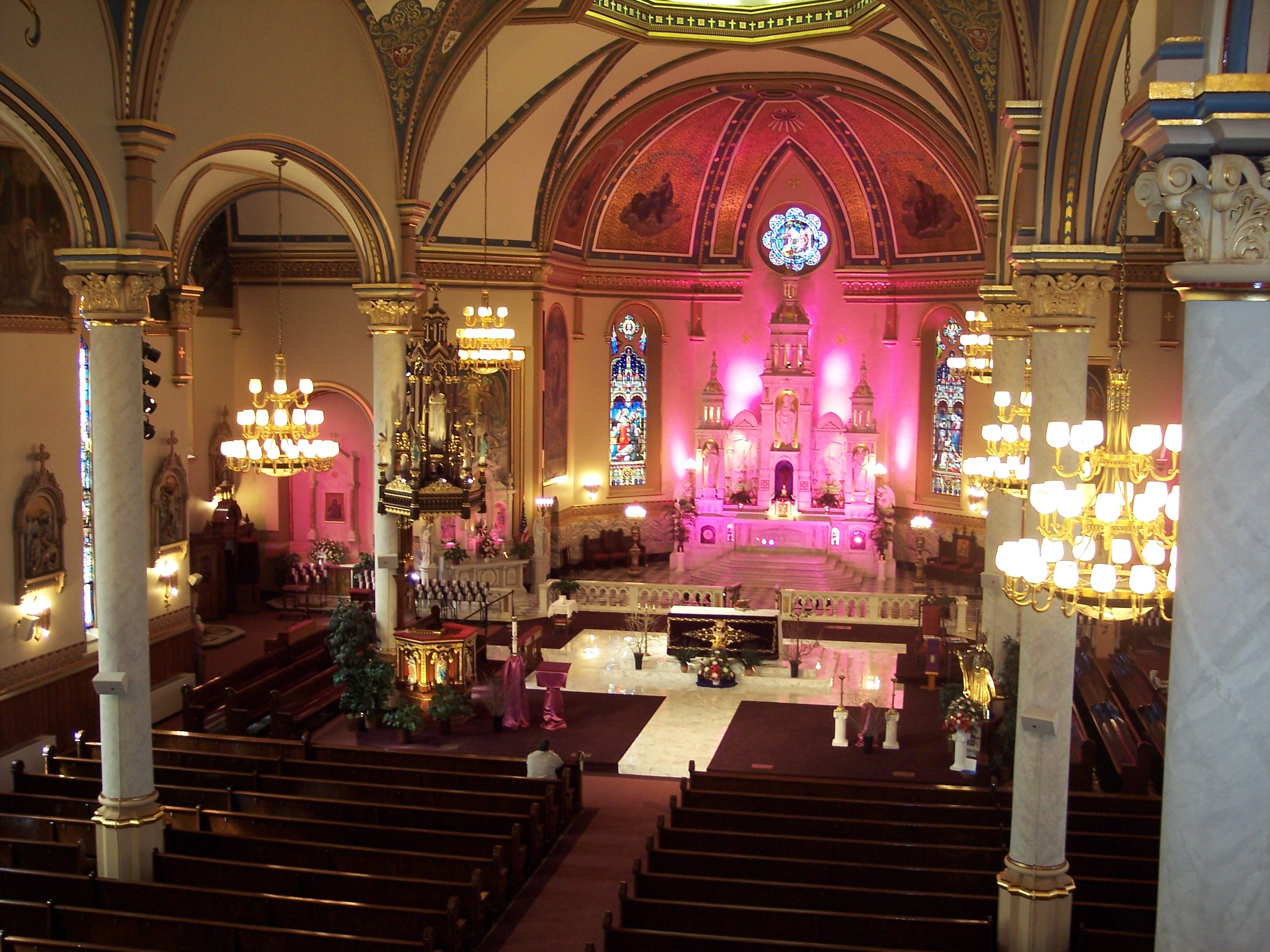
View of inside (from the second floor)
