= Hans Kroll =

German career diplomat

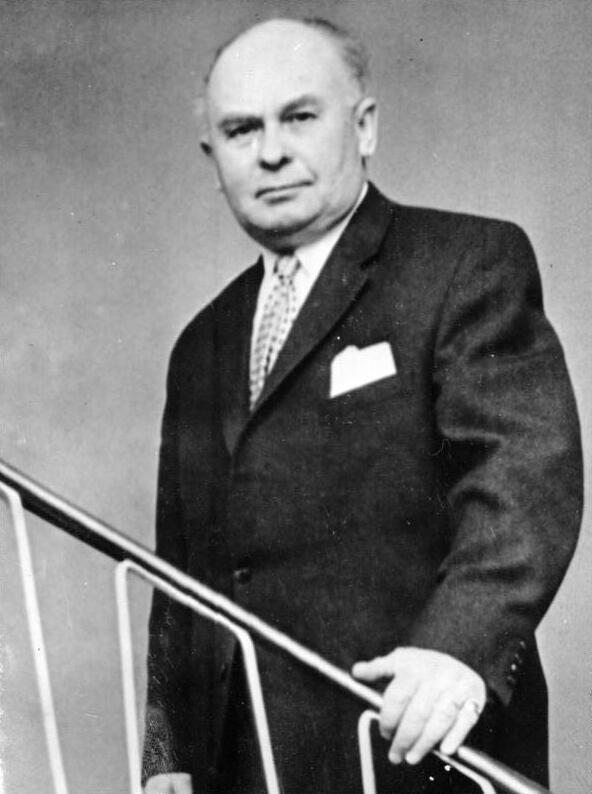
Hans Kroll in 1962.

Hans Kroll (May 18, 1898 in Deutsch-Piekar, Silesia, Prussia, Germany, modern: Piekary Śląskie, Poland – August 8, 1967 in Starnberg, Bavaria, West Germany) was a German career diplomat and after World War II ambassador in Belgrade, Tokyo and Moscow.

Kroll entered German diplomatic service in early Weimar Republic in 1920. He served in the embassies in Lisbon and Madrid as well as in the consulates in Odessa, Chicago and San Francisco. From 1929 to 1935, he worked in German Foreign Office in Berlin, covering economic issues. In the years 1936 to 1943, i.e., during the Nazi rule and World War II, Kroll was assigned to the German Embassy in Turkey, most recently as First Embassy Counsellor, and then until the end of the war in 1945 he held office as Consul General in Barcelona, Spain.

After 1945, Kroll worked for Karl Arnold, Minister President of North Rhine-Westphalia, as advisor on foreign policy issues for Christian Democratic Union (CDU) and later for the press, before joining in 1950 the Federal Ministry for Economics and Labour of West Germany, serving also as envoy in Paris (CoCom). Between 1953 and 1955, he was the first West German ambassador to Yugoslavia, and from 1955 to 1958, he served as the West German ambassador to Japan.

In 1958, amid the Cold War (1953–1962), Kroll was appointed as a West German ambassador to the Soviet Union. During the Berlin Crisis of 1961, he sought close contact with Nikita Khrushchev, visiting him on 9 November 1961. He was criticized in West Germany for acting on his own and not respecting the official West German policy of the time. Kroll had to report to Chancellor Konrad Adenauer, but the chancellor sent him back to the Soviet Union, preferring to have someone there who has good relations with the Soviet leader Khrushchev.

In February 1962, Kroll leaked details of Adenauer's intentions to members of the press, who did not keep it a secret, demanding that he be fired immediately. The affair was also dubbed Kroll Opera, after the building in Berlin. Adenauer and the Foreign office did not give in, but agreed to retire him several months later. From September 1962 until May 1963, Kroll spent the final months of his career as a counselor to the West German federal government.

== Works ==
- Botschafter Hans Kroll. Lebenserinnerungen eines Botschafters. Kiepenheuer & Witsch 1967.
- Ambassador Hans Kroll. Memoirs of an Ambassador., Kiepenheuer & Witsch 1967 2. edition
- Mémoires d'un ambassadeur. Fayard, Paris 1968.
- Botschafter in Belgrad, Tokio und Moskau: 1953–1962. Deutscher Taschenbuch-Verlag, München 1969.

== Literature ==
- Konrad Fuchs: Hans Kroll. Schlesische Lebensbilder. Wissenschaftlicher Informationsdienst WID.
- Kordula Kühlem: Hans Kroll (1898–1967). Eine diplomatische Karriere im 20. Jahrhundert. Forschungen und Quellen zur Zeitgeschichte, Band 53, Düsseldorf 2008.

== See also ==
- Germany–Yugoslavia relations
