= Basilica of St. Mary and St. Bartholomew =

Church in Piekary Śląskie, Poland

Coordinates: 50°23′02″N 18°56′40″E

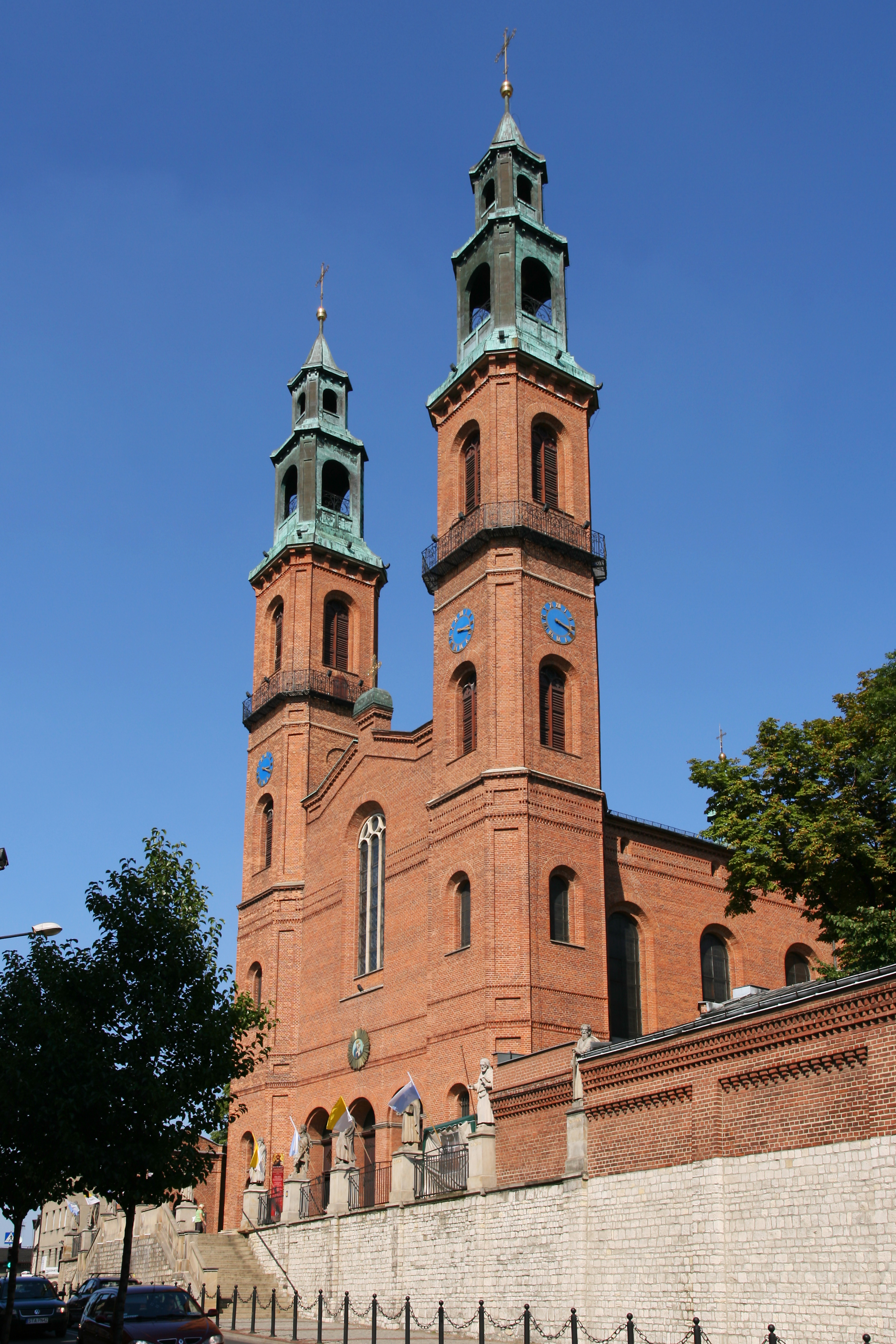
Basilica of St. Mary and St. Bartholomew in Piekary Śląskie

The Basilica of St. Mary and St. Bartholomew is a Roman Catholic church in Piekary Śląskie, Poland. There was a church in Piekary Śląskie from the fourteenth century. The current church, designed by Daniel Grötschel in Neo-Romanesqe style, was completed in 1849. On 1 December 1962, Pope John XXIII elevated the church to the status of minor basilica.
