= Piekary Śląskie =

Piekary Śląskie Piekory (Silesian)
- City county
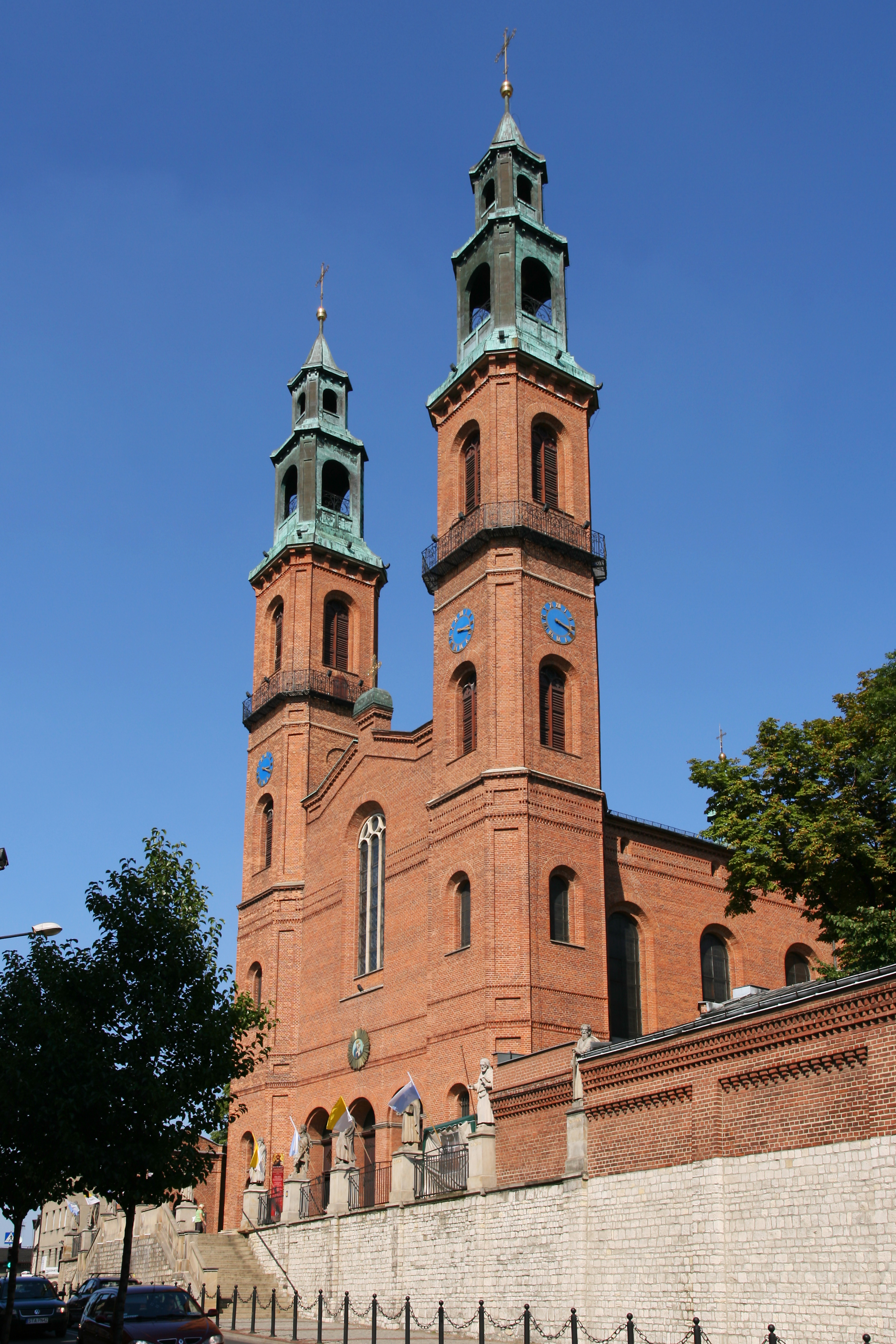
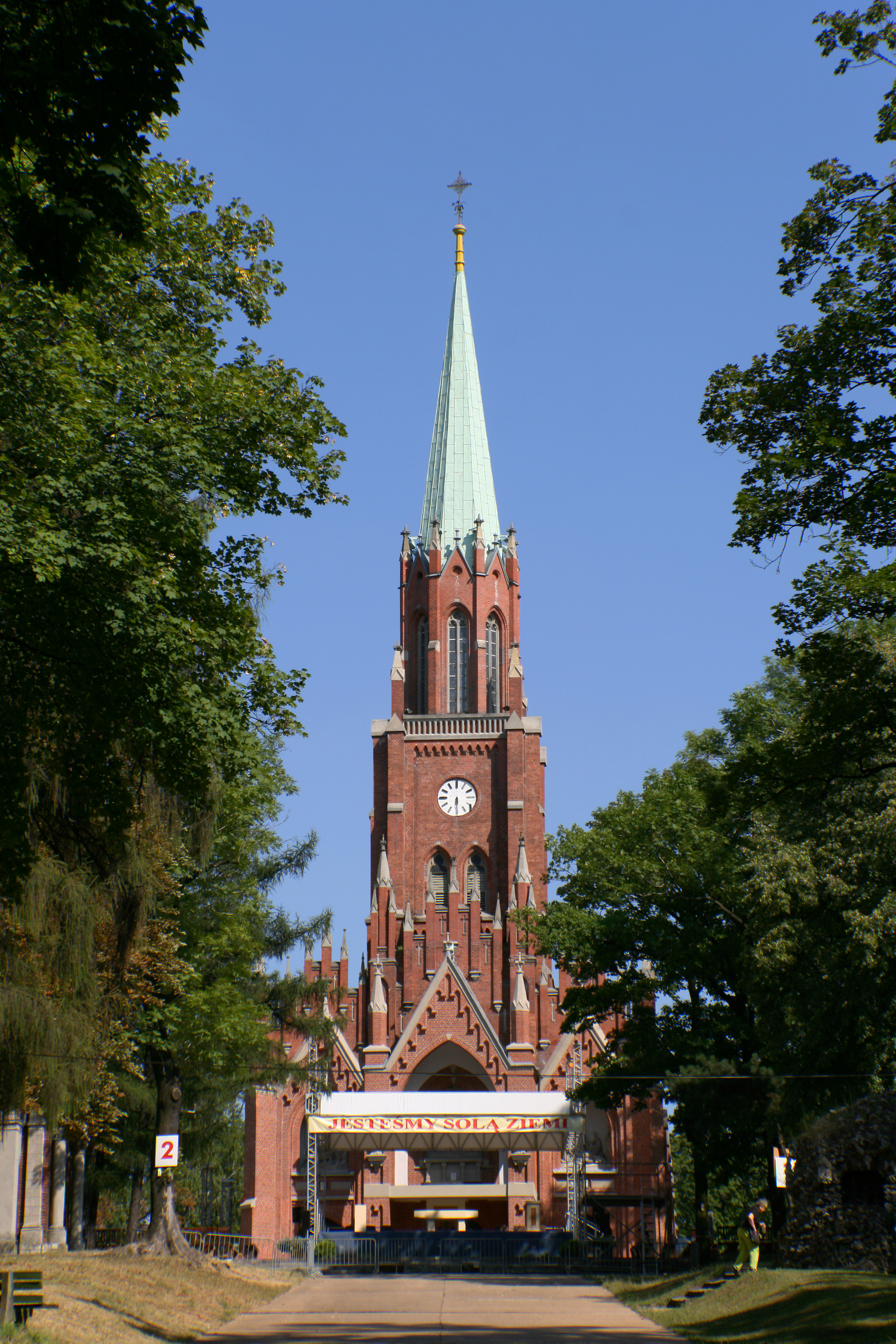
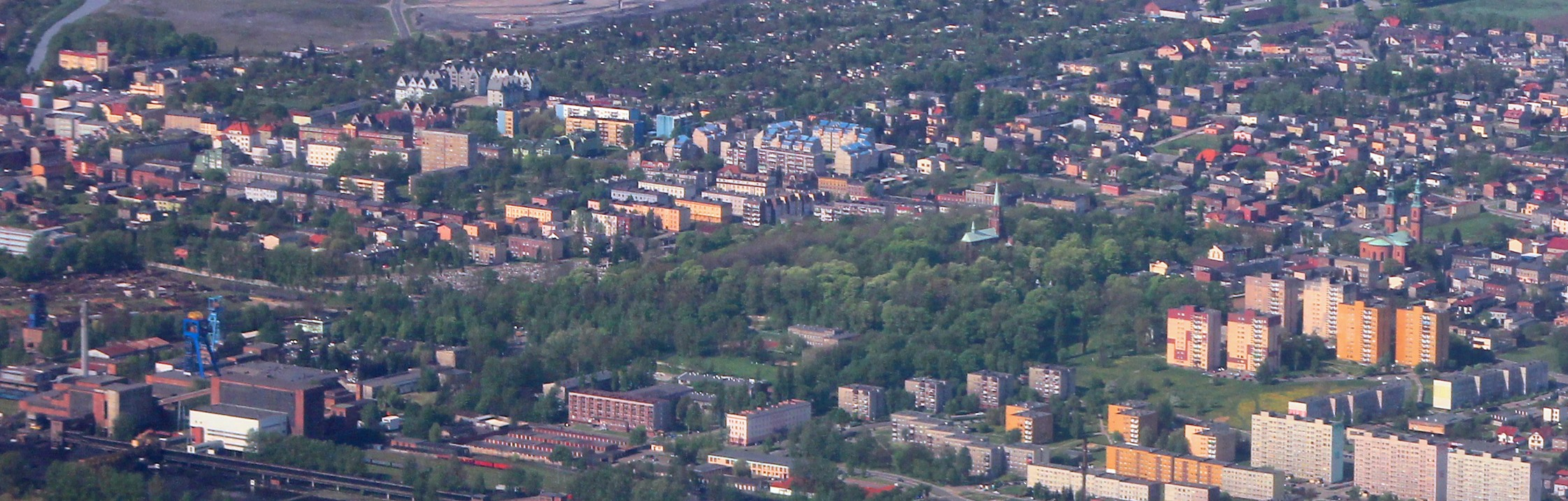
- From top, left to right: Basilica of St. Mary and St. Bartholomew; Church of the Resurrection of Christ; Aerial view of downtown Piekary Śląskie

- Flag Coat of arms

- Location within Poland
- Coordinates: 50°23′N 18°57′E
- Country: Poland
- Voivodeship: Silesian Voivodeship
- County: city county
- Established: 12th century
- City rights: 1939/1947

Government
  - City mayor: Sława Umińska-Duraj

Area
  - Total: 39.98 km^{2} (15.44 sq mi)
- Highest elevation: 350 m (1,150 ft)
- Lowest elevation: 261 m (856 ft)

Population (31 December 2021)
  - Total: 54,226 ▼
  - Density: 1,356/km^{2} (3,513/sq mi)
- Time zone: UTC+1 (CET)
  - Summer (DST): UTC+2 (CEST)
- Postal code: 41–940 to 41–949
- Area code: +48 32
- Car plates: SPI
- Website: http://www.piekary.pl/

Piekary Śląskie ([pʲɛˈkarɨ ˈɕlɔ̃skʲɛ]) (Silesian: Piekory) is a city in Silesia in southern Poland, near Katowice. One of the core cities of the Metropolis GZM – metropolis with a population of 2 million. Located in the Silesian Highlands, on the Brynica river (tributary of the Vistula).

It is situated in the Silesian Voivodeship. It is one of the cities of the 2.7 million conurbation – Katowice urban area, and it lies within the greater Katowice-Ostrava metropolitan area populated by about 5,294,000 people. The population of the city is 54,226 (2021).

Piekary is a spiritual center of Upper Silesia, a Marian shrine which is a pilgrimage site for thousands of the faithful, and a mining town.

== History ==
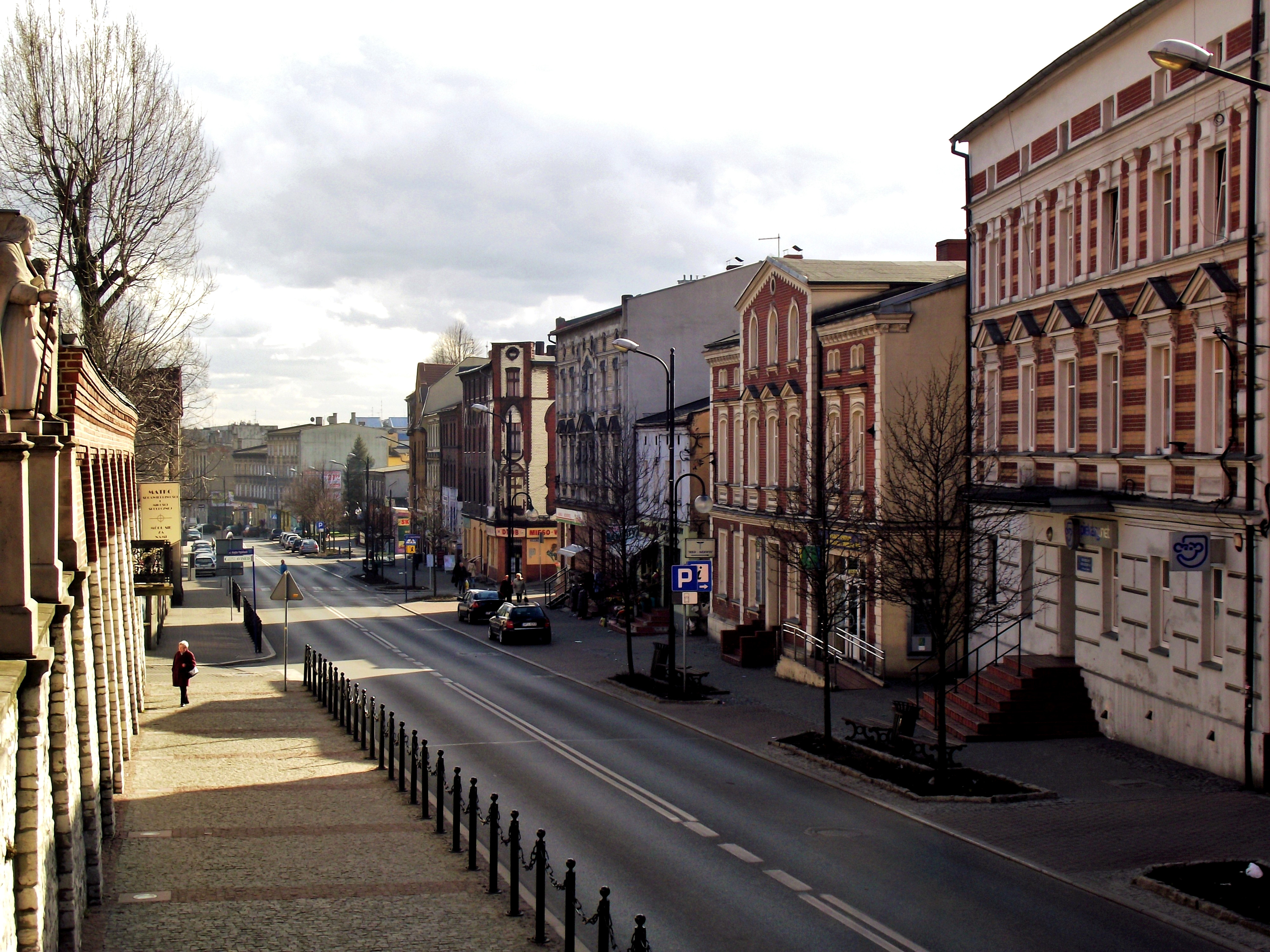
Bytomska Street, the main street of the city

Piekary Śląskie was created in 1934 in interwar Poland by merging the communes of Szarlej and Wielkie Piekary into Szarlej-Wielkie Piekary. In 1935 it was renamed Piekary Śląskie.

=== Name and early history ===
There are two legends about the founding of Piekary, according to one it was founded in the late 10th century, and according to the other it was founded by Polish ruler Casimir I the Restorer in 1041. The area formed part of Poland after the establishment of the state in the 10th century. Under the Latinized name of Pecare, the settlement was mentioned in a document by the bishop of Kraków Paweł of Przemankowo from 1277. The name is of Polish origin. It derives from the word piekarz (meaning "baker"), referring to possible bakers baking bread here for the nearby city of Bytom or from the word pieczara (meaning "cavern"), as caverns were supposedly created here as a result of exploitation of ore.

As a result of the 12th-century fragmentation of Poland it was part of various Piast-ruled duchies, the last being the Duchy of Opole until 1526. Between 1303 and 1318, the first church and independent parish were created there. In the 15th century, the zinc and lead mining industry developed and the process of settlement evolution begun.

=== Modern era ===
In 1526 Piekary came under the suzerainty of the Habsburg monarchy. In 1645, along with the Duchy of Opole, Piekary returned to Polish rule under the House of Vasa. Polish King John III Sobieski visited Piekary in 1683, while rushing to the relief of Vienna during the Ottoman invasion. The next years brought several peasant revolts against the German magnates. In 1697, newly elected King of Poland Augustus II the Strong stopped in Piekary before his royal coronation in Kraków. He converted to Catholicism in the local church and at the same time he sworn the pacta conventa. In January 1734, his son, elected king Augustus III of Poland, also stopped here, while heading for his royal coronation, and also swore the pacta conventa here.

In 1742 the settlement was annexed by Prussia and colonisation and Germanisation of Piekary Śląskie increased. The result was a strong movement towards maintaining the Polish origins of the land. In 1842, Piekary's rector, priest Jan Alojzy Ficek, commissioned a new neo-romanesque Basilica of St. Mary and St. Bartholomew designed by Daniel Grötschel. A painting of the Virgin Mary was placed there. In the mid-19th century, Teodor Heneczek founded a Polish printing house. In the late 19th century Polish singing and gymnastic societies, reading rooms and the first patriotic organizations were established. In 1905 the Polish Gymnastic Society "Sokół" was established in Piekary. Tram communication was available from 1894.

=== Recent history ===
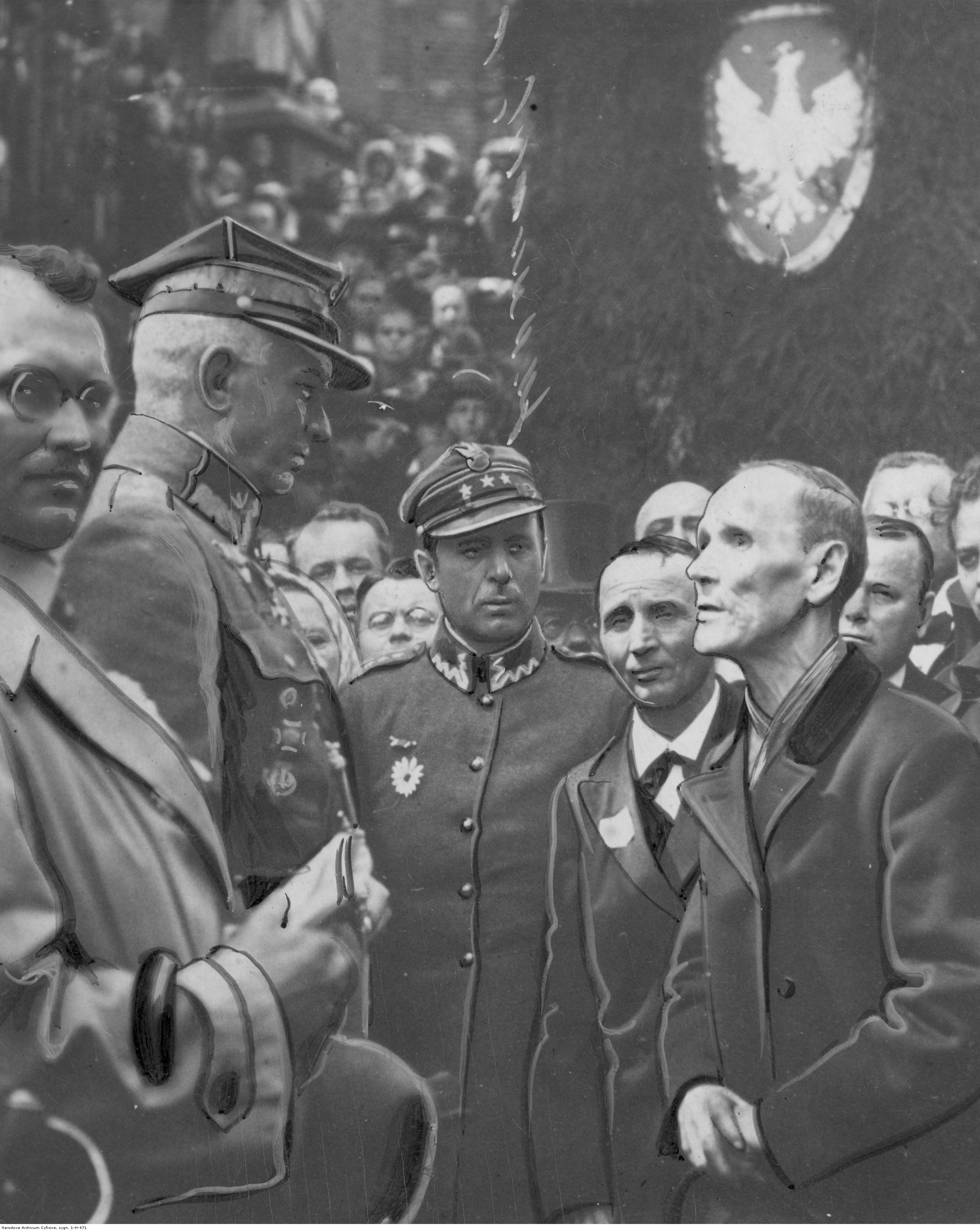
Meeting of Stanisław Szeptycki and Wawrzyniec Hajda in Piekary in 1922

It was one of the centers of Silesian Uprisings and in 1922 was ceded to the Second Polish Republic by Weimar Germany as 86% of the population voted for joining the re-established Polish state. In June 1922, a symbolic ceremony of reintegration of Piekary with Poland took place. Polish Uhlans under the command of Stanisław Szeptycki entered Piekary, greeted by the St. Mary church by the local populace led by Wawrzyniec Hajda, local Polish independence activist and poet, nicknamed the "Silesian Wernyhora". On July 10, 1939, Piekary Śląskie received city rights with effect from 1940. As a result of the outbreak of World War II, the actual implementation of this law did not take place until 1947.

During the joint German-Soviet invasion of Poland, which started World War II, Piekary was captured by Germany in September 1939, and then was under German occupation until 1945. Already in September 1939, the Germans carried out several executions of Poles (see Nazi crimes against the Polish nation). On September 6, Germans murdered three Poles in the present-day district of Brzozowice. On September 17, the Freikorps murdered two miners, one local official and one former Silesian Uprisings participant in Piekary. Several miners from the present-day district of Brzozowice were murdered in nearby Lasowice (present-day district of Tarnowskie Góry). Local teachers were among Polish teachers murdered in Nazi concentration camps. The Polenlager No. 188, a forced labour camp for Poles, was operated in the city. During the occupation, the city's main street, Bytomska, was renamed Adolf Hitler Street (Adolf-Hitler-Straße).

In 1973 Kozłowa Góra was included within the city limits as the northernmost district. Under the administrative reform of 1975, the city limits were expanded by including the surrounding towns and settlements: Dąbrówka Wielka, Brzeziny Śląskie, Brzozowice and Kamień.

== Districts ==
- Kozłowa Góra
- Centrum
- Szarlej
- Brzozowice
- Kamień
- Brzeziny Śląskie
- Dąbrówka Wielka

== Sights ==
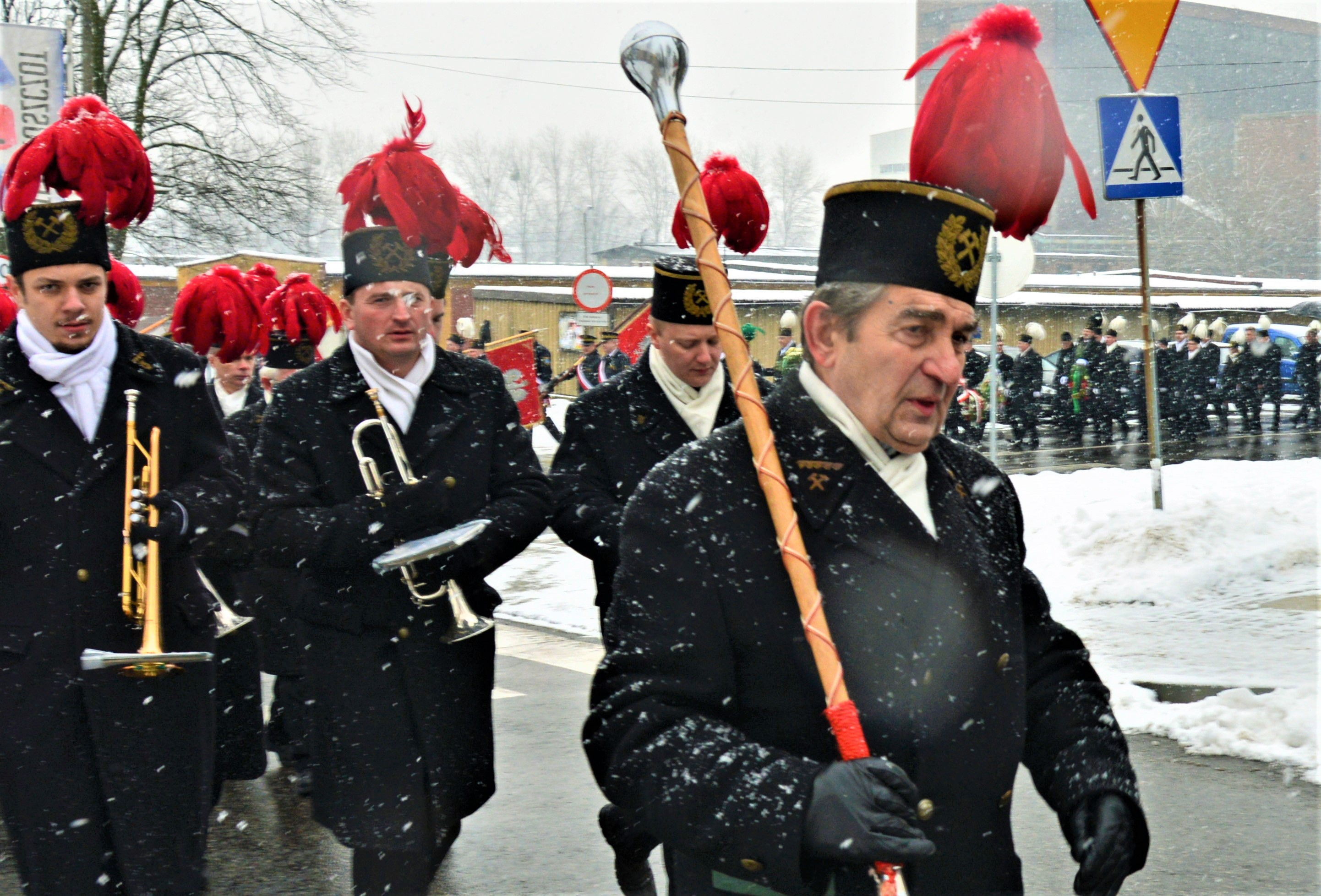
Barbórka parade in Piekary Śląskie

The main landmark of Piekary Śląskie is the Romanesque Revival Basilica of St. Mary and St. Bartholomew, a popular Catholic pilgrimage site. Another symbol of the city is the Liberation Mound, erected in 1932–1937 to commemorate the 250th anniversary of the march of the Polish hussars of King John III Sobieski through Piekary to Vienna and the 15th anniversary of reintegrating eastern Upper Silesia with Poland after the Silesian Uprisings. It is the highest point within the city limits. Also the Piekary Calvary with the Church of the Resurrection of Christ is one of the city's landmarks.

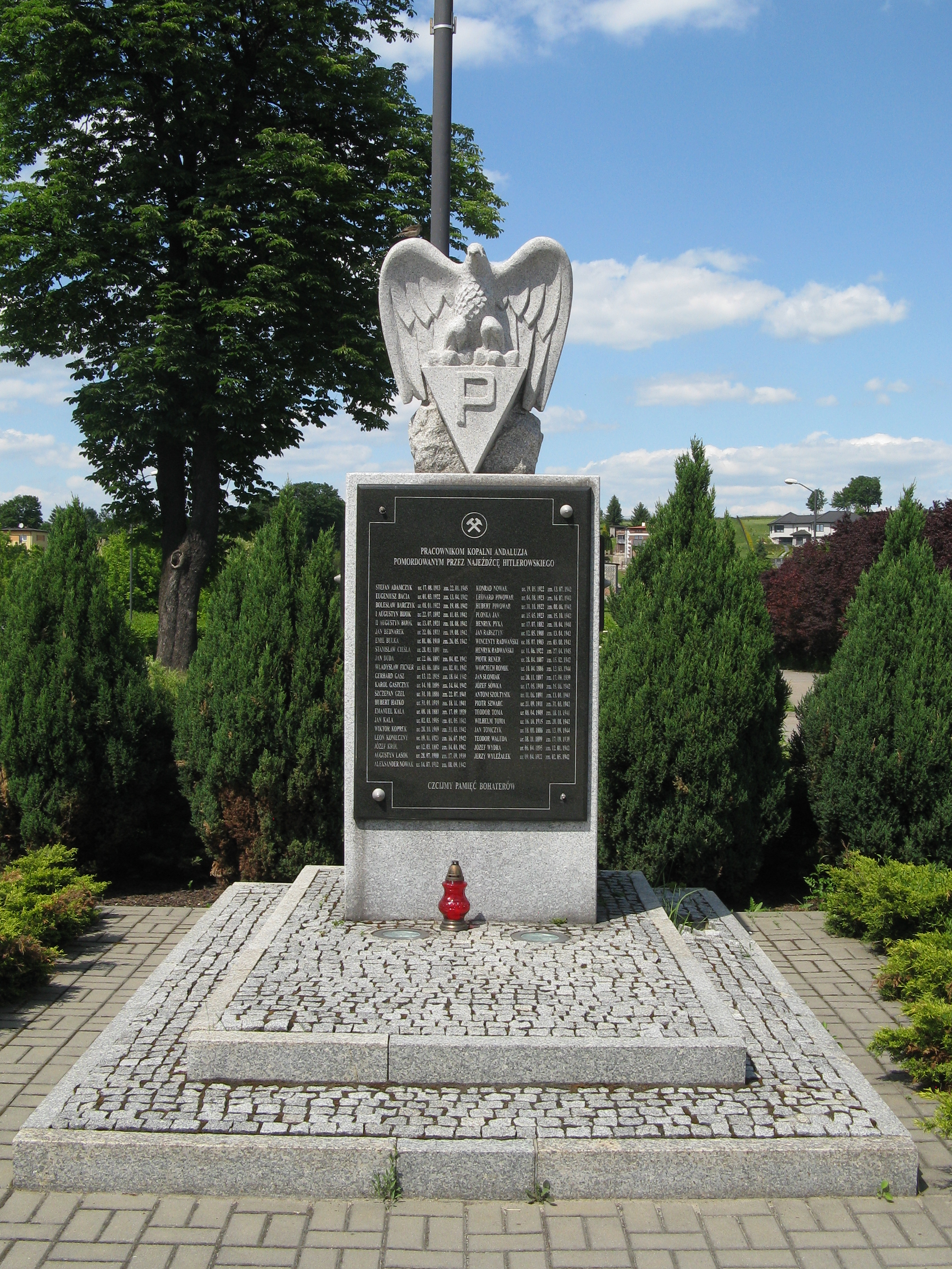
Monument to the miners of the Andaluzja coal mine, murdered by the Germans during World War II

Other historic architecture includes the Sacred Heart church, Saints Peter and Paul church, Our Lady Help of Christians church and the Our Lady of Perpetual Help chapel in Kozłowa Góra, as well as numerous historic townhouses and buildings. In the city there are also monuments commemorating Poles murdered during the German occupation in World War II, and a monument to local Polish independence activist and poet Wawrzyniec Hajda, located in the Szarlej district.

=== Gallery ===
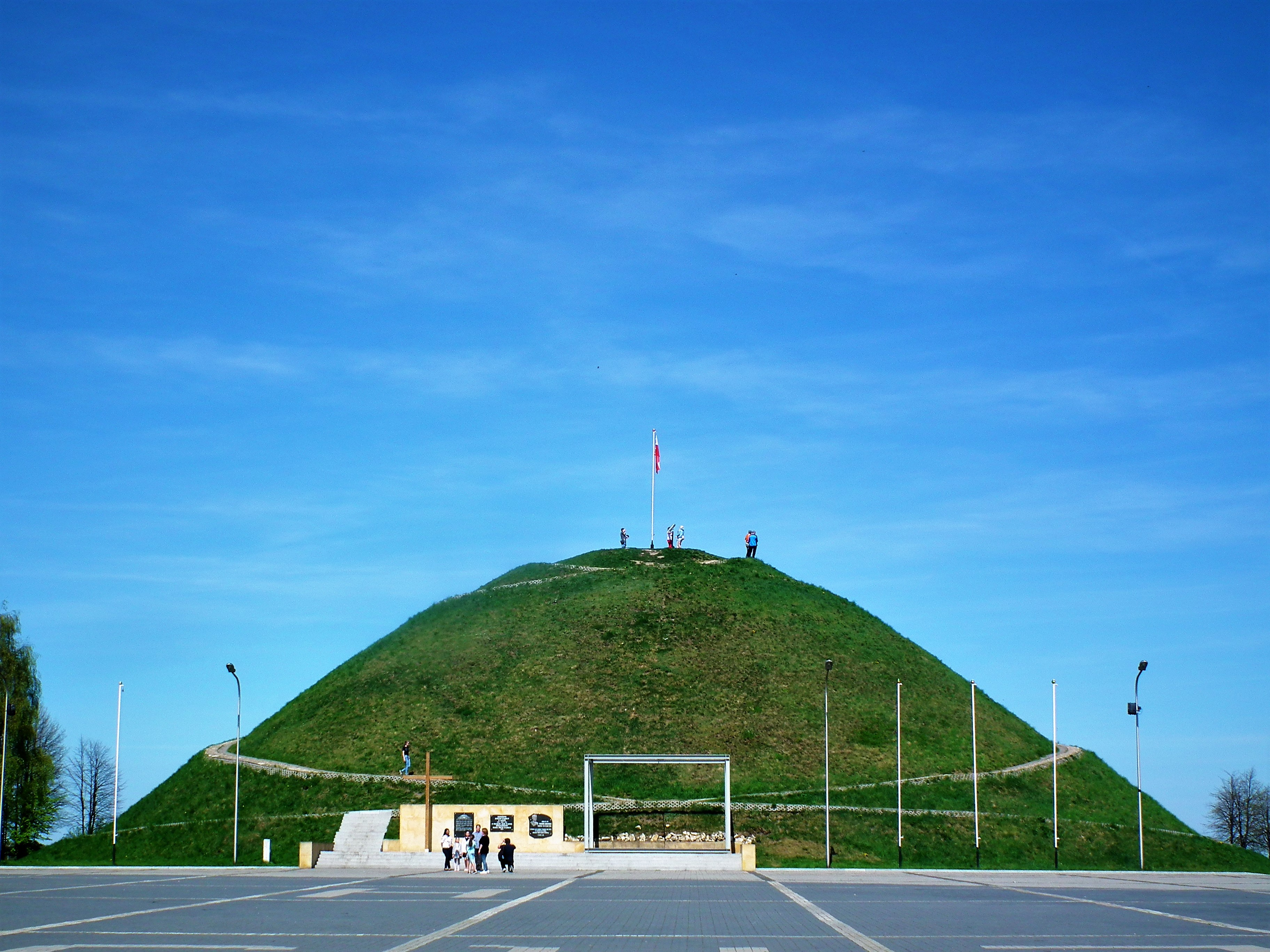
Liberation Mound

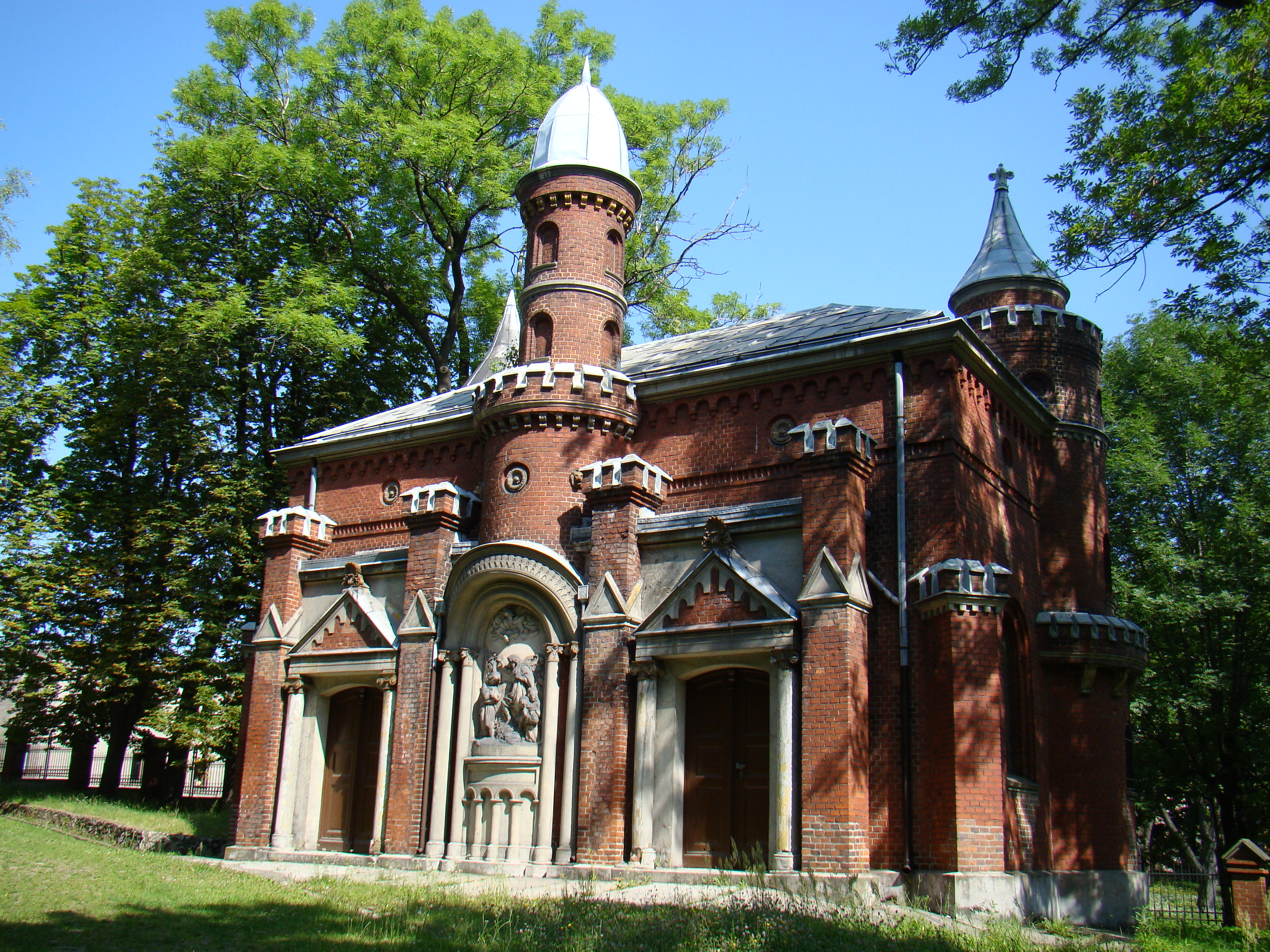
One of the chapels of the Piekary Calvary

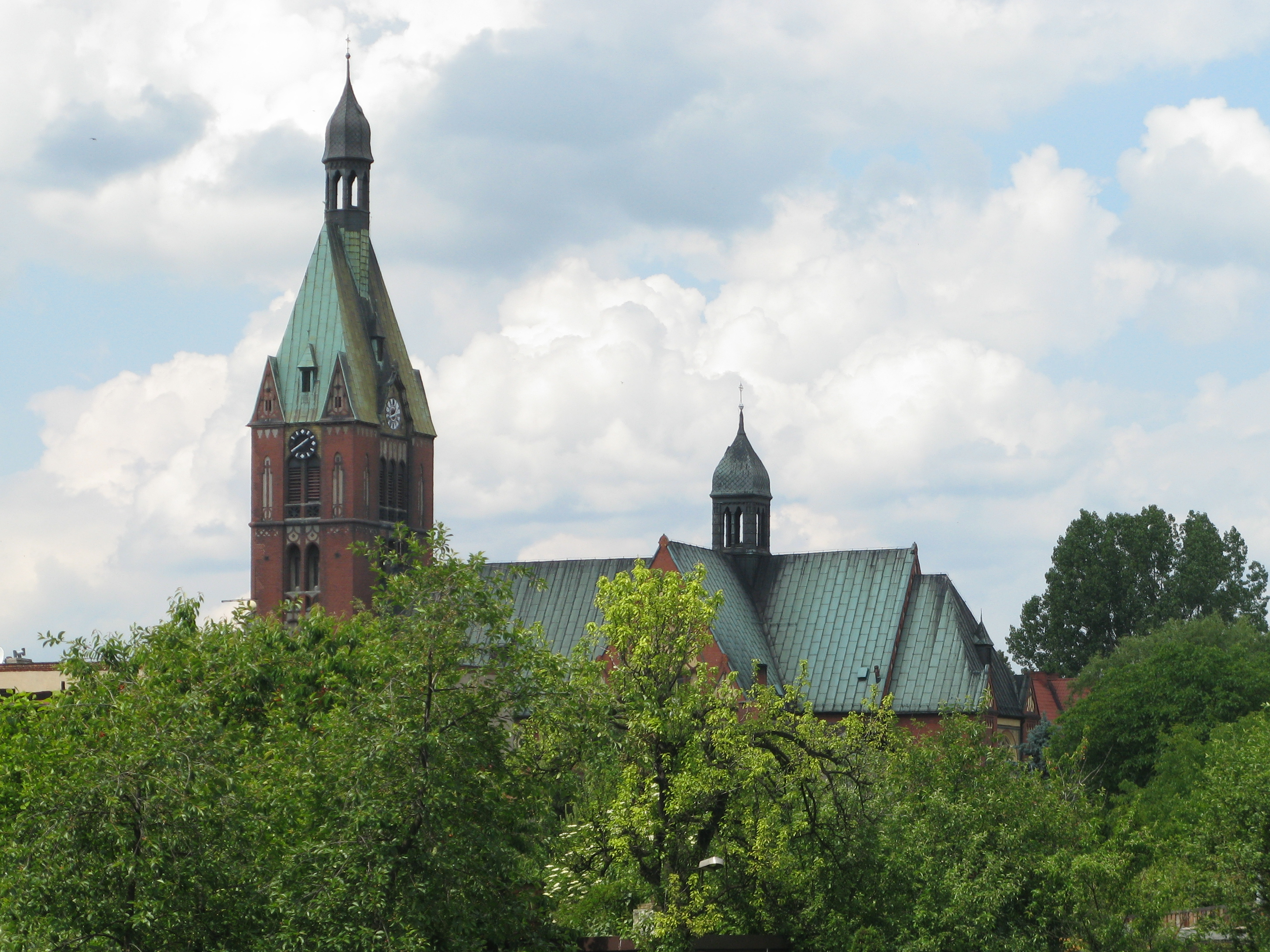
Sacred Heart church

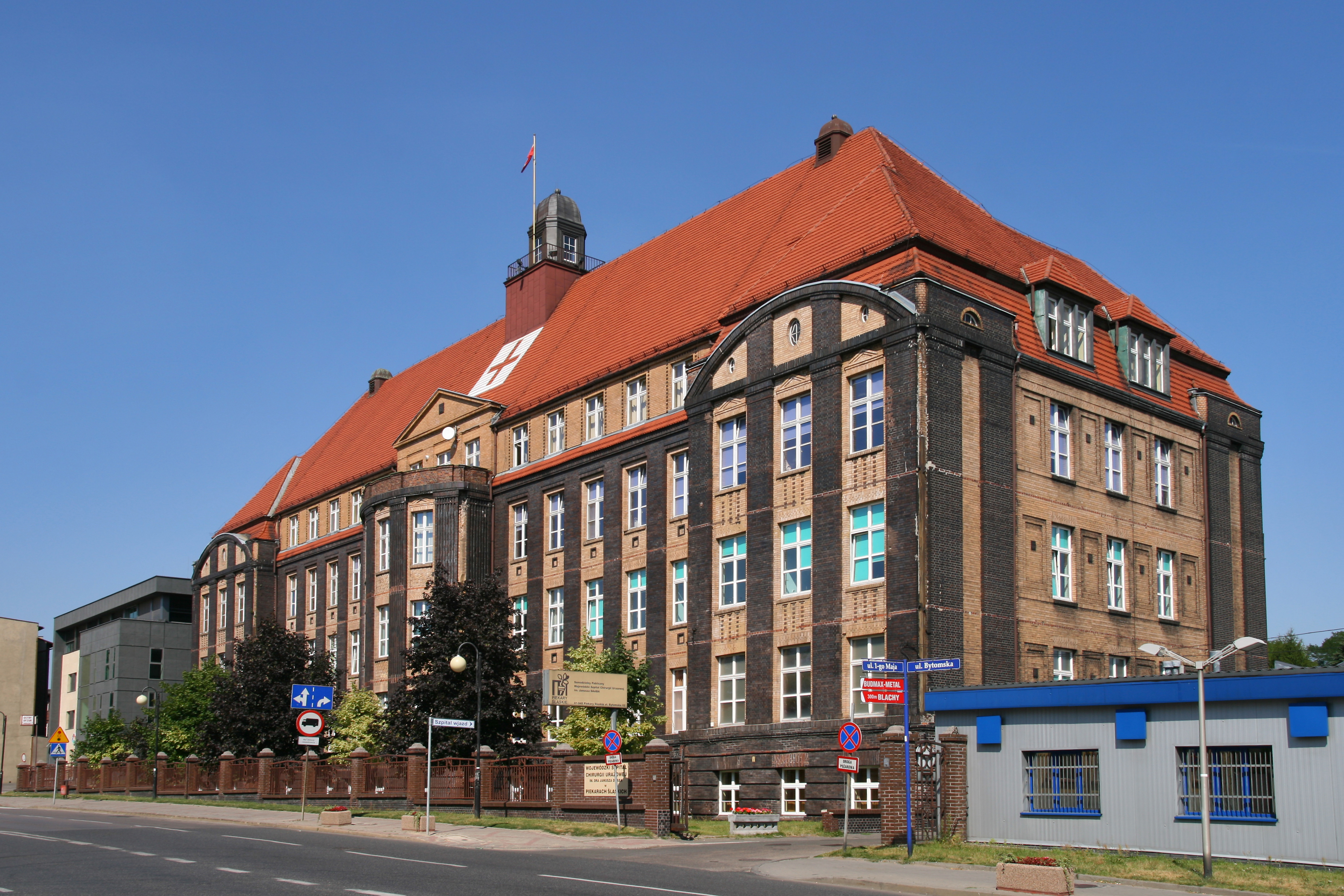
Historic hospital building

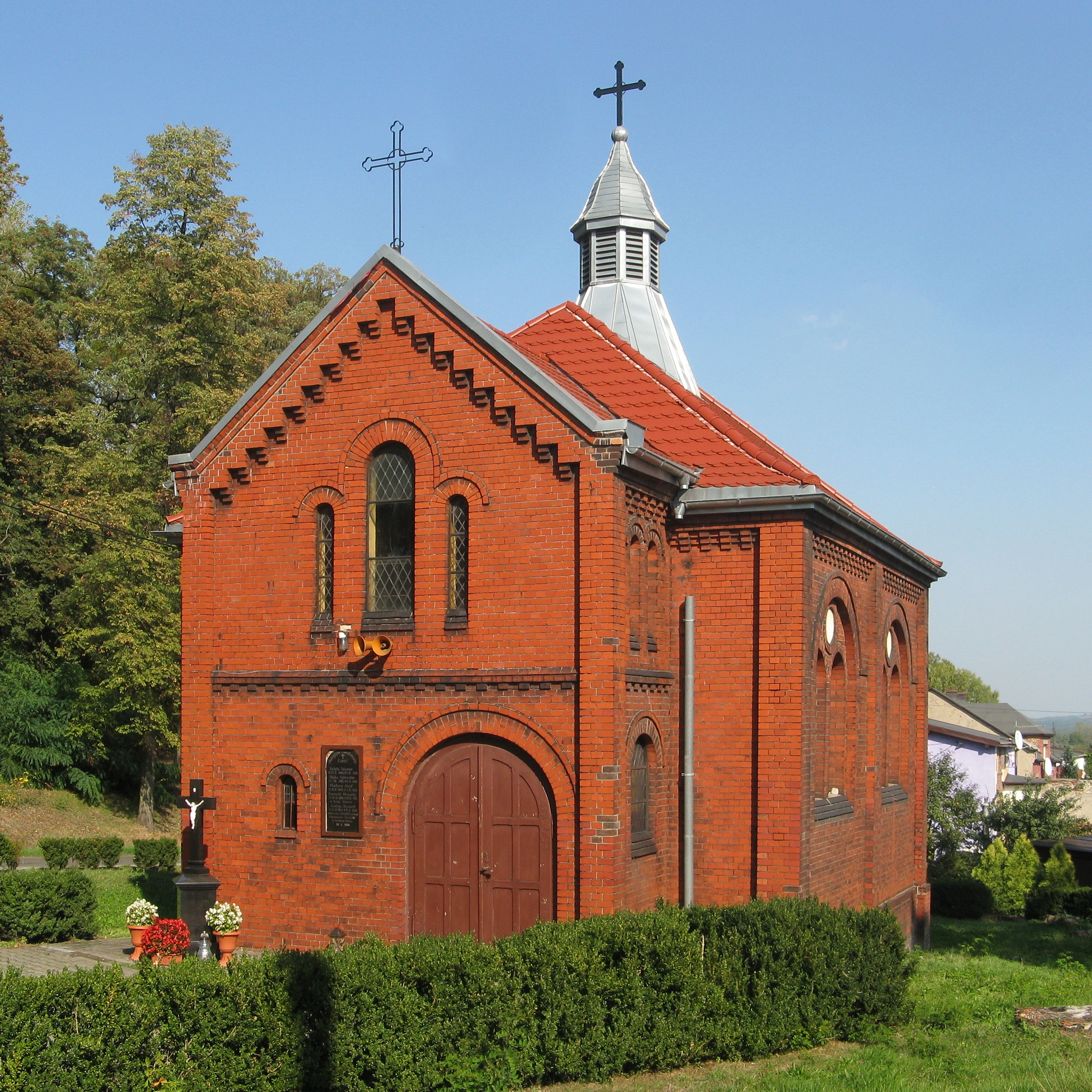
Our Lady of Perpetual Help chapel in Kozłowa Góra

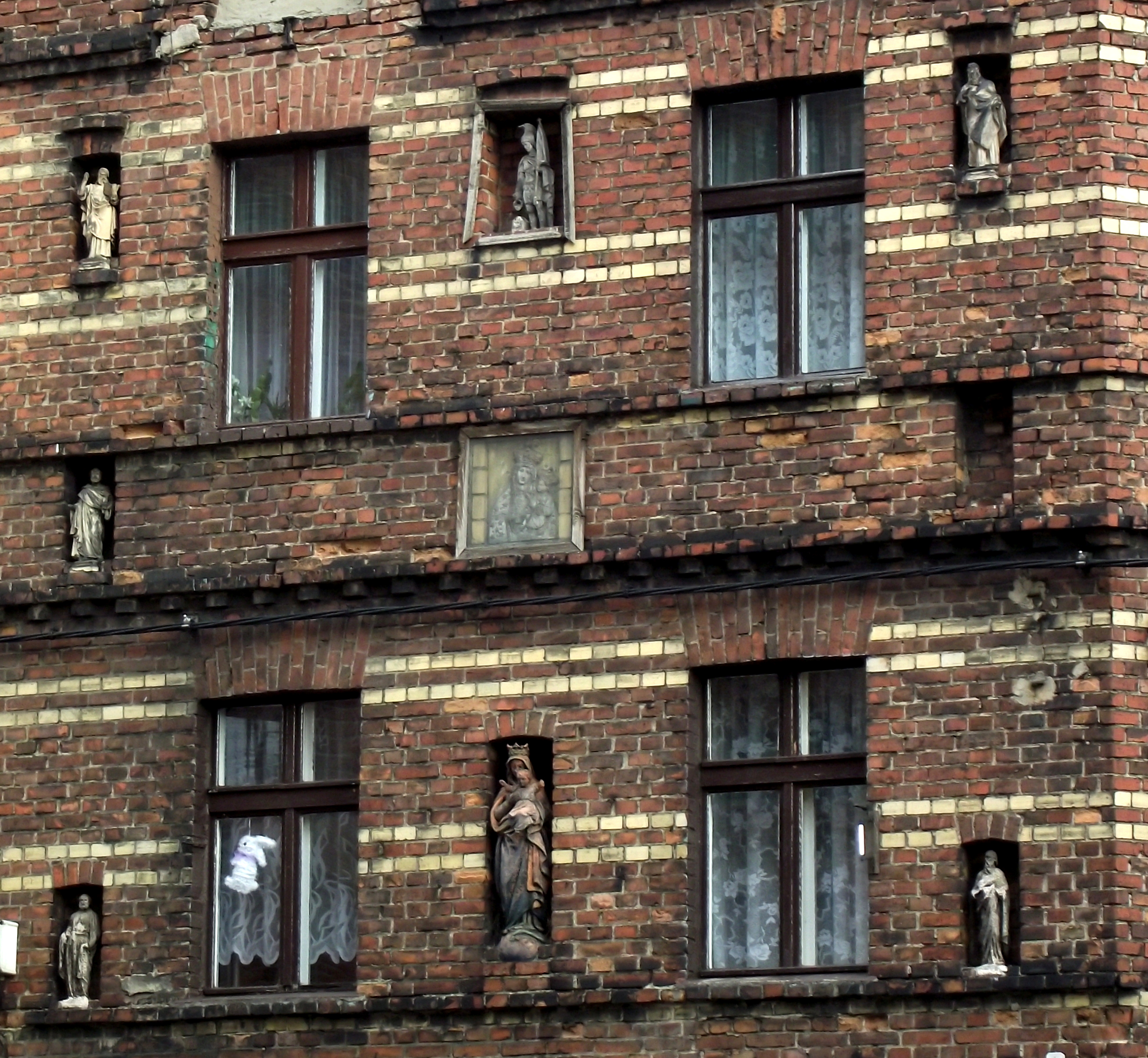
Facade of an old tenement house with figurines of Holy Mary

== Sports ==
The city's most notable sports club is handball team Olimpia Piekary Śląskie, which competes in the I Liga (Polish second tier), but in the past played in the Polish Superliga (top division), where it finished 4th in 2007.

== Notable people ==
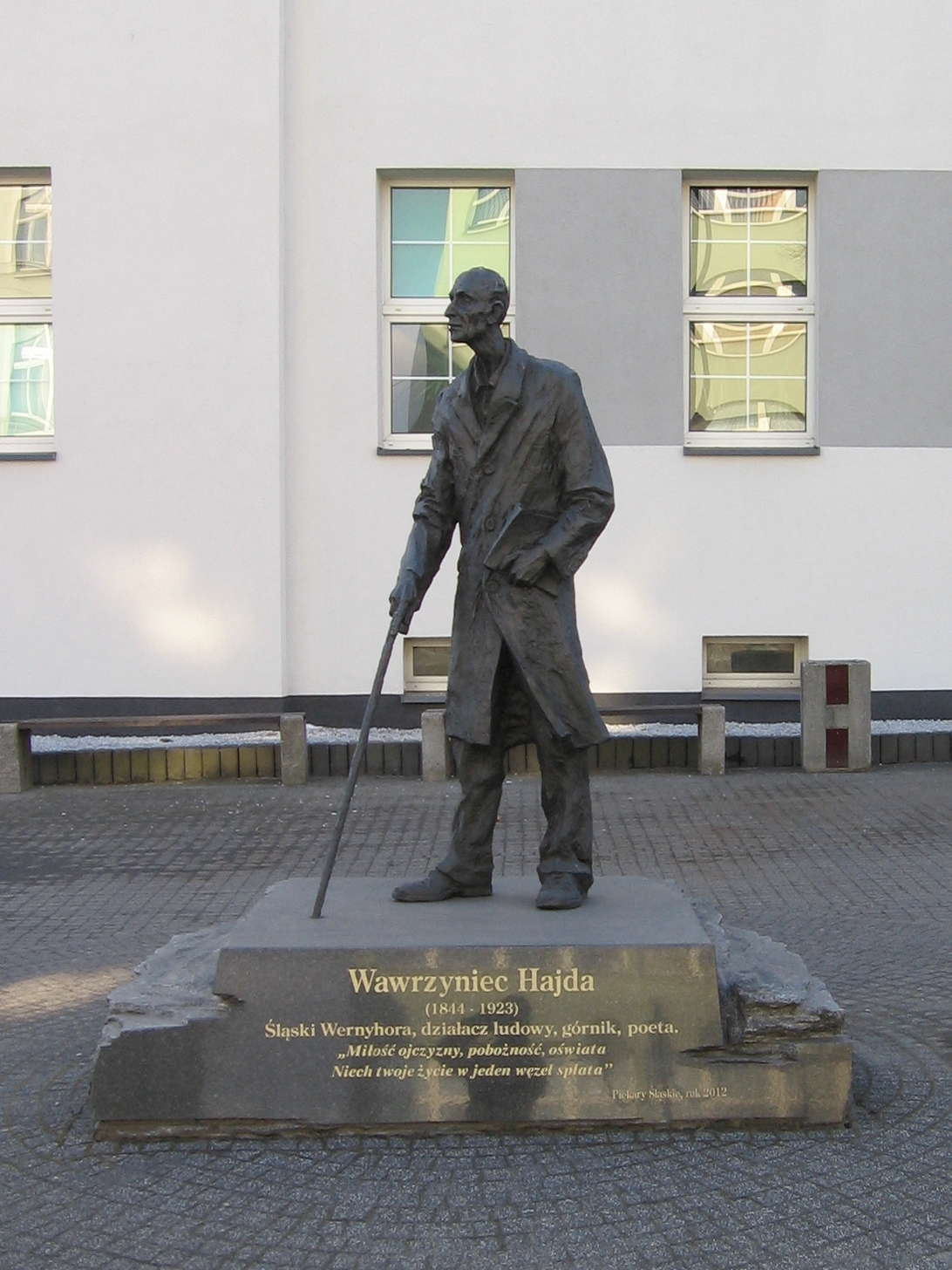
Wawrzyniec Hajda monument

- Karol Langner (1843–1912), Polish priest
- Wawrzyniec Hajda (1844–1923), Polish independence activist and poet
- Hans Marchwitza, born at Szarlej (1890–1965), German writer and Communist
- Hans Kroll (1898–1967), German diplomat
- Wilhelm Antoni Góra (1916–1975), Polish footballer
- Marek Siwiec (born 1955), Polish politician, Member of the European Parliament
- Jerzy Polaczek (born 1961), Polish politician
- Adam Matysek (born 1968), Polish footballer
- Dariusz Wosz (born 1969), German footballer

== Twin towns – sister cities ==
Piekary Śląskie is twinned with:

- (Georgia (country)) Kobuleti, Georgia
- Kroměříž, Czech Republic
- Marija Bistrica, Croatia
