= Demographics of Germany =

- Population pyramid in 2025
- Population: ▼83,467,117 (31 December 2025)
- Density: ▼241/km^{2} (620/sq mi) (2024)
- Growth rate: ▼ −0.12% (2024)
- Birth rate: ▼8.2 births/1,000 population (2023)
- Death rate: ▼12.2 deaths/1,000 population (2023)
- Life expectancy: ▲81.2 years (2018–2020)
  - male: ▲78.64 years
  - female: ▲83.40 years
- Fertility rate: ▼1.28 children born/woman (2026)
- Infant mortality: ▼3.15 deaths/1,000 live births (2023)
- Net migration rate: ▲1.8 migrant(s)/1,000 population (2024)
- Immigrant share: 19.8% (2024)

Sex ratio
- Total: 0.97 male(s)/female (2015)
- At birth: 1.06 male(s)/female
- Under 15: 1.05 male(s)/female
- 15–64 years: 1.02 male(s)/female
- 65 and over: 0.76 male(s)/female

Nationality
- Nationality: noun: German(s) adjective: German
- Major ethnic: Germans (72.65%); European ethnic groups in total (including Germans and European minority groups) (86.03%-93.02%)
- Minor ethnic: Minor ethnic groups; Turks (3.62%); Poles (2.65%); Russians (1.60%); Kazakh (1.58%); Syrians (1.46%); Ukrainians (1.44%); Romanians (1.33%); Italians (1.02%); Kosovars (0.70%); Bosnians (0.66%); Afghans (0.56%); Greeks (0.51%); Iraqis (0.45%); Bulgarians (0.44%); Croats (0.44%); Serbians (0.43%); Austrians (0.41%); Iranians (0.38%); Indians (0.36%); Moroccans (0.34%); Egyptians, Algerians, Libyans, Tunisians (0.34%); Hungarians (0.32%); Chinese (0.28%); Macedonians (0.28%); Spaniards (0.28%); Americans (0.27%); Vietnamese (0.27%); French (0.26%); Czechs (0.25%); Dutch (0.25%); Moldovans (0.23%); Lebanese (0.22%); British (0.21%); Portuguese (0.20%); Pakistanis (0.19%); Brazilians (0.15%); Thais (0.13%)

Language
- Official: German (81.42%)
- Spoken: Minor languages; Turkish (2.53%); Russian (2.26%); Arabic (1.74%); Polish (1.22%); English (1.20%); Serbo-Croatian (1.13%); Romanian (0.91%); Ukrainian (0.72%); Bulgarian (0.71%); Kurdish (0.68%); Italian (0.64%); Others (5.94%)

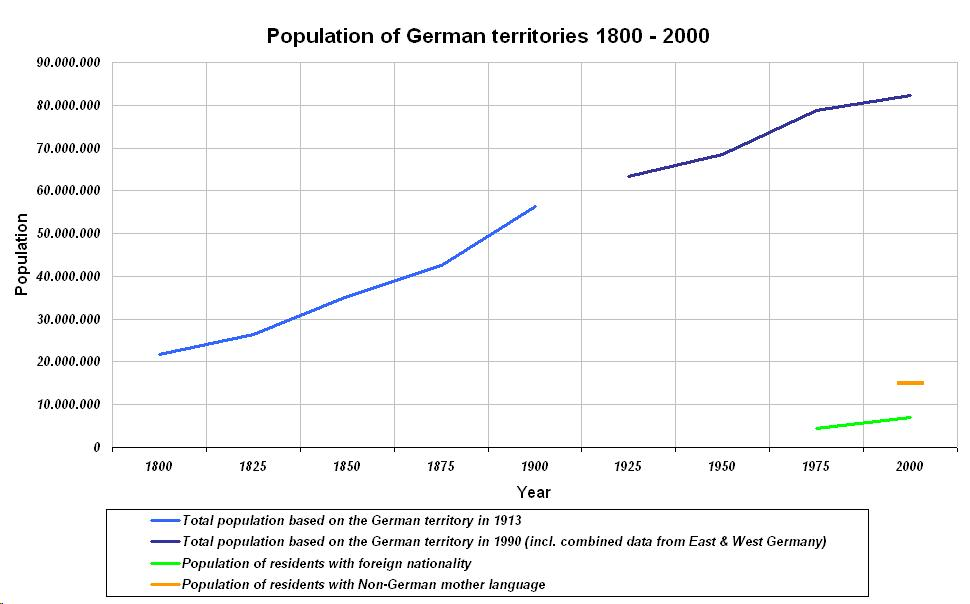
Population between 1800 and 2000

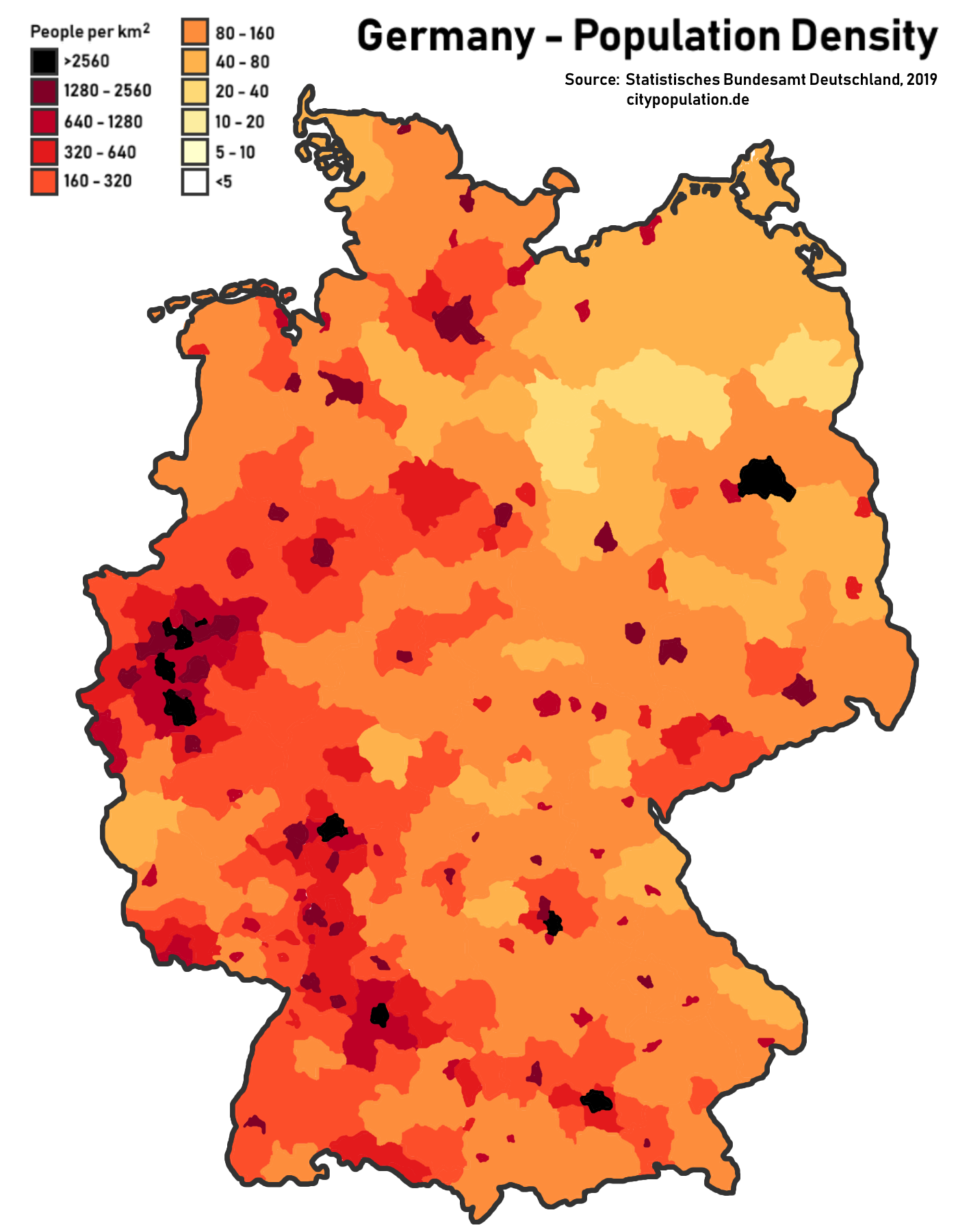
Population density in Germany, by kreis/district

Population density in 1925

Historical population
Year	Pop.	±% p.a.
1500	9,200,000	—
1550	12,900,000	+0.68%
1600	16,200,000	+0.46%
1650	10,000,000	−0.96%
1700	14,100,000	+0.69%
1750	18,300,000	+0.52%
1800	22,700,000	+0.43%
1850	35,303,000	+0.89%
1870	40,804,000	+0.73%
1900	56,046,000	+1.06%
1910	64,568,000	+1.43%
1920	61,974,000	−0.41%
1930	64,294,000	+0.37%
1940	69,838,000	+0.83%
1950	69,346,000	−0.07%
1960	73,147,000	+0.54%
1970	78,069,000	+0.65%
1980	78,397,000	+0.04%
1990	79,753,227	+0.17%
2000	82,259,540	+0.31%
2010	81,751,602	−0.06%
2020	83,155,031	+0.17%
2025	83,467,117	+0.07%
Source: DESTATIS (after 1950), Histat (1850−1940 Reich Boundaries), Max Planck Society (1500−1840 Reich Boundaries (incl .Als.-Lor.))

The demography of Germany is monitored by the Statistisches Bundesamt (Federal Statistical Office of Germany). According to the most recent data, Germany's population is 83,467,117 (31 December 2025) making it the most populous country in the European Union and the nineteenth-most populous country in the world. The total fertility rate was rated at 1.32 in 2025, significantly below the replacement rate of 2.1. Germany has had one of the world's lowest fertility rates of around 1.3 to 1.4 since the 1980s. Due to a low birth rate, Germany has recorded more deaths than births every year since 1972, which means 2025 was the 54th consecutive year the German population would have decreased without immigration. However, due to immigration the population actually increased by around five million people over the last half-century. In 2025, the number of people with a foreign background was about 31%; this category includes foreigners, naturalized citizens, ethnic German repatriates from Eastern Europe and the children of all of the above.

Until the early 20th century Germany was also a large emigrant nation; in the 19th century more than 5 million citizens of the German Empire emigrated to the US alone, and in the early 20th century Germany lost another two million to the US as well as significant numbers to Latin America, Canada and Eastern Europe. However, after World War II immigration began to outweigh emigration, as around 14 million ethnic Germans were expelled from the former eastern provinces of the Reich and other areas in Eastern Europe. Of these, roughly 12 million made their way to present-day Germany and several hundred thousand settled in Austria and other countries, while several hundred thousand died. Some additional 4.5 million ethnic Germans from Eastern Europe repatriated after 1950, especially around the end of the Eastern Bloc and mostly from the former Soviet Union, Poland and Romania.

Large-scale immigration to West Germany began during the time of the Wirtschaftswunder from the 1950s to early 1970s when Germany had a shortage of workers and let in people from countries like Turkey, Italy and Spain on a temporary basis as guest workers. The liberalisation of guest worker legislation allowed many to stay and build a life in West Germany. Germany saw another large wave of immigration towards the end of the 20th century, driven by German reunification, refugee inflows from the Yugoslav Wars and large numbers of Turkish nationals seeking asylum. The next large immigration wave began after eastern expansion of the European Union in 2011 as Eastern Europeans were now allowed to live and work in Germany without a visa. During the European migrant crisis of 2015 Germany took in a large number of refugees, both in absolute terms and relative to other EU member states; the country recorded 476,649 asylum seekers in 2015, 745,545 in 2016 and declining numbers thereafter.

Germany has one of the world's highest levels of education, technological development, and economic productivity. Since the end of World War II, the number of students entering university has more than tripled, and the trade and technical schools are among the world's best. With a per capita income of about €40,883 in 2018, Germany is a broadly middle-class society. However, there has been a strong increase in the number of children living in poverty. In 1965, one in 75 children was on the welfare rolls; but by 2007 this had increased to one child in six. These children live in relative poverty, but not necessarily in absolute poverty. Millions of Germans travel overseas each year. The social welfare system provides for universal health care, unemployment compensation, child benefits and other social programmes. Germany's aging population and struggling economy strained the welfare system in the 1990s, resulting in the government adopting a wide-ranging programme of controversial belt-tightening reforms, Agenda 2010, including the labour-market reforms known as Hartz concept.

== History ==
=== 1945–1990 ===
Population evolution of Germany, since 1950

After the World War II border shifts and expulsions, the Germans from Central and Eastern Europe and the former eastern territories moved westward to post-war Germany. During the partition of Germany, many Germans from East Germany fled to West Germany for political and economic reasons. Since Germany's reunification, there are ongoing migrations from the eastern New Länder to the western Old Länder for economic reasons.

The Federal Republic of Germany and the German Democratic Republic followed different paths when it came to demographics. The politics of the German Democratic Republic was pronatalistic while that of the Federal Republic was compensatory.

Fertility in the GDR was higher than that in the FRG. Demographic politics was only one of the reasons. Women in the GDR had fewer "biographic options". Young motherhood was expected of them. State funded cost-free childcare was available to all mothers.

Mother's mean age at first birth in East and West Germany
Year	1960	1970	1980	1985	2002	2008
West Germany	24.9	23.8	25.0	26.2	27.6	28.7
East Germany	23.0	22.5	22.3	22.3	26.4	27.5

Note: Berlin is included into East Germany for the year 2002 and 2008. Source: Kreyenfeld (2002); Kreyenfeld et al. (2010); HFD Germany (2010)

=== 1990–today ===
About 1.7 million people have left the new federal states (the East) since the fall of the Berlin Wall, or 12% of the population; a disproportionately high number of them were women under 35.

After 1990, the total fertility rate (TFR) in the East dropped to 0.772 in 1994. This has been attributed to a "demographic shock": people not only had fewer children, they were also less likely to marry or divorce after the end of the GDR; the biographic options of the citizens of the former GDR had increased. Young motherhood seemed to be less attractive and the age of the first birth rose sharply.

In the following years, the TFR in the East started to rise again, surpassing 1.0 in 1997 and 1.3 in 2004, and reaching the West's TFR (1.37) in 2007. In 2010, the East's fertility rate (1.459) clearly exceeded that of the West (1.385), while Germany's overall TFR had risen to 1.393, the highest value since 1990, which was still far below the natural replacement rate of 2.1 and the birth rates seen under communism. In 2016, the TFR was 1.64 in the East and 1.60 in the West.

Between 1989 and 2009, about 2,000 schools closed because there were fewer children.

In some regions the number of women between the ages of 20 and 30 has dropped by more than 30%. In 2004, in the age group 18–29 (statistically important for starting families) there were only 90 women for every 100 men in the new federal states (the East, including Berlin).

Until 2007 family politics in the federal republic was compensatory, which means that poor families received more family benefits (such as the Erziehungsgeld) than rich ones. In 2007 the so-called Elterngeld was introduced. According to Christoph Butterwegge the Elterngeld was meant to "motivate highly educated women to have more children"; the poor on the other hand were disadvantaged by the Elterngeld, and now received lower child benefits than the middle classes. The very well-off (who earn more than 250.000 Euro per annum) and those on welfare receive no Elterngeld payments.

In 2013 the following most recent developments were noticed:

- The income of families with young children has risen. Persons holding a college degree, persons older than 30 years and parents with only one child benefited the most. Single parents and young parents did not benefit.
- Fathers are becoming more involved in parenting, and 28% of them now take some time off work (3.3 months on average) when their children are born.
- Mothers are more likely to work and as a result less likely to be economically deprived than they used to be.
- The birth rate of college-educated women has risen.

In the new federal states the fertility rate of college-educated women is now higher than that of those without college degrees. Differences in value priorities and the better availability of childcare in the eastern states are discussed as possible reasons.

In 2019, the non-profit Austrian Institute of Economic Research and the Bertelsmann Stiftung published a study about the economic impact of demographics. The researchers assume a reduction in the per capita income of €3,700 until 2040.

== Population ==
Historical population of Germany

The contemporary demographics of Germany used to also be measured by a series of full censuses mandated by the state, with the most recent held in 1987. Since reunification, German authorities rely on a micro census. Demographic statistics according to the World Population Review. Due to the privacy concerns of the German population after reunification, Germany did not hold a regular census until the EU-mandated 2011 German Census. The requirement was met with large disapproval. As required by the EU, Germany now continues to hold censuses every 10 years.

- One birth every 43 seconds
- One death every 34 seconds
- Net gain of one person every 4 minutes
- One net migrant every 2 minutes
View source data.
View source data.
View source data.
View source data.

=== Fertility ===
Fertility rate in Germany by district, average of 2017–2019

The total fertility rate is the number of children born per woman. It is based on fairly good data for the entire period. Sources: Our World In Data and Gapminder Foundation.

Total fertility rate in Germany for 19th century
Year	Fertility
1800	5.4
1801	5.40
1802	5.39
1803	5.39
1804	5.38
1805	5.38
1806	5.37
1807	5.37
1808	5.36
1809	5.36
1810	5.35
1811	5.35
1812	5.34
1813	5.34
1814	5.33
1815	5.33
1816	5.32
1817	5.32
1818	5.33
1819	5.35
1820	5.37
1821	5.35
1822	5.33
1823	5.31
1824	5.28
1825	5.26
1826	5.17
1827	5.07
1828	4.97
1829	4.88
1830	4.78
1831	4.80
1832	4.83
1833	4.85
1834	4.88
1835	4.9
1836	4.9
1837	4.9
1838	4.9
1839	4.9
1840	4.9
1841	4.9
1842	4.95
1843	4.97
1844	5.00
1845	5.02
1846	5.02
1847	5.02
1848	5.01
1849	5.01
1850	5.01
1851	4.87
1852	4.74
1853	4.60
1854	4.47
1855	4.33
1856	4.45
1857	4.56
1858	4.67
1859	4.79
1860	4.90
1861	4.93
1862	4.96
1863	5.00
1864	5.03
1865	5.06
1866	5.09
1867	5.11
1868	5.13
1869	5.16
1870	5.18
1871	5.24
1872	5.30
1873	5.35
1874	5.41
1875	5.46
1876	5.38
1877	5.30
1878	5.22
1879	5.14
1880	5.06
1881	5.14
1882	5.21
1883	5.29
1884	5.28
1885	5.26
1886	5.25
1887	5.23
1888	5.22
1889	5.21
1890	5.20
1891	5.18
1892	5.17
1893	5.16
1894	5.14
1895	5.11
1896	5.09
1897	5.06
1898	5.04
1899	4.99

=== Life expectancy ===
Sources: Our World In Data and the United Nations.

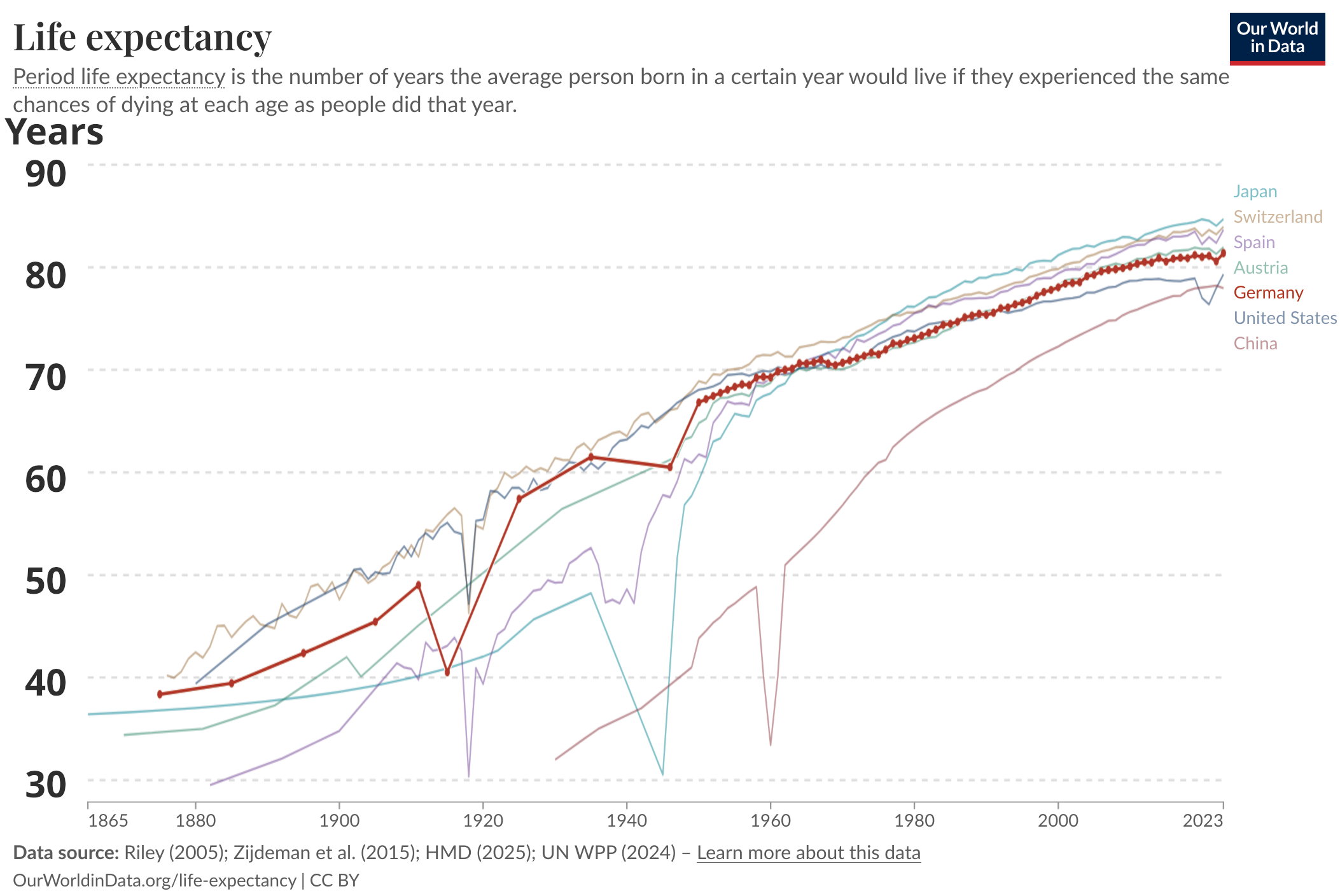
Average lifespan at birth since 1875 with other countries of the D-A-CH countries and USA, China, Spain and Japan for comparison

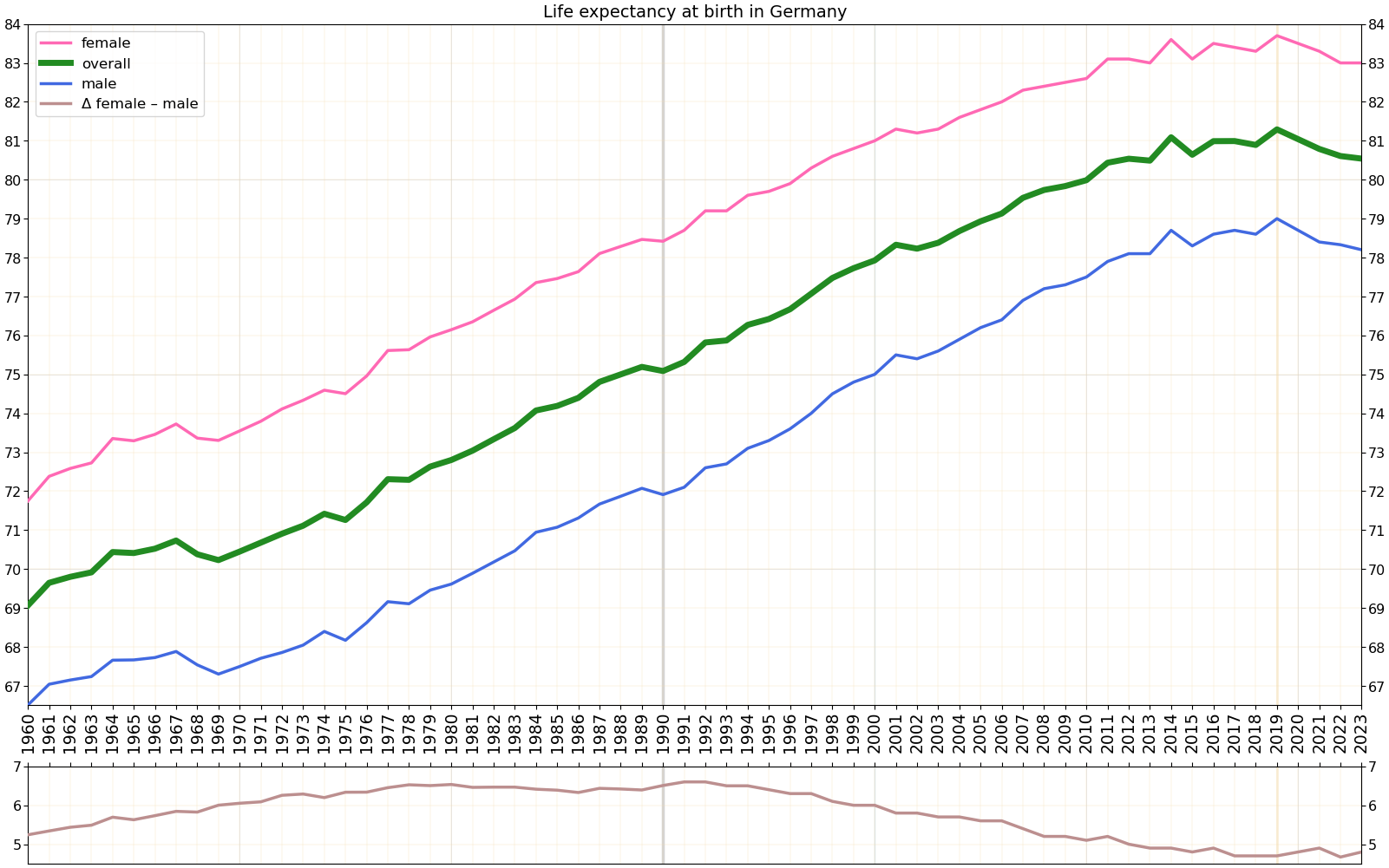
Life expectancy in Germany since 1960 by gender

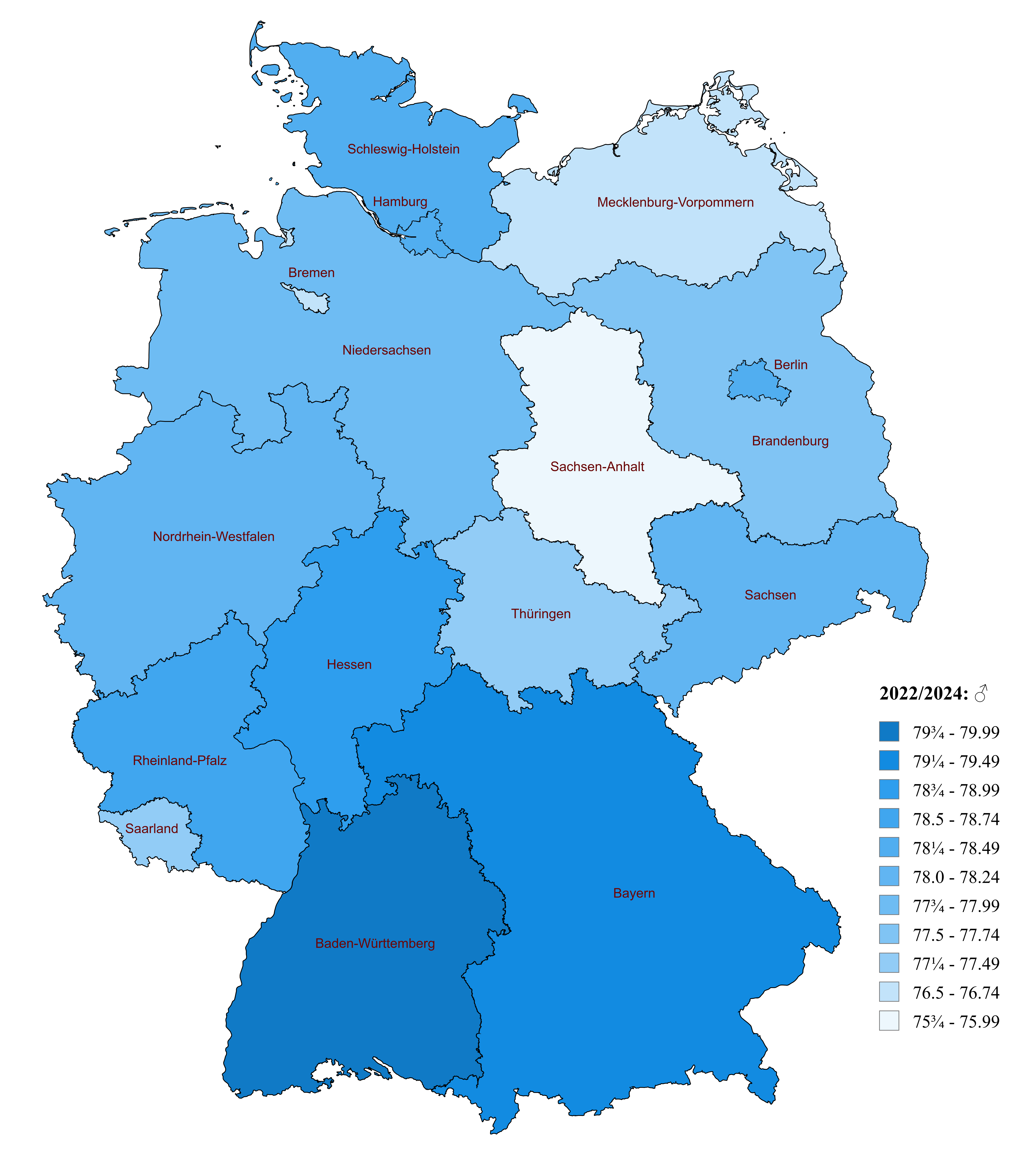
Average life expectancy in 2022–2024 period for male

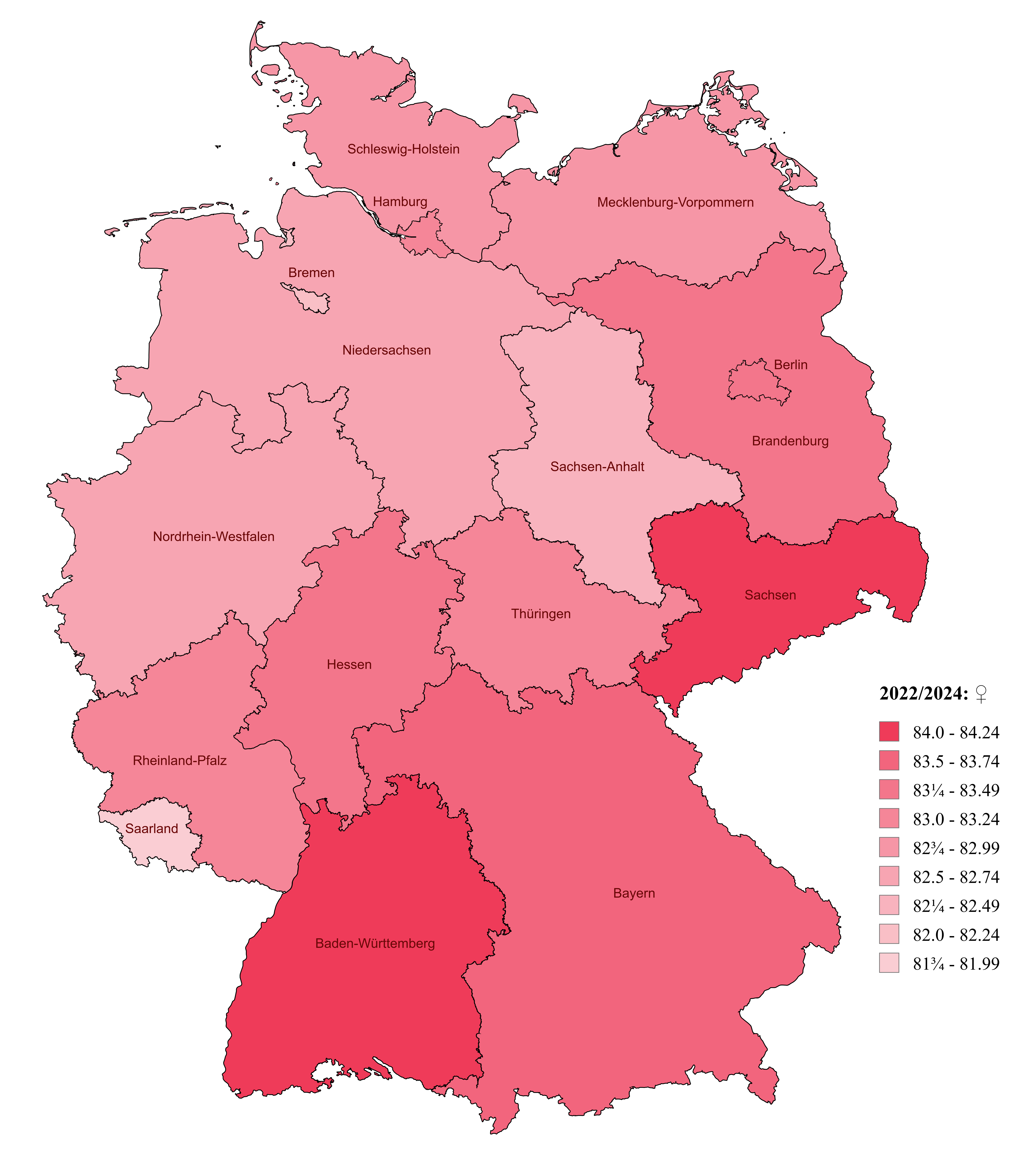
Average life expectancy in 2022-2024 period for female

Life expectancy in years for Germany, 1875–1950, for selected years
Year	Life expectancy
1875	38.5
1885	39.5
1895	42.8
1905	45.5
1911	49.0
1915	40.5
1925	57.4
1935	61.5
1946	60.5

Life expectancy in years for Germany, 1950–2015, by five-year period
Period	Life expectancy
1950–1955	67.5
1955–1960	68.9
1960–1965	70.0
1965–1970	70.7
1970–1975	71.2
1975–1980	72.3
2010–2015	80.4
1980–1985	73.7
1985–1990	75.0
1990–1995	76.0
2000–2005	78.6
2005–2010	79.7
2010–2015	80.4
2015–2020	81.1
2015–2020	81.1
2020–2025	80.9

Source: UN World Population Prospects (until 2020), Destatis (from 2020).

Life expectancy at birth

Total population
80.8 years
Male
78.5 years
Female
83.3 years (2017 est.)
Country comparison to the world
34th

=== Age structure ===
0–14 years
12.83% (male 5,299,798 /female 5,024,184)
15–24 years
9.98% (male 4,092,901 /female 3,933,997)
25–54 years
39.87% (male 16,181,931 /female 15,896,528)
55–64 years
14.96% (male 5,989,111 /female 6,047,449)
65 years and over
22.36% (male 7,930,590 /female 10,061,248) (2018 est.)

Median age:

Total
47.4 years
Male
46.2 years
Female
48.5 years (2018 est.)
Country comparison to the world
3rd

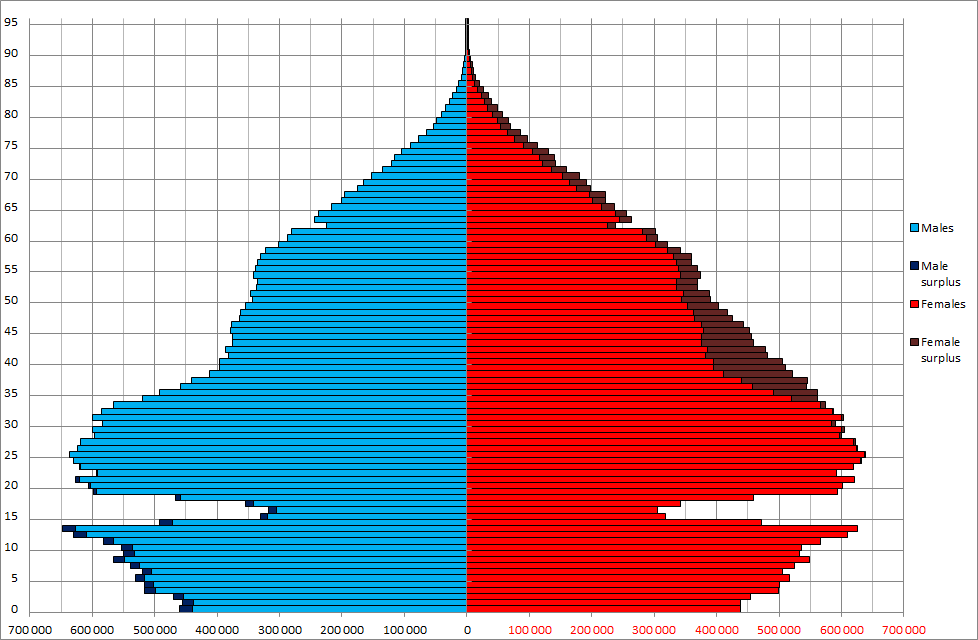
Population pyramid in 1933

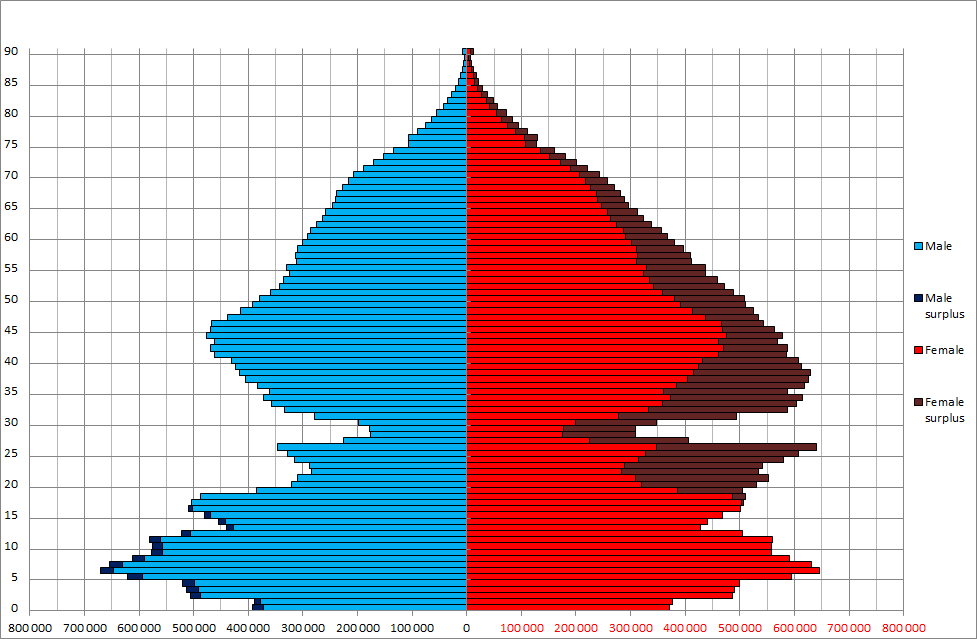
Population pyramid in 1946

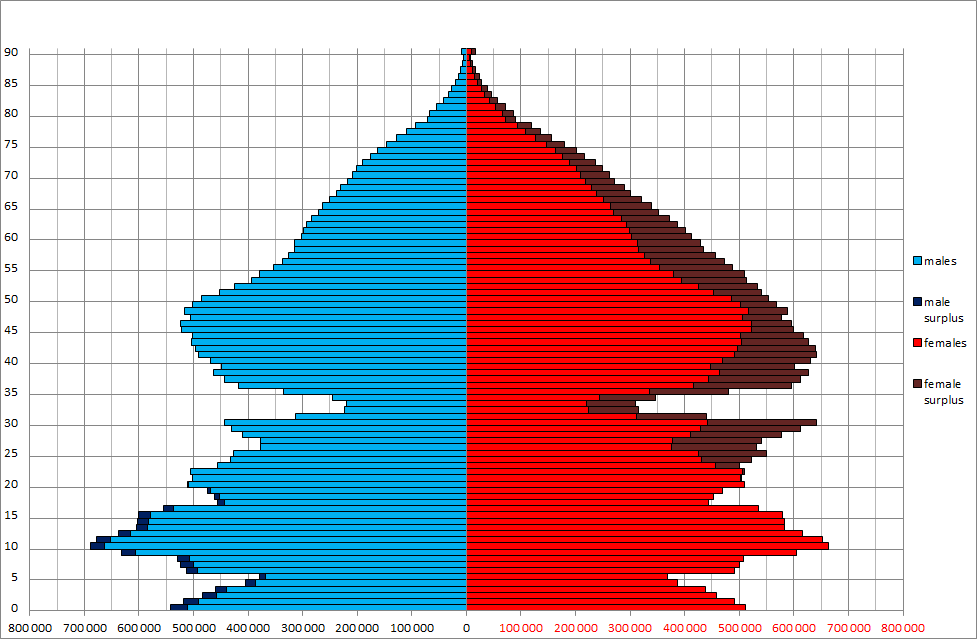
Population pyramid in 1950

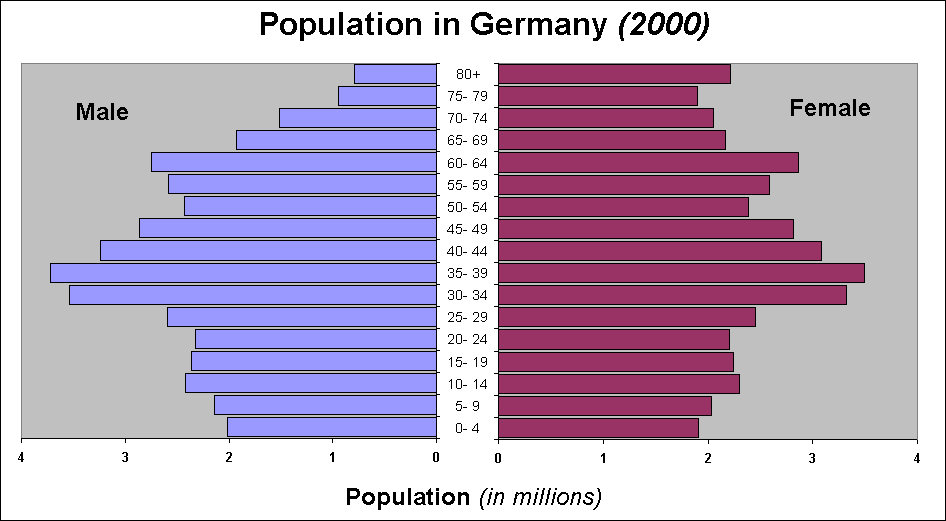
Population pyramid in 2000

Animated population pyramid

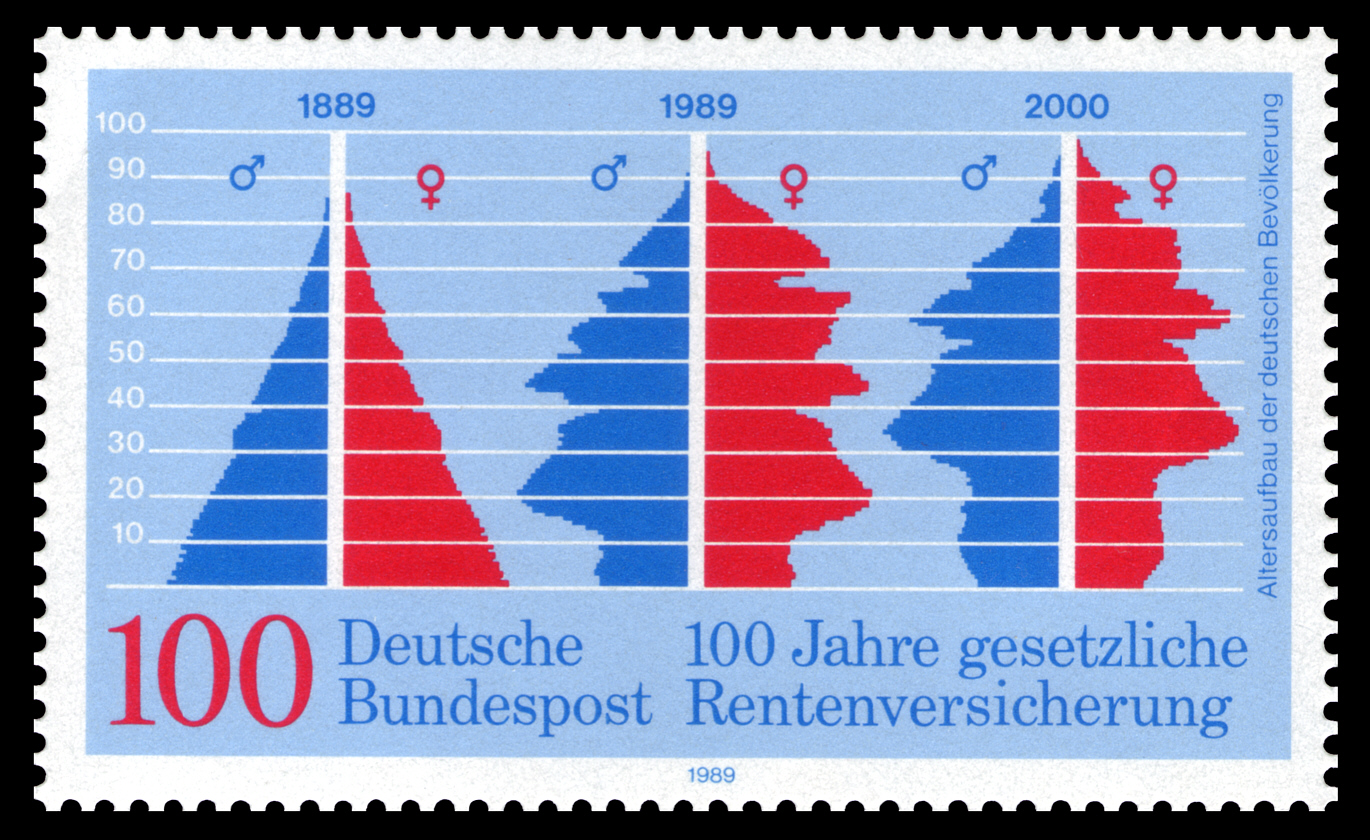
Three population pyramids of Germany: in 1889, 1989, and 2000

== Vital statistics ==
=== Statistics since 1817 ===
Population statistics since 1817. Territorial changes of Germany occurred in 1866 (establishment of North German Confederation), 1871 (German unification and annexation of Alsace-Lorraine), 1918/1919, 1921/1922, 1945/1946 and in 1990. Death data may have slight inaccuracies for both world wars.

Notable events in German demographics:

- 1831, 1848–1855, 1866, 1892–1893 – Cholera outbreaks
- 1848 – Revolutions of 1848
- 1871 – Smallpox
- 1870–1871 – Franco-Prussian War
- 1899–1900 – Russian flu
- 1914–1918 – First World War
- 1918–1919 – Spanish Flu
- 1939–1945 – Second World War
- 1944–1949 – Flight and expulsion of Germans
- 1955–1973 – Gastarbeiter program
- 1989 – Revolutions of 1989
- 2015 – European migrant crisis
- 2022 – Russian invasion of Ukraine

Year	Average population	Live births	Deaths	Natural change	Crude birth rate (per 1000)	Crude death rate (per 1000)	Natural change (per 1000)	Crude migration change (per 1000)	Total fertility rates (Note: In fertility rates, 2.1 and above is a stable population and have been marked blue, 2 and below leads to an aging population and a reducing population.)		
Year	Average population	Live births	Deaths	Natural change	Crude birth rate (per 1000)	Crude death rate (per 1000)	Natural change (per 1000)	Crude migration change (per 1000)	All of Germany	FRG	(Former) GDR
1817	25,009,000	987,856	675,243	312,613	39.5	27.0	12.5		5.32		
1818	25,369,000	1,002,076	687,500	314,576	39.5	27.1	12.4	2.0	5.33		
1819	25,733,000	1,067,920	717,951	349,969	41.5	27.9	13.6	0.7	5.35		
1820	26,101,000	1,041,430	636,864	404,566	39.9	24.4	15.5	−1.2	5.37		
1821	26,473,000	1,080,098	606,232	473,867	40.8	22.9	17.9	−3.6	5.35		
1822	26,851,000	1,065,985	660,535	405,450	39.7	24.6	15.1	−0.8	5.33		
1823	27,217,000	1,056,020	666,817	389,203	38.8	24.5	14.3	−0.7	5.31		
1824	27,571,000	1,064,241	667,218	397,022	38.6	24.2	14.4	−1.4	5.28		
1825	27,930,000	1,092,063	684,285	407,778	39.1	24.5	14.6	−1.6	5.26		
1826	28,259,000	1,099,275	737,560	361,715	38.9	26.1	12.8	−1.0	5.17		
1827	28,558,000	1,030,944	753,931	277,013	36.1	26.4	9.7	0.9	5.07		
1828	28,863,000	1,041,954	767,756	274,199	36.1	26.6	9.5	1.2	4.97		
1829	29,143,000	1,028,748	810,175	218,573	35.3	27.8	7.5	2.2	4.88		
1830	29,392,000	1,043,416	805,341	238,075	35.5	27.4	8.1	0.4	4.78		
1831	29,642,000	1,037,047	901,117	136,353	35.0	30.4	4.6	3.9	4.80		
1832	29,906,000	1,019,795	864,283	155,511	34.1	28.9	5.2	3.7	4.83		
1833	30,185,000	1,107,790	860,273	247,517	36.7	28.2	8.2	1.1	4.85		
1834	30,467,000	1,145,559	895,730	249,829	37.6	29.4	8.2	1.1	4.88		
1835	30,802,000	1,121,193	807,012	314,180	36.4	26.2	10.2	0.8	4.90		
1836	31,129,000	1,142,434	806,241	336,193	36.7	25.9	10.8	−0.2	4.90		
1837	31,455,000	1,141,817	915,341	226,476	36.3	29.1	7.2	3.3	4.90		
1838	31,824,000	1,155,211	827,424	327,787	36.3	26.0	10.3	1.4	4.90		
1839	32,223,000	1,172,917	876,466	296,452	36.4	27.2	9.2	3.3	4.90		
1840	32,621,000	1,187,404	864,457	322,948	36.4	26.5	9.9	2.5	4.90		
1841	32,979,000	1,201,587	864,075	337,512	36.4	26.2	10.2	0.8	4.92		
1842	33,298,000	1,251,102	902,529	348,573	37.6	27.1	10.5	−0.8	4.95		
1843	33,605,000	1,209,762	905,608	304,154	36.0	26.9	9.1	0.1	4.97		
1844	33,922,000	1,216,429	830,345	386,084	35.9	24.5	11.4	−2.0	5.00		
1845	34,284,000	1,278,286	867,729	410,557	37.3	25.3	12.0	−1.3	5.02		
1846	34,610,000	1,244,369	939,436	304,933	36.0	27.1	8.8	0.7	5.02		
1847	34,784,000	1,156,820	983,981	172,839	33.3	28.3	5.0	0	5.02		
1848	34,839,000	1,160,533	1,011,954	148,579	33.3	29.0	4.3	−2.7	5.01		
1849	35,004,000	1,333,379	947,476	385,903	38.1	27.1	11.0	−6.3	5.01		
1850	35,303,000	1,311,726	903,521	408,203	37.2	25.6	11.6	−3.1	5.01		
1851	35,620,000	1,306,877	889,601	417,276	36.7	25.0	11.7	−2.7	4.87		
1852	35,858,000	1,271,446	1,018,135	253,311	35.5	28.4	7.1	−0.4	4.74		
1853	35,989,000	1,244,192	978,650	265,542	34.6	27.2	7.4	−3.7	4.60		
1854	35,923,000	1,226,769	972,726	254,043	34.0	27.0	6.9	−8.7	4.47		
1855	36,136,000	1,162,945	1,016,284	146,661	32.2	28.1	4.1	1.8	4.33		
1856	36,257,000	1,215,390	913,913	301,477	33.5	25.2	8.3	−5.0	4.45		
1857	36,524,000	1,315,034	991,753	323,281	36.0	27.2	8.9	−1.5	4.56		
1858	36,828,000	1,354,817	985,176	368,641	36.8	26.8	10.0	−1.7	4.67		
1859	37,188,000	1,393,339	956,924	436,415	37.5	25.7	11.7	−1.9	4.79		
1860	37,609,000	1,367,012	873,364	493,648	36.3	23.2	13.1	−1.8	4.90		
1861	38,001,000	1,357,355	972,989	384,366	35.7	25.6	10.1	0.3	4.93		
1862	38,360,000	1,358,896	945,530	413,366	35.4	24.6	10.8	−1.4	4.96		
1863	38,763,000	1,454,340	996,193	458,147	37.5	25.7	11.8	−1.3	5.00		
1864	39,187,000	1,481,778	1,027,756	454,022	37.8	26.2	11.6	−0.7	5.03		
1865	39,545,000	1,488,620	1,091,419	397,201	37.6	27.6	10.0	−0.9	5.06		
1866	39,765,000	1,505,287	1,217,591	287,696	37.8	30.6	7.2	−1.6	5.09		
1867	40,031,000	1,471,747	1,045,534	426,213	36.8	26.1	10.6	−3.9	5.11		
1868	40,223,000	1,481,727	1,110,620	371,107	36.8	27.6	9.2	−4.4	5.13		
1869	40,493,000	1,529,387	1,089,503	439,884	37.8	26.9	10.9	−4.2	5.16		
1870	40,804,000	1,569,206	1,117,875	451,331	38.5	27.4	11.1	−3.4	5.18		
1871	40,997,000	1,414,248	1,212,869	201,379	34.5	29.6	4.9	−0.2	4.47		
1872	41,230,000	1,626,037	1,194,732	431,305	39.5	29.0	10.5	−4.8	5.11		
1873	41,564,000	1,648,117	1,174,293	473,824	39.7	28.3	11.4	−3.3	5.17		
1874	42,004,000	1,683,440	1,122,396	561,044	40.1	26.7	13.4	−2.8	5.24		
1875	42,518,000	1,724,412	1,172,393	552,019	40.6	27.6	13.0	−0.8	5.34		
1876	43,059,000	1,761,046	1,134,452	626,594	40.9	26.3	14.6	−1.9	5.42		
1877	43,610,000	1,744,659	1,152,023	592,636	40.0	26.4	13.6	−0.8	5.34		
1878	44,135,000	1,716,852	1,156,337	560,515	35.5	28.4	12.7	−0.7	5.20		
1879	44,655,000	1,737,080	1,143,168	593,912	38.9	26.2	12.5	−0.7	5.22		
1880	45,095,000	1,696,175	1,173,205	522,970	37.6	26.0	11.6	−1.7	5.05		
1881	45,426,000	1,682,649	1,156,391	525,758	37.0	25.5	11.5	−4.2	4.98		
1882	45,717,000	1,702,348	1,176,853	525,495	37.2	25.7	11.5	−5.1	5.01		
1883	46,014,000	1,683,699	1,190,002	493,697	36.6	25.9	10.7	−4.2	4.92		
1884	46,335,000	1,725,583	1,203,500	522,083	37.2	26.0	11.3	−4.3	5.02		
1885	46,705,000	1,729,927	1,199,742	530,185	37.0	25.7	11.4	−3.4	4.99		
1886	47,103,000	1,746,133	1,233,737	512,396	37.1	26.2	10.9	−2.4	4.99		
1887	47,540,000	1,757,079	1,151,924	605,155	36.9	24.2	12.7	−3.4	4.96		
1888	48,020,000	1,761,407	1,142,826	618,581	36.6	23.7	12.9	−2.8	4.92		
1889	48,512,000	1,772,570	1,153,087	619,483	36.4	23.7	12.8	−2.6	4.88		
1890	49,239,000	1,759,253	1,199,006	560,247	35.7	24.4	11.4	3.6	4.78		
1891	49,767,000	1,840,172	1,164,421	675,751	37.0	23.4	13.6	−2.9	4.92		
1892	50,279,000	1,795,971	1,211,402	584,569	35.7	24.1	11.6	−1.3	4.73		
1893	50,778,000	1,865,715	1,248,201	617,514	36.8	24.6	12.2	−2.3	4.83		
1894	51,339,000	1,841,205	1,144,331	696,874	35.9	22.3	13.6	−2.6	4.70		
1895	52,001,000	1,877,278	1,151,488	725,790	36.1	22.1	14.0	−1.1	4.71		
1896	52,753,000	1,914,749	1,098,966	815,783	36.3	20.8	15.5	−1.0	4.72		
1897	53,549,000	1,926,690	1,142,056	784,634	36.1	21.3	14.7	0.4	4.67		
1898	54,406,000	1,964,731	1,117,860	846,871	36.1	20.5	15.6	0.4	4.69		
1899	55,248,000	1,980,304	1,185,197	795,107	35.9	21.5	14.4	1.1	4.66		
1900	56,046,000	1,996,139	1,236,382	759,757	35.6	22.1	13.6	0.8	4.63		
1901	56,874,000	2,032,313	1,174,489	857,824	35.7	20.7	15.0	−0.2	4.65		
1902	57,767,000	2,024,735	1,122,492	902,243	35.1	19.4	15.7	0	4.56		
1903	58,629,000	1,983,078	1,170,905	812,173	33.8	20.0	13.8	1.1	4.40		
1904	59,475,000	2,025,847	1,163,183	862,664	34.0	19.6	14.5	−0.1	4.42		
1905	60,314,000	1,987,153	1,194,314	792,839	33.0	19.8	13.1	1.0	4.27		
1906	61,153,000	2,022,477	1,112,202	910,275	33.1	18.2	14.9	−1.0	4.28		
1907	62,013,000	1,999,933	1,117,309	882,624	32.3	18.0	14.2	−0.1	4.18		
1908	62,863,000	2,015,052	1,135,490	879,562	32.1	18.1	14.0	−0.3	4.15		
1909	63,857,000	1,978,278	1,094,217	884,061	31.0	17.2	13.9	1.9	4.01		
1910	64,568,000	1,924,778	1,045,665	879,113	29.8	16.2	13.6	−2.5	3.85		
1911	65,359,000	1,870,729	1,130,784	739,945	28.6	17.3	11.3	1.0	3.69		
1912	66,146,000	1,869,636	1,029,749	839,887	28.3	15.6	12.7	−0.7	3.64		
1913	66,978,000	1,838,750	1,004,950	833,800	27.5	15.0	12.4	0.2	3.53		
1914	67,790,000	1,818,596	1,291,310	527,286	26.8	19.0	7.8	4.3	3.44		
1915	67,883,000	1,382,546	1,450,420	−67,874	20.4	21.4	−1.0	2.4	2.58		
1916	67,715,000	1,029,484	1,298,054	−268,570	15.2	19.2	−4.1	1.6	1.90		
1917	67,368,000	912,109	1,345,424	−433,315	13.9	20.6	−6.4	1.3	1.66		
1918	66,811,000	926,813	1,606,475	−679,662	14.3	24.8	−10.2	1.9	1.67		
1919	60,898,000	1,260,500	978,380	282,120	20.0	15.6	4.5	−63.1	2.37		
1920	61,794,000	1,599,287	932,929	666,358	25.9	15.1	10.8	−28.3	3.06		
1921	62,473,000	1,581,130	869,555	711,575	25.3	13.9	11.4	−0.4	2.98		
1922	61,900,000	1,424,804	890,181	534,623	23.0	14.4	8.6	−17.9	2.69		
1923	62,307,000	1,318,489	866,754	451,735	21.2	13.9	7.2	−1.4	2.45		
1924	62,697,000	1,290,763	766,957	523,806	20.6	12.2	8.3	−0.4	2.37		
1925	63,166,000	1,311,259	753,017	558,242	20.8	11.9	8.8	−2.9	2.38		
1926	63,630,000	1,245,471	742,955	502,516	19.6	11.7	7.9	−1.6	2.23		
1927	64,023,000	1,178,892	765,331	413,561	18.4	12.0	6.5	0.3	2.09		
1928	64,393,000	1,199,998	747,444	452,554	18.6	11.6	7.0	1.3	2.11		
1929	64,739,000	1,164,062	814,545	349,517	18.0	12.6	5.4	−2.3	2.02		
1930	65,084,000	1,144,151	718,807	425,344	17.6	11.0	6.5	0.6	1.98		
1931	65,429,000	1,047,775	734,165	313,610	16.0	11.2	4.8	1.0	1.80		
1932	65,716,000	993,126	707,642	285,484	15.1	10.8	4.3	−1.2	1.70		
1933	66,027,000	971,174	737,877	233,297	14.7	11.2	3.5	1.2	1.67		
1934	66,409,000	1,198,350	725,000	473,000	18.0	10.9	7.1	−1.3	2.07		
1935	66,871,000	1,263,976	792,018	471,958	18.9	11.8	7.1	−0.1	2.20		
1936	67,349,000	1,278,583	795,793	482,790	19.0	11.8	7.2	−0.1	2.25		
1937	67,831,000	1,277,046	794,367	482,679	18.8	11.7	7.1	0.1	2.28		
1938	68,558,000	1,348,534	799,220	549,314	19.7	11.7	8.0	0.7	2.45		
1939	69,314,000	1,413,230	873,348	539,882	20.4	12.6	7.8	5.2	2.59		
1940	69,838,000	1,402,258	968,591	433,667	20.1	13.9	6.2	1.3	2.59		
1941	70,244,000	1,308,232	1,201,435	106,797	18.6	17.1	1.5	4.3	2.43		
1942	70,834,000	1,055,915	1,419,861	−363,946	14.9	20.0	−5.1	13.5	1.97		
1943	70,411,000	1,124,718	1,665,246	−540,528	16.0	23.7	−7.7	1.7	2.10		
1944	69,865,000	1,090,000(e)	2,717,000	−1,627,000	15.8	39.4	−23.6	3.6	2.05		
1945	66,000,000	820,000(e)	2,750,000	−1,930,000	12.4	41.7	−29.2	−14.3	1.56		
1946	65,137,000	921,998	1,077,331	−155,333	14.3	16.8	−2.4	−21.9	1.80	1.91	1.47
1947	65,832,000	1,028,421	965,628	62,793	15.6	14.7	1.0	23.7	1.99	2.02	1.92
1948	67,365,000	1,049,074	817,839	231,235	15.6	12.1	3.4	19.7	2.03	2.08	1.89
1949	68,079,000	1,106,803	779,852	326,951	16.3	11.5	4.8	5.8	2.14	2.15	2.13
1950	68,374,000	1,116,701	754,329	362,372	16.3	11.0	5.3	−1.0	2.17	2.10	2.37
1951	68,883,000	1,106,380	755,697	350,683	16.1	11.0	5.1	2.3	2.16	2.07	2.43
1952	69,173,000	1,105,084	769,639	335,445	16.0	11.1	4.9	−0.7	2.16	2.08	2.40
1953	69,564,000	1,095,029	791,654	303,375	15.7	11.4	4.4	1.3	2.13	2.05	2.37
1954	69,934,000	1,109,743	776,291	333,452	15.9	11.1	4.8	0.5	2.16	2.10	2.35
1955	70,308,000	1,113,408	795,938	317,470	15.8	11.3	4.5	0.8	2.17	2.11	2.35
1956	70,710,000	1,137,169	812,111	325,058	16.1	11.5	4.6	1.1	2.22	2.20	2.26
1957	71,197,000	1,165,555	840,195	325,360	16.4	11.8	4.6	1.8	2.28	2.30	2.21
1958	71,712,000	1,175,870	818,418	357,452	16.4	11.4	5.0	1.6	2.29	2.29	2.22
1959	72,294,000	1,243,922	835,402	408,520	17.2	11.6	5.7	1.9	2.36	2.37	2.35
1960	72,664,000	1,261,614	876,721	384,893	17.4	12.1	5.3	1.4	2.36	2.37	2.33
1961	73,352,000	1,313,505	850,300	463,205	17.9	11.6	6.3	3.2	2.44	2.46	2.40
1962	74,049,000	1,316,534	878,814	437,720	17.8	11.9	5.9	3.6	2.44	2.44	2.42
1963	75,019,000	1,355,595	895,070	460,525	18.1	11.9	6.1	7.0	2.51	2.52	2.47
1964	75,273,000	1,357,304	870,319	486,985	18.0	11.6	6.5	−3.1	2.54	2.54	2.48
1965	76,061,000	1,325,386	907,882	417,504	17.4	11.9	5.5	5.0	2.50	2.51	2.48
1966	76,734,000	1,318,303	911,984	406,319	17.2	11.9	5.3	3.5	2.51	2.54	2.42
1967	76,954,000	1,272,276	914,417	357,859	16.5	11.9	4.7	−1.8	2.46	2.49	2.34
1968	77,249,000	1,214,968	976,521	238,447	15.7	12.6	3.1	0.7	2.36	2.38	2.30
1969	77,918,000	1,142,366	988,092	154,274	14.7	12.7	2.0	6.7	2.22	2.21	2.24
1970	78,205,000	1,047,737	975,664	72,073	13.5	12.5	0.9	−2.8	2.05	2.02	2.19
1971	78,355,000	1,013,396	965,623	47,773	12.9	12.3	0.6	6.9	1.97	1.92	2.13
1972	78,717,000	901,657	965,689	−64,032	11.5	12.3	−0.8	5.4	1.73	1.71	1.79
1973	78,951,000	815,969	962,988	−147,019	10.3	12.2	−1.9	4.9	1.56	1.54	1.58
1974	78,966,000	805,500	956,573	−151,073	10.2	12.1	−1.9	2.1	1.53	1.51	1.54
1975	78,862,000	782,310	989,649	−207,339	9.9	12.5	−2.6	1.3	1.48	1.45	1.54
1976	78,299,000	798,334	966,873	−168,539	10.2	12.3	−2.2	−4.9	1.50	1.46	1.64
1977	78,161,000	805,496	931,155	−125,659	10.3	11.9	−1.6	−0.2	1.51	1.41	1.85
1978	78,066,000	808,619	955,550	−146,931	10.4	12.2	−1.9	0.7	1.50	1.38	1.90
1979	78,082,000	817,217	944,474	−127,257	10.5	12.1	−1.6	1.8	1.50	1.38	1.90
1980	78,295,000	865,789	952,371	−86,582	11.1	12.2	−1.1	3.8	1.56	1.45	1.94
1981	78,399,000	862,100	954,436	−92,336	11.0	12.2	−1.2	2.5	1.53	1.44	1.85
1982	78,293,000	861,275	943,832	−82,557	11.0	12.1	−1.1	−0.3	1.51	1.41	1.86
1983	78,082,000	827,933	941,032	−113,099	10.6	12.1	−1.4	−1.3	1.43	1.33	1.79
1984	77,797,000	812,292	917,299	−105,007	10.4	11.8	−1.3	−2.4	1.38	1.29	1.74
1985	77,619,000	813,803	929,649	−115,846	10.5	12.0	−1.5	−0.8	1.37	1.28	1.73
1986	77,635,000	848,232	925,426	−77,194	10.9	11.9	−1.0	1.2	1.41	1.35	1.70
1987	77,718,000	867,969	901,291	−33,322	11.2	11.6	−0.4	1.5	1.44	1.37	1.74
1988	78,116,000	892,993	900,627	−7,634	11.4	11.5	−0.1	5.2	1.46	1.41	1.67
1989	78,677,000	880,459	903,441	−22,982	11.2	11.5	−0.3	7.5	1.42	1.40	1.57
1990	79,753,227	905,675	921,445	−15,770	11.4	11.6	−0.2	13.9	1.45	1.45	1.52
1991	80,274,564	830,019	911,245	−81,226	10.4	11.4	−1.0	7.5	1.33	1.42	0.98
1992	80,974,632	809,114	885,443	−76,329	10.1	11.0	−1.0	9.7	1.29	1.40	0.83
1993	81,338,093	798,447	897,270	−98,823	9.9	11.1	−1.2	5.7	1.28	1.39	0.78
1994	81,538,603	769,603	884,661	−115,058	9.5	10.9	−1.4	3.9	1.24	1.35	0.77
1995	81,817,499	765,221	884,588	−119,367	9.4	10.8	−1.5	4.9	1.25	1.34	0.84
1996	82,012,162	796,013	882,843	−86,830	9.7	10.8	−1.1	3.5	1.32	1.40	0.95
1997	82,057,379	812,173	860,389	−48,216	9.9	10.5	−0.6	1.2	1.37	1.44	1.04
1998	82,037,011	785,034	852,382	−67,348	9.6	10.4	−0.8	0.6	1.36	1.41	1.09
1999	82,163,475	770,744	846,330	−75,586	9.4	10.3	−0.9	2.4	1.36	1.41	1.15
2000	82,259,540	766,999	838,797	−71,798	9.3	10.2	−0.9	2.1	1.38	1.41	1.21
2001	82,440,309	734,475	828,541	−94,066	8.9	10.1	−1.1	3.3	1.35	1.38	1.23
2002	82,536,680	719,250	841,686	−122,436	8.7	10.2	−1.5	2.7	1.34	1.37	1.24
2003	82,531,671	706,721	853,946	−147,225	8.6	10.3	−1.8	1.7	1.34	1.36	1.26
2004	82,500,849	705,622	818,271	−112,649	8.5	9.9	−1.4	1.0	1.36	1.37	1.31
2005	82,437,995	685,795	830,227	−144,432	8.3	10.1	−1.8	1.0	1.34	1.36	1.30
2006	82,314,906	672,724	821,627	−148,903	8.2	10.0	−1.8	0.3	1.33	1.34	1.30
2007	82,217,837	684,862	827,155	−142,293	8.3	10.0	−1.7	0.5	1.37	1.38	1.37
2008	82,002,356	682,514	844,439	−161,925	8.3	10.3	−2.0	−3.1	1.38	1.37	1.40
2009	81,802,257	665,126	854,544	−189,418	8.1	10.4	−2.3	2.3	1.36	1.35	1.40
2010	81,751,602	677,947	858,768	−180,821	8.3	10.5	−2.2	1.6	1.39	1.39	1.46
2011	80,233,100	662,685	852,328	−189,643	8.3	10.4	−2.3	−16.3	1.39	1.38	1.46
2012	80,399,300	673,544	869,582	−196,038	8.4	10.8	−2.4	4.5	1.41	1.40	1.48
2013	80,585,700	682,069	893,825	−211,756	8.5	11.1	−2.6	5.0	1.42	1.41	1.49
2014	80,925,000	714,927	868,356	−153,429	8.9	10.8	−1.9	6.1	1.47	1.47	1.54
2015	81,459,000	737,575	925,200	−187,625	9.1	11.4	−2.3	8.9	1.50	1.50	1.56
2016	82,349,400	792,141	910,902	−118,761	9.6	11.1	−1.4	12.4	1.59	1.60	1.64
2017	82,665,600	784,901	932,272	−147,371	9.5	11.3	−1.8	5.6	1.57	1.58	1.61
2018	82,887,000	787,523	954,874	−167,351	9.5	11.5	−2.0	4.7	1.57	1.58	1.60
2019	83,073,062	778,090	939,520	−161,430	9.4	11.3	−1.9	4.2	1.54	1.56	1.56
2020	83,155,031	773,144	985,572	−212,428	9.3	11.8	−2.6	3.2	1.53	1.55	1.54
2021	83,237,124	795,492	1,023,687	−228,195	9.6	12.3	−2.7	2.8	1.58	1.60	1.54
2022	83,118,501	738,819	1,066,341	−327,522	8.9	12.8	−3.9	15.4	1.49	1.51	1.46
2023	83,456,045	692,989	1,028,206	−335,217	8.3	12.3	−4.0	8.8	1.38	1.41	1.33
2024	83,577,140	677,117	1,007,758	−330,641	8.1	12.1	−4.0	5.6	1.35	1.38	1.27
2025	83,467,117	654,241	1,006,588	-352,079	7.8	12.1	–4.3	2.7	1.32	1.34	1.22
2026	83,298,787 (p)										

– (p) = provisional. To be revised.

In 2023, 500,670 (72.25%) children were born to mothers with German citizenship, while 96,422 (13.91%) children were born to mothers with European citizenship (excluding Turkey) and 95,897 (13.84%) children were born to mothers with other citizenship.

Source for average population. Sources for data from 2011: Population 2011 to 2021 (based on 2011 European Union census), Population from 2022 (based on 2022 German census), live births, live births, deaths and natural population change, deaths, total fertility rates, current news on population.

=== Current vital statistics ===
Period	Live births *	Deaths	Natural increase
January—August 2025	435,373	674,784	–239,411
January—August 2026	432,996	676,133	–243,137
Difference	▼ –2,377 (–0.55%)	▲ +1,349 (+0.2%)	▼ –3,726

* – estimation for both years, as of the same date.

View source data.

=== Total fertility rates by federal state and nationality ===
2025 fertility rates
State	TFR
Lower Saxony	1.38
Rhineland-Palatinate	1.36
Baden-Württemberg	1.35
Bavaria	1.35
North Rhine-Westphalia	1.35
Hesse	1.34
Germany	1.32
Bremen	1.31
Brandenburg	1.30
Saarland	1.29
Saxony-Anhalt	1.27
Schleswig-Holstein	1.26
Hamburg	1.24
Mecklenburg-Vorpommern	1.21
Thuringia	1.20
Berlin	1.19
Saxony	1.16

==== Regierungsbezirke and cities ====
2024 fertility rates
Regierungsbezirk or city	TFR
Stuttgart	1.43
Karlsruhe	1.33
Freiburg	1.40
Tübingen	1.44
Upper Bavaria	1.35
Lower Bavaria	1.46
Upper Palatinate	1.46
Upper Franconia	1.36
Middle Franconia	1.38
Lower Franconia	1.39
Swabia	1.48
Darmstadt	1.37
Giessen	1.35
Kassel	1.42
Braunschweig	1.36
Hannover	1.39
Lüneburg	1.49
Weser-Ems	1.46
Düsseldorf	1.37
Cologne	1.31
Münster	1.47
Detmold	1.50
Arnsberg	1.41
Koblenz	1.41
Trier	1.32
Rheinhessen-Pfalz	1.43
Dresden	1.23
Leipzig	1.07
Germany	1.36

==== Nationality ====
2025 fertility rates
Nationality/region	TFR
Germany total	1.32
German nationality	1.20
Foreign nationality	1.78
Former West Germany + Berlin	1.34
Former East Germany	1.22

=== Structure of the population by age groups ===
Population by sex and age group (census 09 May 2011)
Age group	Male	Female	Total	Percent
Total	39,145,941	41,073,754	80,219,695	100
0–4	1,714,872	1,624,023	3,338,895	4.16
5–9	1,809,024	1,716,806	3,525,830	4.40
10–14	2,021,305	1,919,261	3,940,566	4.91
15–19	2,057,155	1,956,725	4,013,880	5.00
20–24	2,463,932	2,371,707	4,835,639	6.03
25–29	2,455,885	2,416,648	4,872,533	6.07
30–34	2,385,305	2,366,606	4,751,911	5.92
35–39	2,378,055	2,364,838	4,742,893	5.91
40–44	3,209,481	3,141,708	6,351,189	7.92
45–49	3,547,254	3,452,425	6,999,679	8.73
50–54	3,113,463	3,092,831	6,206,294	7.74
55–59	2,668,976	2,750,474	5,419,450	6.76
60–64	2,298,903	2,403,912	4,702,815	5.86
65–69	1,999,287	2,174,064	4,173,351	5.20
70–74	2,247,196	2,614,043	4,861,239	6.06
75–79	1,413,881	1,856,402	3,270,283	4.08
80–84	878,797	1,449,286	2,328,083	2.90
85–89	369,029	966,047	1,335,076	1.66
90–94	95,074	335,526	430,600	0.54
95–99	17,388	88,656	106,044	0.13
100+	1,679	11,766	13,445	0.02
Age group	Male	Female	Total	Percent
0–14	5,545,201	5,260,090	10,805,291	13.47
15–64	26,578,409	26,317,874	52,896,283	65.94
65+	7,022,331	9,495,790	16,518,121	20.59

Population estimates by sex and age group (01 January 2021) (based on the results of the 2011 population census)
Age group	Male	Female	Total	Percent
Total	41,026,519	42,128,512	83,155,031	100
0–4	2,036,084	1,933,054	3,969,138	4.77
5–9	1,944,171	1,839,397	3,783,568	4.55
10–14	1,916,110	1,808,984	3,725,094	4.48
15–19	1,991,487	1,865,287	3,856,774	4.64
20–24	2,394,221	2,176,270	4,570,491	5.50
25–29	2,552,806	2,360,133	4,912,939	5.91
30–34	2,876,938	2,704,150	5,581,088	6.71
35–39	2,688,873	2,602,003	5,290,876	6.36
40–44	2,531,208	2,503,680	5,034,888	6.05
45–49	2,526,278	2,509,582	5,035,860	6.06
50–54	3,265,131	3,222,093	6,487,224	7.80
55–59	3,414,124	3,403,194	6,817,318	8.20
60–64	2,866,561	2,951,576	5,818,137	7.00
65–69	2,333,788	2,565,316	4,899,104	5.89
70–74	1,854,514	2,113,556	3,968,070	4.77
75–79	1,551,030	1,916,998	3,468,028	4.17
80–84	1,432,318	1,998,184	3,430,502	4.13
85–89	615,608	1,046,633	1,662,241	2.00
90–94	200,432	471,151	671,583	0.81
95–99	30,826	120,817	151,643	0.18
100–104	3,122	13,587	16,709	0.02
105–109	703	2,417	3,120	<0.01
110+	186	450	636	<0.01
Age group	Male	Female	Total	Percent
0–14	5,896,365	5,581,435	11,477,800	13.80
15–64	27,107,627	26,297,968	53,405,595	64.22
65+	8,022,527	10,249,109	18,271,636	21.97

== Social issues ==
Most childbirths in Germany happen within marriage. Out of 778,080 births in 2019, 258,835 were to unmarried parents, which means that around 33% or one third of the children are born out of wedlock, while two thirds are within. This percentage of unmarried birth has long been growing and reached 33% in 2010, more than twice of what it was in 1990. However, in recent years it has started to stagnate or even decrease.

The Mikrozensus done in 2008 revealed that the number of children a German woman aged 40 to 75 had, was closely linked to her educational achievement. In Western Germany, women with tertiary education had the highest rates of childlessness — 26% stated that they were childless. This rate dropped to 16% for those with intermediate education, and 11% for those with only compulsory education. In Eastern Germany however, 9% of the most educated women of that age group and 7% of those who had an intermediary education were childless, while 12% of those having only compulsory education were childless.

The reason for that east-western difference is that the GDR had an "educated mother scheme" and actively tried to encourage first births among the more educated. It did so by propagandizing the opinion that every educated woman should "present at least one child to socialism" and also by financially rewarding its more educated citizen to become parents. The government especially tried to persuade students to become parents while still in college and it was quite successful in doing so. In 1986, 38% of all women, who were about to graduate from college, were mothers of at least one child and an additional 14% were pregnant and 43% of all men, who were about to graduate from college, were fathers of at least one child. There was a sharp decline in the birth rate and especially in the birth rate of the educated after the fall of the Berlin wall. Nowadays, 5% of those about to graduate from college are parents.

The more educated a Western German mother aged 40 to 75 was in 2008, the less likely she was to have a big family.

Percent of Western German mothers having 1, 2, and 3 or more children, by educational attainment
Number of children	Compulsory education	Intermediary education	Highest education
One child	22	30	31
Two children	39	48	48
Three or more children	39	22	21

The same was true for a mother living in Eastern Germany in 2008.

Percent of Eastern German mothers having 1, 2, and 3 or more children, by educational attainment
Number of children	Compulsory education	Intermediary education	Highest education
One child	23	33	33
Two children	37	46	51
Three or more children	40	21	16

In 2011, this trend was reversed in Eastern Germany, where more highly educated women now had a somewhat higher fertility rate than the rest of the population.

Persons who said they had no religion tend to have fewer children than those who identify as Christians, and studies also found that conservative-leaning Christians had more children compared to liberal-leaning Christians.

A study done in 2005 in the western German state of Nordrhein-Westfalen by the HDZ revealed that childlessness was especially widespread among scientists. It showed that 78% of the women scientists and 71% of the male scientists working in that state were childless.

=== Homelessness ===
Homelessness in Germany is a significant social issue, estimated to affect around 678,000 people, including about 372,000 people accommodated by public services, e.g., in municipal refugee shelters. As of 2017 there had been a 150% increase in the homeless population within the country since 2014. Around 22,000 of the homeless population are reported to be children.

In addition, the country has yet to publish statistics on homelessness at a Federal Level despite it being an ongoing and widespread matter.

== Ethnic minorities and migrant background (Migrationshintergrund) ==
Germany does not collect data on the ethnic and racial identifications of its citizens, but does collect data on the background group by birth of an individual. The Federal Statistical Office defines persons with a migrant background as all persons who migrated to the present area of the Federal Republic of Germany after 1949, plus all foreign nationals born in Germany and all persons born in Germany as German nationals with at least one parent who migrated to Germany or was born in Germany as a foreign national. The figures presented here are based on this definition only.

In 2010, 2.3 million families with children under 18 years were living in Germany, in which at least one parent had foreign roots. They represented 29% of the total of 8.1 million families with minor children. Compared with 2005 – the year when the microcensus started to collect detailed information on the population with a migrant background – the proportion of migrant families has risen by 2 percentage points. In 2019, 40% children under 5 years old had migrant background.

Most of the families with a migrant background live in the western part of Germany. In 2010, the proportion of migrant families in all families was 32% in the former territory of the Federal Republic. This figure was more than double that in the new Länder (incl. Berlin) where it stood at 15%. Eastern Germany has a much lower proportion of immigrants than the West, as the GDR did not let in that many guest workers and Eastern Germany's economy is not doing as well as West Germany's and had a higher percentage of jobless persons until recently. However, in recent years the number of people with an immigrant background in East Germany has been growing as refugees (as well as German Repatriates) are distributed with the Königssteiner Schlüssel, so every German state has to take the same number of them compared to its population and economy. In 2019 19.036 million people or 89,6% of people with an immigrant background live in Western Germany (excluding Berlin), being 28,7% of its population, while 1.016 million people with immigrant background 4,8% live in Eastern States, being 8,2% of population, and 1.194 million people with an immigrant background 5,6% live in Berlin, being 33,1% of its population.

In 2019, 26% of Germans of any age group (up from 18,4% in 2008) and 39% of German children (up from 30% in 2008) had at least one parent born abroad. Average age for Germans with at least one parent born abroad was 35.6 years (up from 33.8 years in 2008), while that for Germans, who had two parents born in Germany was 47.3 years (up from 44.6 in 2008).

In 2022, 41 percent of the under-15 age group had a migrant background, 36 percent of the 15 to 49-year-old age group had a migrant background and 19 percent of the age group above (50+).

The largest groups of people with an immigrant background in Germany are people that have Turkey, Poland and Russia as their ancestral homelands.

As of 2022, the population by background was as follows:

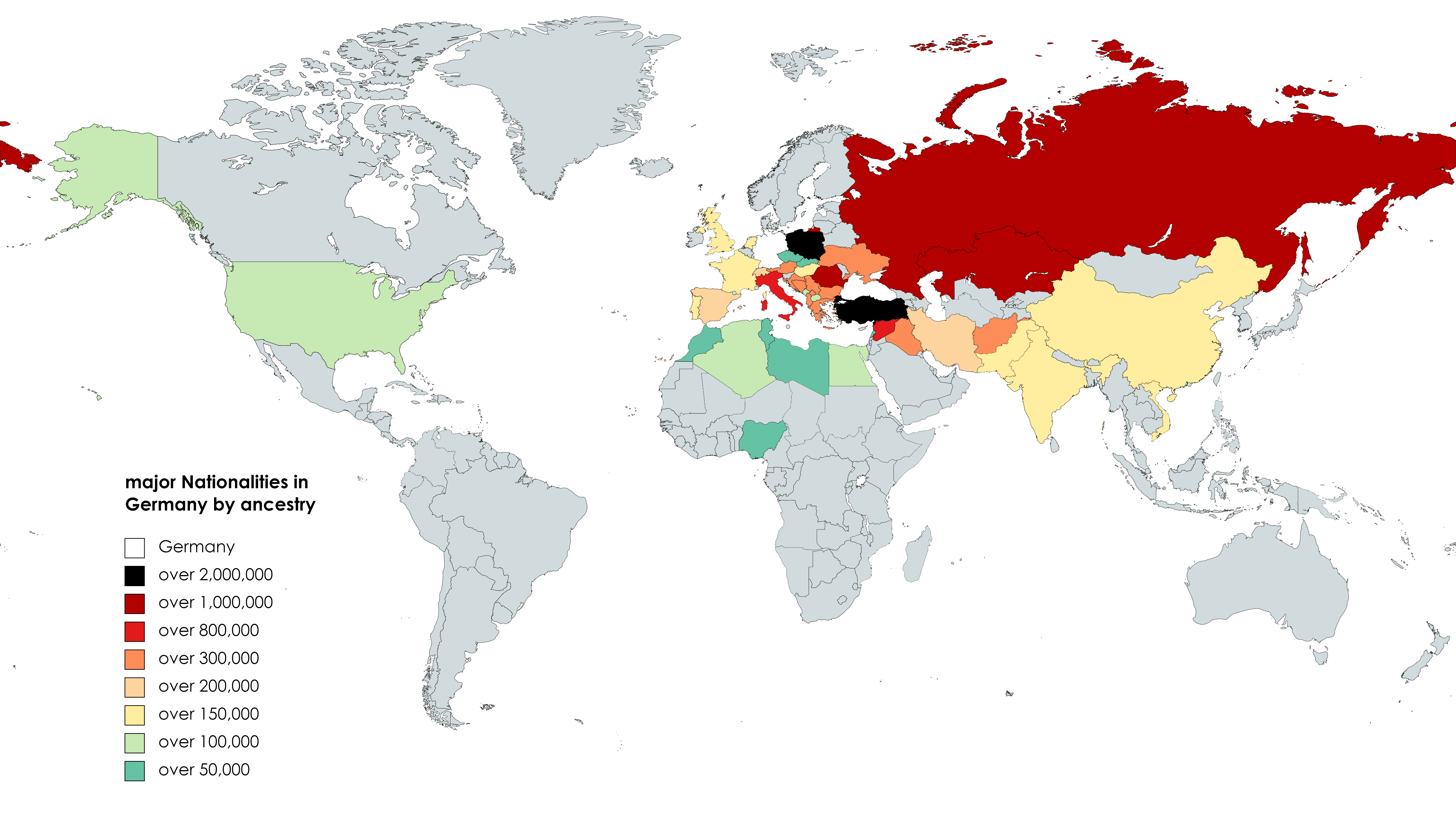
Major groups which reside in Germany by ancestry as of 2019

Population of Germany in 2025
1. Germans (68.9%)
2. EU-27 (10.4%)
3. European (Other) (5.80%)
4. Asian (10.5%)
5. African (1.50%)
6. American (North & South) (0.90%)
7. Oceania (0.03%)
8. Other/Unspecified/Mixed (1.90%)
Population pyramids by migration background, 2025

Population pyramid by migration background, 2025

Without migration background

With migration background

Background group	Year									
Background group	2005		2011		2016		2022		2025	
Background group	Number	%	Number	%	Number	%	Number	%	Number	%
European
Overall					72,625,000	89.2%	71,111,000	85.5%	71,407,000	85.1%
EU-27 States
Without migrant background	66,413,000	81.3%	64,551,000	81.4%	62,989,000	77.4%	59,278,000	71.3%	56,974,000	68,9%
Polish (including ethnic German repatriates from Poland)	1,046,000		1,424,000		1,868,000	2,3%	2,201,000	2.6%	2,245,000	2.6%
Romanian (including ethnic German repatriates from Romania)	406,000		472,000		788,000	1%	1,096,000	1.3%	1,114,000	1.4%
Italian (including ethnic South Tyroleans)	794,000		701,000		861,000	1,1%	905,000	1.1%	828,000	1.0%
Greek	386,000		349,000		443,000	0,5%	434,000	0.5%	435,000	0.5%
Croat	410,000		325,000		441,000	0,5%	419,000	0.5%	359,000	0.5%
Austrian	309,000		254,000		280,000	0,3%	353,000	0.4%	336,000	0.4%
Bulgarian	49,000		77,000		238,000	0,3%	340,000	0.4%	382,000	0.4%
Spanish	173,000		142,000		209,000	0,3%	233,000	0.3%	237,000	0.3%
Dutch	190,000		203,000		206,000	0,3%	233,000	0.3%	207,000	0.3%
French	157,000		153,000		168,000	0,2%	228,000	0.3%	224,000	0.3%
Other EU member states (primarily Hungarian, Czech, and Portuguese)					824,000	1%	1,129,000	1.4%	1,122,000	1.3%
Overall					69,315,000	85.1%	66,849,000	80.4%	66,533,000	79.3%
European Other
Russian (including ethnic German repatriates from Russia)	1,290,000		1,189,000		1,223,000	1,5%	1,354,000	1.6%	1,365,000	1.6%
Ukrainian	–		246,000		272,000	0,3%	583,000	0.7%	1,355,000	1.2%
Kosovar	–		270,000		356,000	0,4%	542,000	0.7%	615,000	0.7%
Bosnian	329,000		202,000		248,000	0,3%	538,000	0.6%	554,000	0.7%
Serb	263,065		252,000		288,000	0,4%	382,000	0.5%	367,000	0.5%
Others (primarily Macedonian, Swiss and British)					923,000	1.1%	863,000	1%	950,000	1.1%
Overall					3,310,000	4.1%	4,262,000	5.1%	4,874,000	5.8%
Asians
Turkish (including ethnic Kurds)	2,766,000		2,643,000		2,797,000	3,4%	2,835,000	3.4%	3,081,000	3.5%
Kazakh (including ethnic German repatriates from Kazakhstan)	–		917,000		969,000	1,2%	1,325,000	1.6%	1,335,000	1.6%
Syrian (including ethnic Kurds)	–		53,000		521,000	0,6%	1,225,000	1.5%	1,281,000	1.5%
Afghan	88,000		131,000		231,000	0,3%	435,000	0.5%	515,000	0.6%
Iraqi (including ethnic Kurds)	113,000		106,000		206,000	0,3%	393,000	0.5%	362,000	0.5%
Iranian (including ethnic Kurds)	150,000		130,000		164,000	0,2%	304,000	0.4%	334,000	0.4%
Chinese	80,000		93,000		157,000	0,2%	217,000	0.3%	220,000	0.3%
Vietnamese	150,000		146,000		167,000	0,2%	236,000	0.2%	239,000	0.2%
Others					1,006,000	1,2%	1,554,000	1.9%	1,662,000	2.0%
Overall					6,218,000	7,6%	8,495,000	10.3%	8,842,000	10.5%
African
Sub-Saharan African	222,000		246,000		395,000	0,5%	660,000	0.8%	711,000	0.8%
Moroccan	147,000		141,000		191,000	0,2%	257,000	0.3%	284,000	0.3%
Other Maghreb countries:	108,000		121,000		158,000	0,2%	242,000	0.3%	281,000	0.3%
Overall	477,000		508,000		744,000	0.9%	1,159,000	1.4%	1,270,000	1.5%
Americas
American	140,000		123,000		154,000	0,2%	216,000	0.3%	229,000	0.3%
Other peoples from the Americas	191,000		201,000		267,000	0,3%	466,000	0.5%	499,000	0.6%
Overall	331,000		324,000		421,000	0,5%	682,000	0.8%	714,000	0.8%
Australia/Oceania
Overall	–				40,000	0,05%	26,000	0.03%	29,000	0.03%
Other/unspecified/mixed
Overall	2,536,000		1,310,000		1,381,000	1,7%	1,628,000	1.9%	1,613,000	1.9%
Total: Foreign background
Overall	15,227,000		14,796,000		18,443,000	22,6%	23,825,000	28.7%	24,907,000	29.7%
Total	81,640,000		79,347,000		81,432,000	100%	83,103,000	100%	83,875,000	100%

Migration background age structure in Germany in 2021

Age structure by migration background in Germany in 2021

Without migration background age structure

With migration background

One parent with migration background
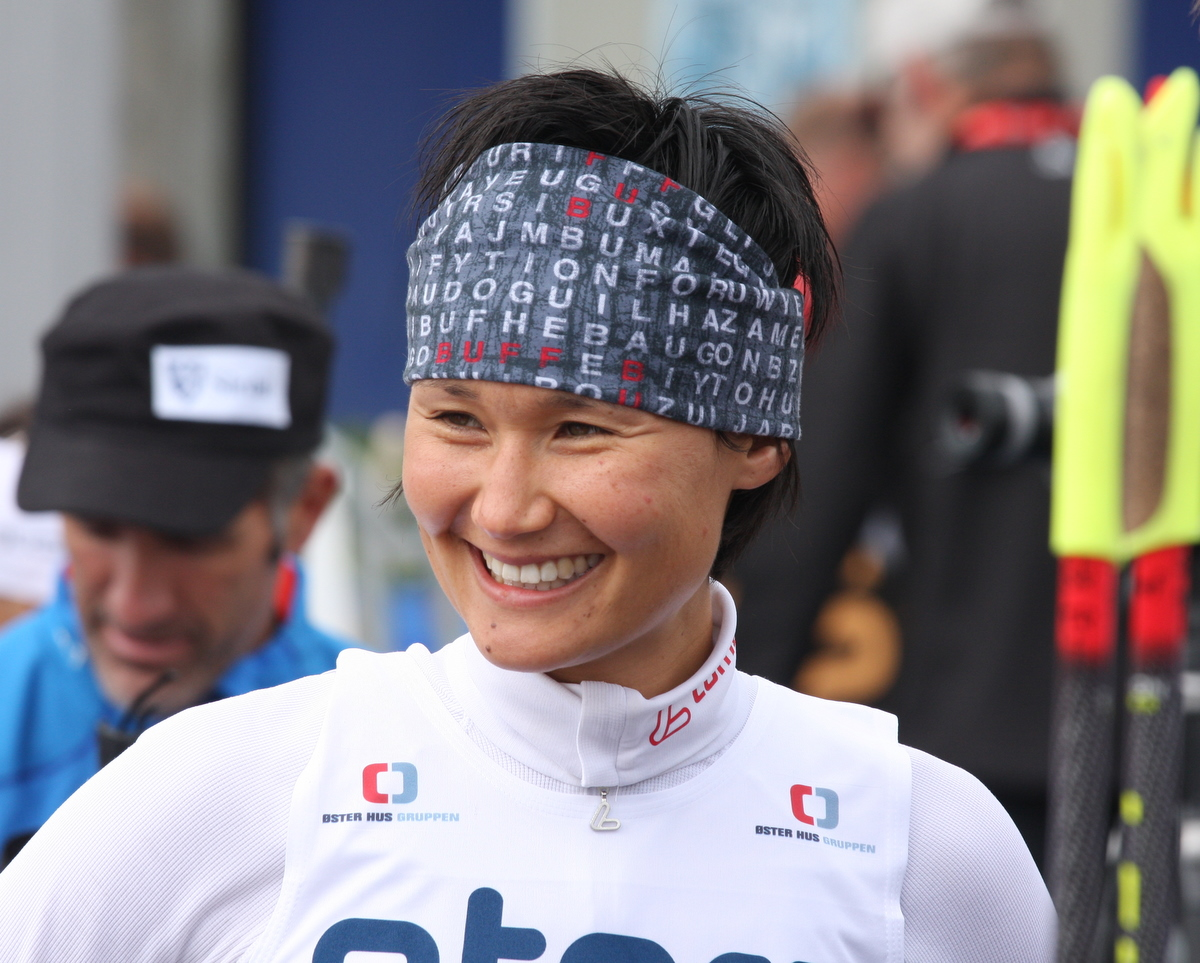
Simone Hauswald has a migration background due to her mother being Korean.

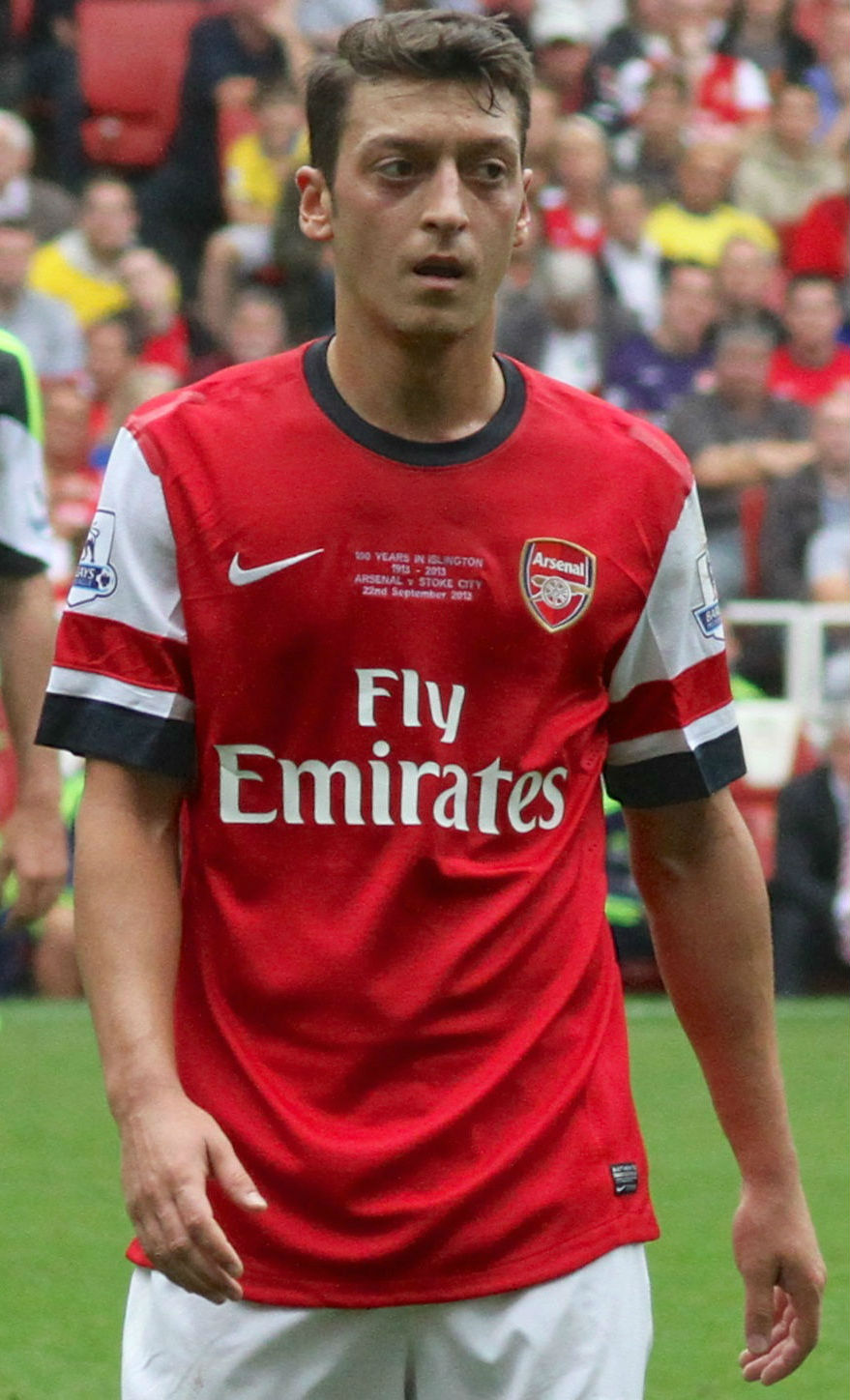
Mesut Özil is classified as having a migrant background because both of his parents were born in Turkey.

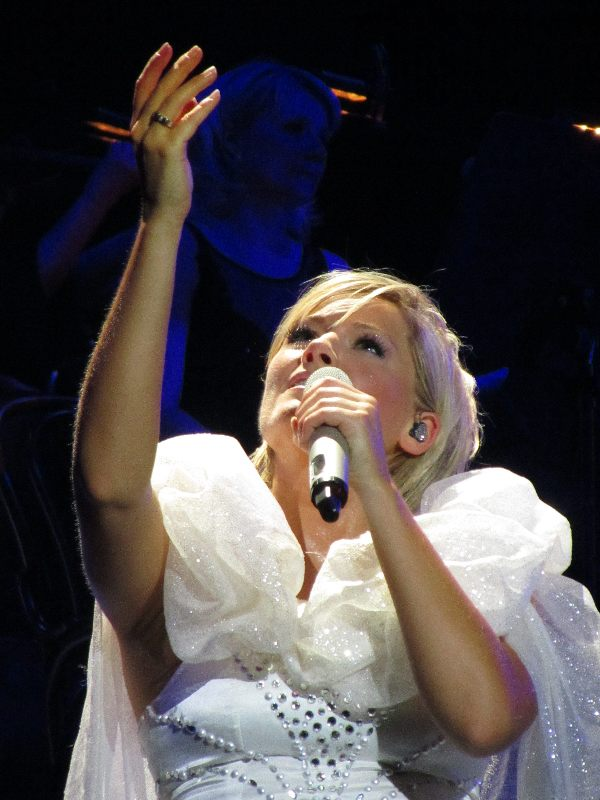
Helene Fischer has a migrant background despite being ethnically German because she was born in the Soviet Union to parents of the German minority in Russia.

Four other sizable groups of people are referred to as "national minorities" (nationale Minderheiten) because they have lived in their respective regions for centuries: Danes, Frisians, Roma and Sinti, and Sorbs. There is a Danish minority (about 50,000, according to government sources) in the northernmost state of Schleswig-Holstein. Eastern and Northern Frisians live at Schleswig-Holstein's western coast, and in the north-western part of Lower Saxony. They are part of a wider community (Frisia) stretching from Germany to the northern Netherlands. The Sorbs, a Slavic people with about 60,000 members (according to government sources), are in the Lusatia region of Saxony and Brandenburg. They are the last remnants of the Slavs that lived in central and eastern Germany since the 7th century to have kept their traditions and not been completely integrated into the wider German nation.

Until World War II the Poles were recognized as one of the national minorities. In 1924 the Union of Poles in Germany had initiated cooperation between all national minorities in Germany under the umbrella organization Association of National Minorities in Germany. Some of the union members wanted the Polish communities in easternmost Germany (now Poland) to join the newly established Polish nation after World War I. Even before the German invasion of Poland, leading anti-Nazi members of the Polish minority were deported to concentration camps; some were executed at the Piaśnica murder site. Minority rights for Poles in Germany were revoked by Hermann Göring's World War II decree of 27 February 1940, and their property was confiscated.

After the war ended, the German government did not re-implement national minority rights for ethnic Poles. The reason for this is that the areas of Germany which formerly had a native Polish minority were annexed to Poland and the Soviet Union, while almost all of the native German populations (formerly the ethnic majority) in these areas subsequently fled or were expelled by force. With the mixed German-Polish territories now lost, the German government subsequently regarded ethnic Poles residing in what remained of Germany as immigrants, just like any other ethnic population with a recent history of arrival. In contrast, Germans living in Poland are recognized as national minority and have granted seats in Polish Parliament. It must be said, however, that an overwhelming number of Germans in Poland have centuries-old historical ties to the lands they now inhabit, whether from living in territory that once belonged to the German state, or from centuries-old communities. In contrast, most Poles in present-day Germany are recent immigrants, though there are some communities which have been present since the 19th and perhaps even the 18th centuries. Despite protests by some in the older Polish-German communities, and despite Germany being now a signatory to the Framework Convention for the Protection of National Minorities, Germany has so far refused to re-implement minority rights for ethnic Poles, based on the fact that almost all areas of historically mixed German-Polish heritage (where the minority rights formerly existed) are no longer part of Germany and because the vast majority of ethnic Poles now residing in Germany are recent immigrants.

Roma people have been in Germany since the Middle Ages. They were persecuted by the Nazis, and thousands of Roma living in Germany were killed by the Nazi regime. Nowadays, they are spread all over Germany, mostly living in major cities. It is difficult to estimate their exact number, as the German government counts them as "persons without migrant background" in their statistics. There are also many assimilated Sinti and Roma. A vague figure given by the German Department of the Interior is about 70,000. In contrast to the old-established Roma population, the majority of them do not have German citizenship, and are classified as immigrants or refugees.

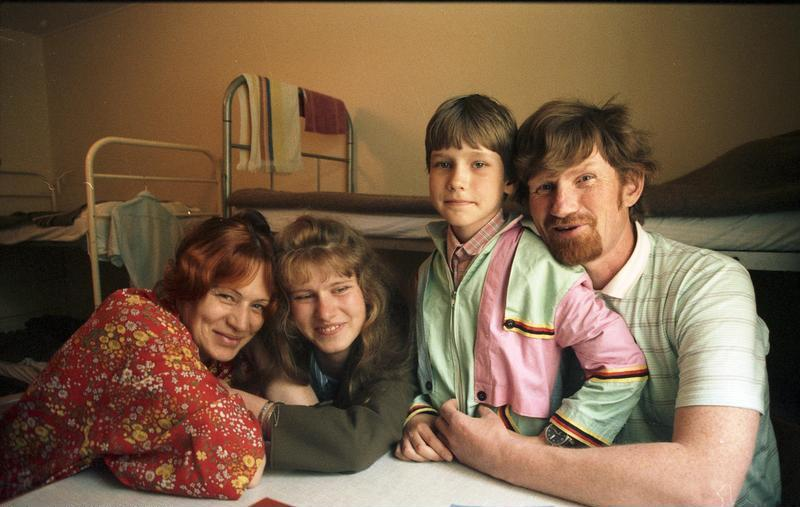
A family of so-called "Spätaussiedler" (repatriates of ethnic German origin), because the parents were born abroad they will be counted as "persons with immigrant background"

After World War II, 14 million ethnic Germans were expelled from the eastern territories of Germany and homelands outside the former German Empire. The accommodation and integration of these Heimatvertriebene in the remaining part of Germany, in which many cities and millions of apartments had been destroyed, was a major effort in the post-war occupation zones and later states of Germany.

Since the 1960s, ethnic Germans from the People's Republic of Poland and Soviet Union (especially from Kazakhstan, Russia, and Ukraine), have come to Germany. During the time of Perestroika, and after the dissolution of the Soviet Union, the number of immigrants increased heavily. Some of these immigrants are of mixed ancestry. During the 10-year period between 1987 and 2001, a total of 1,981,732 ethnic Germans from the FSU immigrated to Germany, along with more than a million of their non-German relatives. After 1997, however ethnic Slavs or those belonging to Slavic-Germanic mixed origins outnumbered those with only Germanic descent amongst the immigrants. The total number of people currently living in Germany having FSU connection is around 4 to 4.5 million (Including Germans, Slavs, Jews, and those of mixed origins), out of that more than 50% are of German descent.

Germany now has Europe's third-largest Jewish population. In 2004, twice as many Jews from former Soviet republics settled in Germany as in Israel, bringing the total inflow to more than 100,000 since 1991. Jews have a voice in German public life through the Central Council of Jews in Germany (Zentralrat der Juden in Deutschland). Some Jews from the former Soviet Union are of mixed heritage. Today, less than 0.1% of the total population of Germany is Jewish.

In 2019 there were also a growing number of at least 529,000 black Afro-Germans defined as people with an African migrant background. Out of them more than 400 thousand have a citizenship of a Subsahara-African country, with others being German citizens. Most of them live in Berlin and Hamburg. Numerous persons from northern African Tunisia and Morocco live in Germany. While they are considered members of a minority group, for the most part, they do not consider themselves "Afro-Germans", nor are most of them perceived as such by the German people. However, Germany does not keep any statistics regarding ethnicity or race. Hence, the exact number of Germans of African descent is unknown.

Germany's biggest East Asian minorities are the Chinese people in Germany, numbering 189,000 and Vietnamese people in Germany, numbering 188,000, many of whom living in Berlin and eastern Germany. Also there are about 35,000 Japanese citizens residing in Germany. There are also groups of South Asian and Southeast Asian immigrants. Around 163,000 Indians and 124,000 Pakistanis live in Germany. Additionally some 30,000 Filipino citizens and more than 20,000 Indonesian citizens reside in Germany.

Numerous descendants of the so-called Gastarbeiter live in Germany. The Gastarbeiter mostly came from Turkey, Italy, Greece, Spain, Morocco, Portugal, the former Yugoslavia, Tunisia and Chile. Also included were Vietnam, Mongolia, North Korea, Angola, Mozambique and Cuba when the former East Germany existed until reunification in 1990. The (socialist) German Democratic Republic (East Germany) however had their guest-workers stay in single-sex dormitories. Female guest workers had to sign contracts saying that they were not allowed to fall pregnant during their stay. If they fell pregnant nevertheless they faced forced abortion or deportation. This is one of the reasons why the vast majority of ethnic minorities today lives in western Germany and also one of the reasons why minorities such as the Vietnamese have the most unusual population pyramid, with nearly all second-generation Vietnamese Germans born after 1989.

Proportion of Germans without a migrant background (2016)

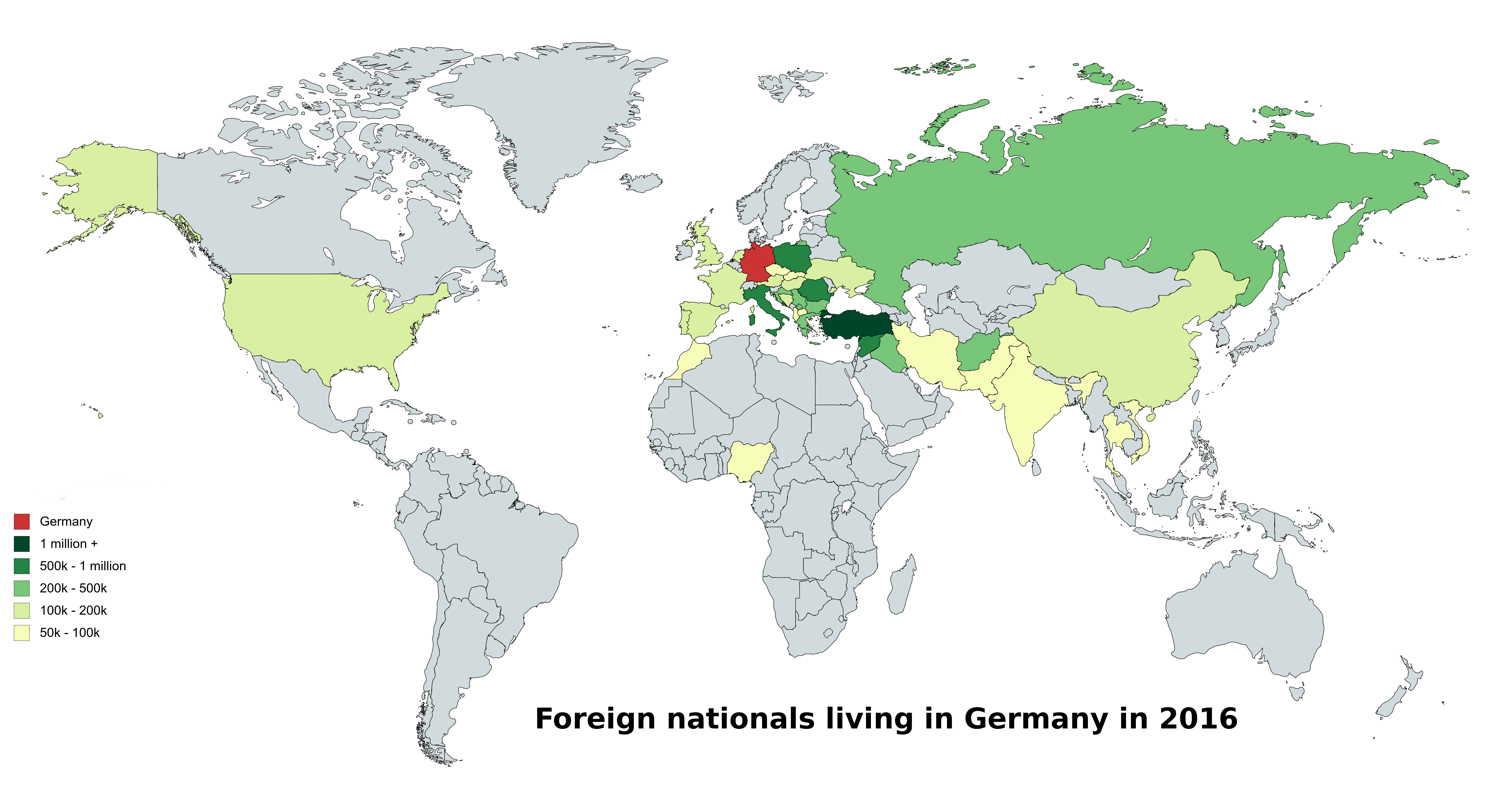
Germany is home to the second-largest number of international migrants worldwide. In 2016, around 23% of Germany's population do not hold a German passport or are descendants of immigrants.

== Foreign nationals in Germany ==
German and foreign national population pyramid of Germany in 2021

As the end of 2023, the most common groups of resident foreign nationals in Germany were as follows:

This list does not include non-ethnic Germans with German nationality, people with dual German/foreign citizenship and foreign nationals without resident status.

Rank	Nationality	Population		Change
Rank	Nationality	31 December 2024	31 December 2025	Change
	Total	14,061,640	14,070,225	8,585 ▲
1	Turkey	1,544,480	1,520,400	-24,080 ▼
2	Ukraine	1,334,005	1,409,565	75,560 ▲
3	Syria	975,060	936,285	-38,775 ▼
4	(European Union) Romania	909,755	903,770	-5,985 ▼
5	(European Union) Poland	864,980	839,660	-25,320 ▼
6	(European Union) Italy	636,730	629,405	-7,325 ▼
7	Afghanistan	442,020	449,780	7,760 ▲
8	(European Union) Bulgaria	432,080	421,895	-10,185 ▼
9	(European Union) Croatia	425,810	413,480	−8,707 ▼
10	(European Union) Greece	353,730	347,225	-6,505 ▼
11	Kosovo	313,615	323,260	9,645 ▲
12	India	277,455	311,130	33,675 ▲
13	Russia	302,315	284,225	-18,090 ▼
14	Serbia	262,790	262,345	-445 ▼
15	Iraq	268,785	254,065	-14,720 ▼
16	Bosnia and Herzegovina	249,730	245,960	-3,770 ▼
17	(European Union) Hungary	216,140	212,415	-3,725 ▼
18	(European Union) Spain	201,810	203,930	2,120 ▲
19	(European Union) Austria	181,510	180,315	-1,195 ▼
20	China	163,000	168,660	5,660 ▲
21	Iran	161,610	161,780	170 ▲
22	North Macedonia	158,995	161,120	2,125 ▲
23	Vietnam	137,560	151,980	14,420 ▲
24	(European Union) Netherlands	148,560	148,050	-510 ▼
25	(European Union) Portugal	140,185	139,940	-245 ▼
26	(European Union) France	138,250	137,650	-600 ▼
27	Albania	125,445	131,535	6,090 ▲
28	United States	120,385	118,130	-2,255 ▼
29	Morocco	102,925	109,105	6,180 ▲
30	Pakistan	96,920	102,615	5,695 ▲

== Population density and distribution ==
Population density by municipality

With an estimated 83.2 million inhabitants in December 2020, Germany is the second-most populous country in Europe after Russia, and ranks as the 19th largest country in the world in terms of population. Its population density stands at 233 inhabitants per square kilometer.

=== States ===
Germany comprises sixteen states that are collectively referred to as Länder. Due to differences in size and population the subdivision of these states varies, especially between city-states (Stadtstaaten) and states with larger territories (Flächenländer). For regional administrative purposes four states, namely Baden-Württemberg, Bavaria, Hesse and North Rhine-Westphalia, consist of a total of 19 Government Districts (Regierungsbezirke). As of 2019 Germany is divided into 400 districts (Kreise) at municipal level; these consist of 294 rural districts and 106 urban districts.

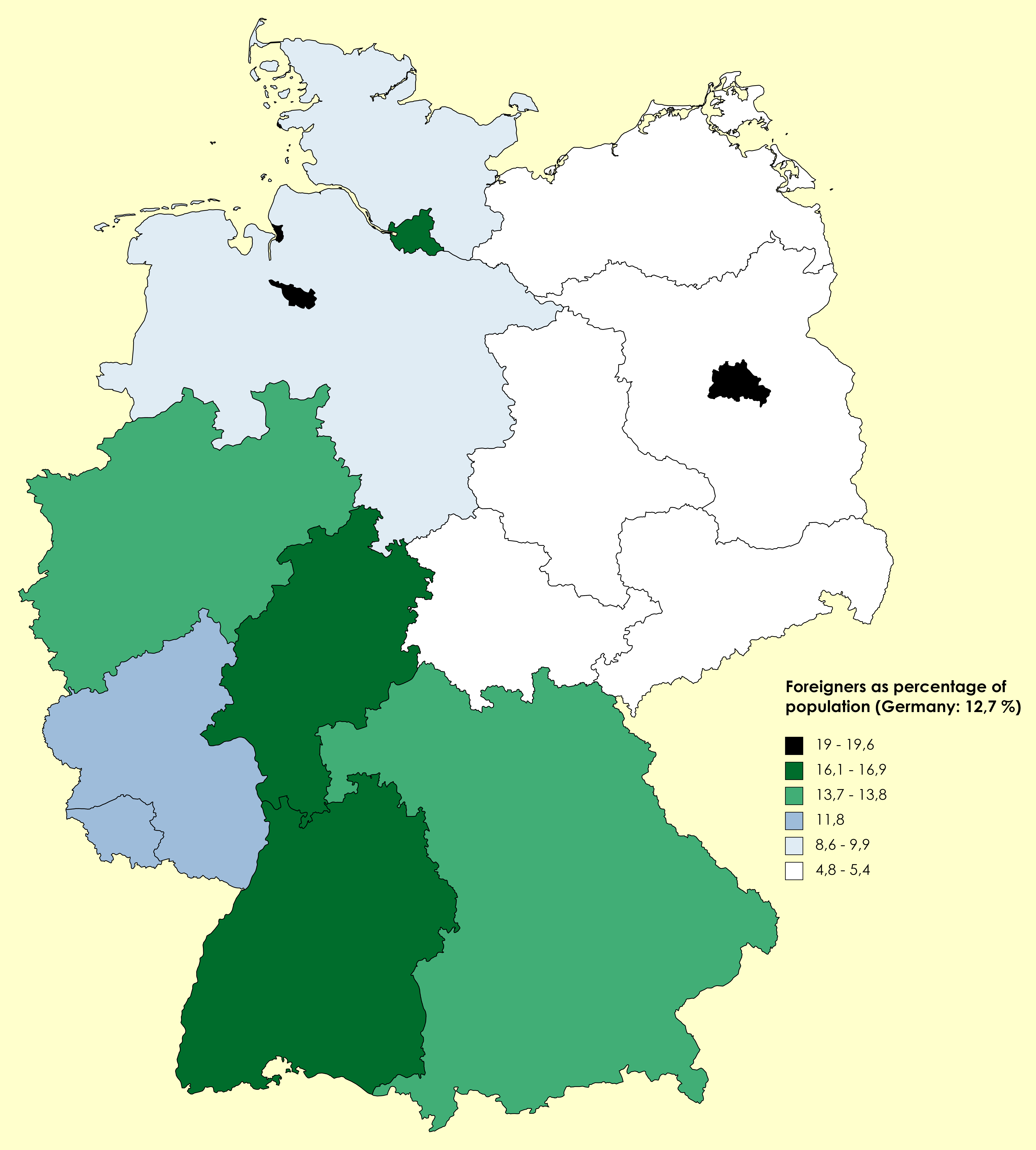
Germany states by foreigners as percentage of population as of November 2020

Population density by state
State	Capital	Area (km^{2})	Population (31 Dec 2022)	Foreigners	Population density (per km^{2})
North Rhine-Westphalia	Düsseldorf	34,112	18,139,116 ▲	2,828,367 ▲	532
Bavaria	Munich	70,541	13,369,116 ▲	2,073,494 ▲	190
Baden-Württemberg	Stuttgart	35,748	11,280,257 ▲	2,012,237 ▲	316
Lower Saxony	Hanover	47,709	8,140,242 ▲	959,786 ▲	171
Hesse	Wiesbaden	21,116	6,391,360 ▲	1,199,775 ▲	303
Rhineland-Palatinate	Mainz	19,858	4,159,150 ▲	566,026 ▲	209
Saxony	Dresden	18,450	4,086,152 ▲	300,164 ▲	221
Berlin	Berlin	891	3,755,251 ▲	834,349 ▲	4,215
Schleswig-Holstein	Kiel	15,804	2,953,270 ▲	299,787 ▲	187
Brandenburg	Potsdam	29,654	2,573,135 ▲	179,872 ▲	87
Saxony-Anhalt	Magdeburg	20,454	2,186,643 ▲	160,990 ▲	107
Thuringia	Erfurt	16,202	2,126,846 ▲	161,291 ▲	131
Hamburg	Hamburg	755	1,892,122 ▲	363,283 ▲	2,506
Mecklenburg-Vorpommern	Schwerin	23,295	1,628,378 ▲	105,437 ▲	70
Saarland	Saarbrücken	2,571	992,666 ▲	139,189 ▲	386
Bremen	Bremen	419	684,864 ▲	144,148 ▲	1,634
Germany	Berlin	357,582	84,358,845 ▲	12,324,195 ▲	236

=== Urbanization ===
Germany officially has eleven metropolitan regions. In 2005, Germany had 82 cities with more than 100,000 inhabitants.

Selected urban regions
Metropolitan region	Location	Description	Approx. population (millions)	Large minority groups
Rhine-Ruhr		The metropolitan area is part of the pan-European Blue Banana mega region and is a significant industrial and commercial hub, home to many of Germany's biggest corporations and contributing as much as 15% to the German GDP. Included in the rather polycentric conurbation are the cities of Cologne, Düsseldorf, Bonn, Dortmund and Essen served by two of the country's largest airports: Düsseldorf Airport and the Cologne Bonn Airport. Particularly among young Germans, Cologne and Düsseldorf are known for their nightlife and open-minded atmosphere.	10	Turks, Poles, Italians, Romanians, Africans, Arabs, Greeks, Dutch, Russians, Serbs, Bulgarians and Spaniards
Berlin/Brandenburg		Berlin is the capital and largest city. It lies in the eastern part of the country, completely surrounded by the rather sparsely populated state of Brandenburg. Berlin is regarded as one of Europe's most open, vibrant and ever changing capitals. The city is arguably the most diverse city in Germany regarding culture and ethnicity. Regarded as an economically weak region of Germany for a long time, it is now transforming itself into the entrepreneurial center of Europe. Dubbed the "Silicon Allee" by insiders of the tech industry, Berlin is home to countless startup companies and is one of Germany's densest knowledge hubs, with four public universities and countless research centers.	6	Turks, Russians, Poles, Africans, Italians, Americans, Vietnamese, Serbs, Arabs, Bulgarians, Romanians, French and Spaniards
Munich		The metropolitan area in and around Munich has one of Germany's highest standards of living. Housing some of the country's largest car and machine companies, it is known for its economic strength mixed with the uniqueness of Bavarian culture, taking up almost the entirety of southern Bavaria. It is the closest metropolitan area to the Alps.	5.7	Turks, Albanians, Croats, Italians, Poles, Greeks, Austrians, Romanians, Arabs, Africans and Serbs
Rhine-Main		Frankfurt is a financial and commercial center both for Germany and continental Europe. Almost all of Germany's big banks and the ECB have their headquarters located inside the city of Frankfurt. Despite its population of under 1 million, it is Germany's only city with a large, visible cluster of skyscrapers. The city is one of Europe's biggest transit hubs, with Europe's 6th busiest airport (Frankfurt airport), Germany's second-busiest railway station and one of the EU's most heavily used motorway interchanges.	5.5	Turks, Poles, Italians, African, Croats, Romanians, Greeks, Serbs, Spaniards, Americans, Chinese, Arabs and Indians
Hamburg		Hamburg is the country's second largest city and the biggest Hanseatic city in Europe. It is Europe's 3rd busiest container port with just under 9 million TEUs annually. The city is proud of its diverse nightlife and music scene centered in and around the famous St. Pauli district.	5.3	Turks, Albanians, Poles, African, Portuguese, Romanians, Russians, Italians and Spaniards
Stuttgart		Stuttgart has a reputation for research, inventions and industry. The German headquarters of many international enterprises are in Stuttgart. This contrasts with the strong rural, down-to-earth attitude of the Stuttgarters of all classes. A popular slogan is "We are good at everything. Except speaking High (standard) German."	5.2	Turks, Albanians, Greeks, Dutch, Italians, Croats, Serbs, French, Chinese, Romanians, Americans and Spaniards.
Hannover–Braunschweig–Göttingen–Wolfsburg		The relatively urban south of Lower Saxony, located on route between the Ruhr area and Berlin, and the route from Hamburg to the south, has been important for logistics, industry, but has also developed a strong standing in the service industries.	3.7	Turks, Kurds (especially around Celle), Serbs, Ukrainians, Greeks, Russians, Italians (especially in Wolfsburg) and Spanish (Especially in Hanover).
Bremen/Oldenburg		Located in the northwestern part of Germany, the main axis contains the cities of Bremen, Delmenhorst and Oldenburg, with the cities of Wilhelmshaven and Bremerhaven being the northern corners on or connected to the North Sea. Major rural areas are covered in between these cities. There is a smooth transition to the Hamburg metropolitan area to the east.	2.7	Turks, Russians, Albanians, Serbs, Portuguese, Iranians, Dutch, Americans and Britons.
Central German Metropolitan Region		The economic region stretches across three federal states. The major city is Leipzig in Saxony; other important cities are Halle/Saale, Gera and Jena. The region is known for its universities and research, for its trade fairs and conventions, as a central distribution hub (Leipzig-Halle-Airport), as a center for chemical and industrial production, for the well preserved inner cities and for the developed classical and alternative cultural scene. Leipzig is one of the fastest-growing cities in Germany, with a rising economy.	2.4	Russians, Poles, Vietnamese, Italians, Romanians, Ukrainians, Chinese, Turks, Portuguese, people from Syria, from Kazakhstan and from Afghanistan.

== Immigration ==
The United Nations Population Fund lists Germany as host to the third-highest number of international migrants worldwide, behind the United States and Saudi Arabia. The largest ethnic group of non-German origin are the Turkish. Since the 1960s, West and later reunified Germany has attracted immigrants primarily from Southern and Eastern Europe as well as Turkey, many of whom (or their children) have acquired German citizenship over time. While most of these immigrants initially arrived as guest workers, changes to guest worker legislation allowed many to stay and to build lives in Germany.

Germany had signed special visa agreements with several countries in times of severe labour shortages or when particular skills were deficient within the country. During the 1960s and 1970s, agreements were signed with the governments of Turkey, Yugoslavia, Italy and Spain to help Germany overcome its severe labour shortage.

As of 2012, after Germany fully legalized visa-free immigrants from the eastern states of the EU, the largest sources of net immigration to Germany were other European countries, most importantly Poland, Romania, Bulgaria, Hungary, Italy, Spain, and Greece; notably, in the case of Turkey, German Turks moving to Turkey slightly outnumbered new immigrants in 2012, however, in recent years there are more Turkish immigrants in Germany than emigrants again, including illegal Turkish migrants.

In 2015, there was a large increase in asylum applications following the 2015 refugee crisis, mainly due to the violent conflicts in Syria, Iraq and Afghanistan: 476,649 asylum applications were counted that year. This number went up to even 745,545 in 2016 and began to decline after it.

In 2022, some 23.8 million people in Germany, or 28.7% of the population have migrant background.

Following the 2022 Russian invasion of Ukraine, over 1.06 million refugees from Ukraine were recorded in Germany as of April 2023.

=== Migration between Germany and foreign countries, 1950 to 2025 ===
Numbers of migrants
Year	Total			Germans			Non-Germans		
Year	Arrivals	Departures	Net migration	Arrivals	Departures	Net migration	Arrivals	Departures	Net migration
1950	96,140	78,148	17,992	–	–	–	–	–	–
1951	88,349	126,071	−37,722	–	–	–	–	–	–
1952	88,089	135,796	−47,707	–	–	–	–	–	–
1953	101,599	122,264	−20,665	–	–	–	–	–	–
1954	111,490	136,212	−24,722	64,637	107,381	−42,744	46,853	28,831	18,022
1955	127,921	136,977	−9,056	67,553	101,429	−33,876	60,368	35,548	24,820
1956	159,086	168,101	−9,015	76,581	119,880	−43,299	82,505	48,221	34,284
1957	200,142	173,171	26,971	92,724	113,879	−21,155	107,418	59,292	48,126
1958	212,520	161,865	50,655	94,238	97,854	−3,616	118,282	64,011	54,271
1959	227,600	178,864	48,736	81,681	98,234	−16,553	145,919	80,630	65,289
1960	395,016	218,574	176,442	77,331	94,133	−16,802	317,685	124,441	193,244
1961	489,423	266,536	222,887	78,354	85,012	−6,658	411,069	181,524	229,545
1962	566,465	326,339	240,126	71,984	78,657	−6,673	494,481	247,682	246,799
1963	576,951	426,767	150,184	71,188	78,645	−7,457	505,763	348,122	157,641
1964	698,609	457,767	240,842	73,125	86,319	−13,194	625,484	371,448	254,036
1965	791,737	489,503	302,234	75,580	76,799	−1,219	716,157	412,704	303,453
1966	702,337	608,775	93,562	69,841	73,540	−3,699	632,496	535,235	97,261
1967	398,403	604,211	−205,808	68,105	76,317	−8,212	330,298	527,894	−197,596
1968	657,513	404,301	253,212	67,951	71,676	−3,725	589,562	332,625	256,937
1969	980,731	436,685	544,046	71,165	68,021	3,144	909,566	368,664	540,902
1970	1,042,760	495,675	547,085	66,528	61,023	5,505	976,232	434,652	541,580
1971	936,349	554,280	382,069	65,612	54,022	11,590	870,737	500,258	370,479
1972	852,549	568,610	283,939	65,387	54,164	11,223	787,162	514,446	272,716
1973	932,583	580,019	352,564	63,474	53,208	10,266	869,109	526,811	342,298
1974	601,013	635,613	−34,600	62,439	55,168	7,271	538,574	580,445	−41,871
1975	429,064	652,966	−223,902	62,969	52,861	10,108	366,095	600,105	−234,010
1976	476,286	569,133	−92,847	88,983	53,695	35,288	387,303	515,438	−128,135
1977	522,611	505,696	16,915	99,766	53,603	46,163	422,845	452,093	−29,248
1978	559,620	458,769	100,851	103,503	53,016	50,487	456,117	405,753	50,364
1979	649,832	419,091	230,741	104,645	53,083	51,562	545,187	366,008	179,179
1980	736,362	439,571	296,791	104,928	53,728	51,200	631,434	385,843	245,591
1981	605,629	470,525	135,104	104,491	55,001	49,490	501,138	415,524	85,614
1982	404,019	493,495	−89,476	82,337	60,227	22,110	321,682	433,268	−111,586
1983	354,496	487,268	−132,772	81,244	62,355	18,889	273,252	424,913	−151,661
1984	410,387	604,832	−194,445	79,247	59,764	19,483	331,140	545,068	−213,928
1985	480,872	425,313	55,559	82,653	58,607	24,046	398,219	366,706	31,513
1986	567,215	407,139	160,076	88,867	59,350	29,517	478,348	347,789	130,559
1987	591,765	398,518	193,247	119,429	64,534	54,895	472,336	333,984	138,352
1988	860,578	419,439	441,139	213,044	60,498	152,546	647,534	358,941	288,593
1989	1,133,794	539,832	593,962	366,849	101,750	265,099	766,945	438,082	328,863
1990	1,256,250	574,378	681,872	420,548	108,908	311,640	835,702	465,470	370,232
1991	1,198,978	596,455	602,523	273,633	98,915	174,718	925,345	497,540	427,805
1992	1,502,198	720,127	782,071	290,850	105,171	185,679	1,211,348	614,956	596,392
1993	1,277,408	815,312	462,096	287,561	104,653	182,908	989,847	710,659	279,188
1994	1,082,553	767,555	314,998	305,037	138,280	166,757	777,516	629,275	148,241
1995	1,096,048	698,113	397,935	303,347	130,672	172,675	792,701	567,441	225,260
1996	959,691	677,494	282,197	251,737	118,430	133,307	707,954	559,064	148,890
1997	840,633	746,969	93,664	225,335	109,903	115,432	615,298	637,066	−21,768
1998	802,456	755,358	47,098	196,956	116,403	80,553	605,500	638,955	−33,455
1999	874,023	672,048	201,975	200,150	116,410	83,740	673,873	555,638	118,235
2000	841,158	674,038	167,120	191,909	111,244	80,665	649,249	562,794	86,455
2001	879,217	606,494	272,723	193,958	109,507	84,451	685,259	496,987	188,272
2002	842,543	623,255	219,288	184,202	117,683	66,519	658,341	505,572	152,769
2003	768,975	626,330	142,645	167,216	127,267	39,949	601,759	499,063	102,696
2004	780,175	697,632	82,543	177,993	150,667	27,326	602,182	546,965	55,217
2005	707,352	628,399	78,953	128,051	144,815	−16,764	579,301	483,584	95,717
2006	661,855	639,064	22,791	103,388	155,290	−51,902	558,467	483,774	74,693
2007	680,766	636,854	43,912	106,014	161,105	−55,091	574,752	475,749	99,003
2008	682,146	737,889	−55,743	108,331	174,759	−66,428	573,815	563,130	10,685
2009	721,014	733,796	−12,782	114,700	154,988	−40,288	606,314	578,808	27,506
2010	798,282	670,605	127,677	114,752	141,000	−26,248	683,530	529,605	153,925
2011	958,299	678,969	279,330	116,604	140,132	−23,528	841,695	538,837	302,858
2012	1,080,936	711,991	368,945	115,028	133,232	−18,204	965,908	578,759	387,149
2013	1,226,493	797,886	428,607	118,425	140,282	−21,857	1,108,068	657,604	450,464
2014	1,464,724	914,241	550,483	122,195	148,636	−26,441	1,342,529	765,605	576,924
2015	2,136,954	997,552	1,139,402	120,713	138,273	−17,560	2,016,241	859,279	1,156,962
2016	1,865,122	1,365,178	499,944	146,047	281,411	−135,364	1,719,075	1,083,767	635,308
2017	1,550,721	1,134,641	416,080	166,703	249,181	−82,478	1,384,018	885,460	498,558
2018	1,585,112	1,185,432	399,680	201,531	261,851	−60,320	1,383,581	923,581	460,000
2019	1,558,612	1,231,552	327,060	212,669	270,294	−57,625	1,345,943	961,258	384,685
2020	1,186,702	966,451	220,251	191,883	220,239	−28,356	994,819	746,212	248,607
2021	1,323,466	994,303	329,163	183,650	247,829	−64,179	1,139,816	746,474	393,342
2022	2,665,772	1,203,683	1,462,089	184,753	268,167	−83,414	2,481,019	935,516	1,545,503
2023	1,936,754	1,284,570	652,184	191,270	270,598	−79,328	1,745,484	1,013,972	731,512
2024	1,697,192	1,278,425	418,767	188,982	276,161	−87,179	1,508,210	1,002,264	505,946
2025	1,481,299	1,259,258	222,041	191,741	295,193	−103,452	1,289,558	964,066	325,492

== Education ==
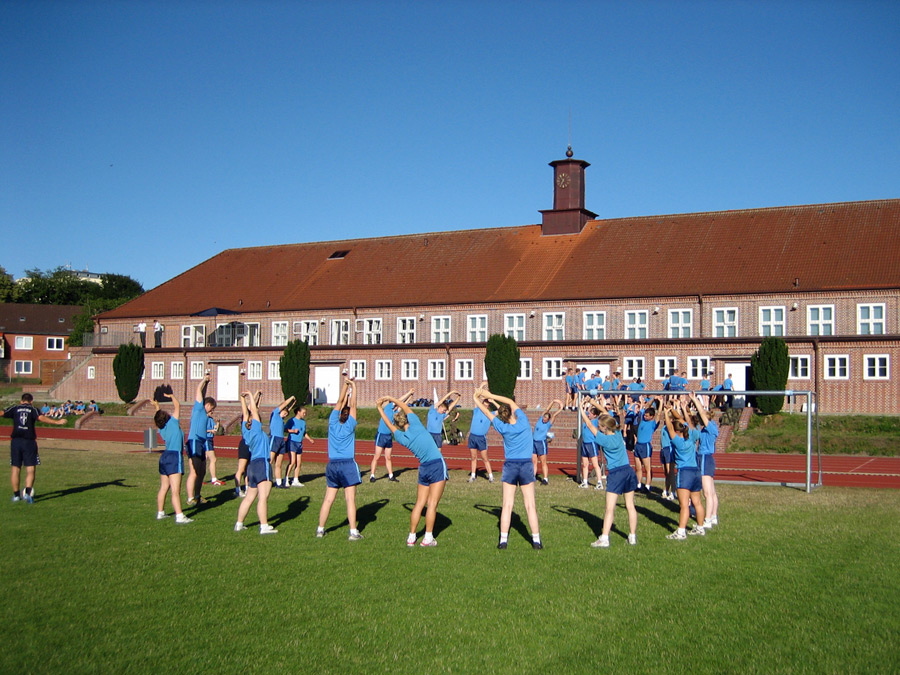
Cadets of the German Navy exercising in front of one of the gyms of Germany's naval officers school, the Marineschule Mürwik

Responsibility for educational oversight in Germany lies primarily with the individual federated states. Since the 1960s, a reform movement has attempted to unify secondary education into a Gesamtschule (comprehensive school); several West German states later simplified their school systems to two or three tiers. A system of apprenticeship called Duale Ausbildung ("dual education") allows pupils in vocational training to learn in a company as well as in a state-run vocational school.

Optional kindergarten education is provided for all children between three and six years old, after which school attendance is compulsory for at least nine years, depending on the state. Primary education usually lasts for four years and public schools are not stratified at this stage. In contrast, secondary education includes three traditional types of schools focused on different levels of academic ability: the Gymnasium enrols the most academically promising children and prepares students for university studies; the Realschule for intermediate students lasts six years; the Hauptschule prepares pupils for vocational education.

In addition Germany has a comprehensive school known as the Gesamtschule. While some German schools such as the Gymnasium and the Realschule have rather strict entrance requirements, the Gesamtschule does not have such requirements. They offer college preparatory classes for the students who are doing well, general education classes for average students, and remedial courses for those who aren't doing that well. In most cases students attending a Gesamtschule may graduate with the Hauptschulabschluss, the Realschulabschluss or the Abitur depending on how well they did in school. The percentage of students attending a Gesamtschule varies by Bundesland. In 2007 the State of Brandenburg more than 50% of all students attended a Gesamtschule, while in the State of Bavaria less than 1% did.

The general entrance requirement for university is Abitur, a qualification normally based on continuous assessment during the last few years at school and final examinations; however there are a number of exceptions, and precise requirements vary, depending on the state, the university and the subject. Germany's universities are recognised internationally; in the Academic Ranking of World Universities (ARWU) for 2008, six of the top 100 universities in the world are in Germany, and 18 of the top 200. Nearly all German universities are public institutions, tuition fees in the range of €500 were introduced in some states after 2006, but quickly abolished again until 2014.

Percentage of jobholders holding Hauptschulabschluss, Realschulabschluss or Abitur in Germany
Year	Hauptschulabschluss	Realschulabschluss	Abitur
1970	87.7%	10.9%	1.4%
1982	79.3%	17.7%	3%
1991	66.5%	27%	6.5%
2000	54.9%	34.1%	11%

=== Literacy ===
Over 99% of those of age 15 and above are estimated to be able to read and write. However, a growing number of inhabitants are functionally illiterate. The young are much more likely to be functionally illiterate than the old. According to a study done by the University of Bremen in cooperation with the "Bundesverband Alphabetisierung e.V.", 10% of youngsters living in Germany are functionally illiterate and one quarter are able to understand only basic level texts. Illiteracy rates of youngsters vary by ethnic group and parents' socioeconomic class.

== Health ==
The life expectancy in Germany is 81.1 years (78.7 years males, 83.6 years females, 2020 est.). As of 2024, the principal cause of death was cardiovascular disease, at 33.7%, followed by malignant tumours, at 23.7%. As of 2008, about 82,000 Germans had been infected with HIV/AIDS and 26,000 had died from the disease (cumulatively, since 1982). According to a 2005 survey, 27% of German adults are smokers. A 2009 study shows Germany is near the median in terms of overweight and obese people in Europe.

== Religion ==
2020 map of Christian denominations in the states of Germany Roman Catholic majority Christian majority, Catholic plurality Christian majority, EKD plurality Christians less than 50% of population, majority of Christians belong to EKD

The national constitutions of 1919 and 1949 guarantee freedom of faith and religion; earlier, these freedoms were mentioned only in state constitutions. The modern constitution of 1949 also states that no one may be discriminated against due to their faith or religious opinions. A state church does not exist in Germany (see Freedom of religion in Germany).

According to a 1990s poll by Der Spiegel, 45% of Germans believe in God, and a quarter in Jesus Christ. According to the Eurobarometer Poll 2010, 44% of German citizens responded that "they believe there is a God", 25% responded that "they believe there is some sort of spirit or life force" and 27% responded that "they don't believe there is any sort of spirit, God or life force". 4% gave no response.

Since the reunification of Germany, the number of non-religious people has grown and an estimated 48,1% of the country's population are not affiliated with any church or religion.

Christianity is the largest religion in Germany, comprising 46,3% of the country's population. The two largest churches, the Roman Catholic Church and the Protestant Church in Germany (EKD), have lost significant number of adherents. In 2025 the Catholic Church accounted for 23,0% and the Evangelical Church for 20.8% of the population. Orthodox Church has 1.5% and other Christian churches and groups summed up to 1,0% of the population.

Muslims made 4,0% and Alevism 0,8% ot the population. Smaller religious groups include Buddhism (0,2%), Judaism (0,1%), Hinduism (0,1%), Sikhism (0,1%) and Yazidis (0,1%). Rest of the minor religious communities in Germany made together 0,3% of the population and have separately fewer than 0.1% adherents.

Religion in Germany (2025)
No religion	48.1%
Roman Catholicism	23.0%
Protestant Church	20.8%
Islam (excluding Alevism)	4.0%
Orthodox Church	1.5%
Other Christians	1.0%
Alevism	0.8%
Buddhism	0.2%
Judaism	0.1%
Hinduism	0.1%
Yazidism	0.1%
Other Religions	0.3%

Protestantism is concentrated in the north and east and Roman Catholicism is concentrated in the south and west. According to the last nationwide census, Protestantism is more widespread among the population with German citizenship; there are slightly more Catholics total because of the Catholic immigrant population (including such groups as Poles and Italians). The former Pope, Benedict XVI, was born in Bavaria. Non-religious people, including atheists and agnostics are especially numerous in the former East Germany and major metropolitan areas.

Of the roughly 4 million Muslims, most are Sunnis and Alevites from Turkey, but there are a small number of Shi'ites and other denominations. 1.5% of the country's overall population declare themselves Orthodox Christians, with Serbs, Greeks, Romanians, Ukrainians and Russians being the most numerous. Germany has Europe's third-largest Jewish population (after France and the United Kingdom). In 2004, twice as many Jews from former Soviet republics settled in Germany as in Israel, bringing the total Jewish population to more than 200,000, compared to 30,000 prior to German reunification. Large cities with significant Jewish populations include Berlin, Frankfurt and Munich. Around 250,000 active Buddhists live in Germany; 50% of them are Asian immigrants.

=== 2011 Census ===
Religion (2011 German Census)
1. Catholic Church (30.8%)
2. EKD (30.3%)
3. Other, atheist or unspecified (38.9%)

Census results were as follows:

- Roman Catholic Church: 24,740,380 or 30.8% of the German population;
- Protestant Church: 24,328,100 or 30.3% of the German population;
- Other, atheist or not specified (including Protestants outside EKD): 31,151,210 or 38.9% of the German population.

== Languages ==
German is the only official and most widely spoken language. Standard German is understood throughout the country.

=== Microcensus data ===
Since 2017, the Federal Statistical Office of Germany included a new question regarding the language spoken at home in the micro-census, a large sample survey that yearly covers approximately 1% of the German population living in private households. In recent years, there has been a noticeable decline in the number and proportion of people in Germany who speak only German at home, accompanied by a corresponding increase in the use of other languages or multilingual households. This can be attributed to the increasing size of the Germans with a migration background and the decreasing size of the population without a migration background.

Trends in languages spoken at home (2021–2024)
Year	Total population		Only German		Mostly German		Mostly another language	
Year	Absolute	%	Absolute	%	Absolute	%	Absolute	%
2021	81,035,000	100.00	65,420,000	80.73	3,775,000	4.66	11,840,000	14.61
2022	81,852,000	100.00	64,984,000	79.39	4,026,000	4.92	12,842,000	15.69
2023	82,472,000	100.00	64,000,000	77.60	3,635,000	4.41	14,837,000	17.99
2024	82,769,000	100.00	63,554,000	76.78	3,776,000	4.56	15,439,000	18.65

The following table provides the results of the 2024 microcensus, using 2022 census data as the basis for the projection, regarding the languages spoken at home. After German (81.34%), the most spoken languages were Turkish (2.61%), Russian (2.27%), Arabic (1.70%), English (1.26%) and Polish (1.19%), each with more than one million people speaking them in their homes.

Languages spoken at home, 2024 microcensus
Language	Absolute number	Percentage
Albanian	601,000	0.73%
Arabic	1,407,000	1.70%
Bosnian	246,000	0.30%
Bulgarian	227,000	0.27%
Chinese	159,000	0.19%
Danish	22,000	0.03%
English	1,047,000	1.26%
French	194,000	0.23%
Greek	308,000	0.37%
Hindi	87,000	0.11%
Italian	481,000	0.58%
Croatian	377,000	0.46%
Kurdish	575,000	0.69%
Macedonian	90,000	0.11%
Dutch	90,000	0.11%
Pashto	58,000	0.07%
Persian	428,000	0.52%
Polish	983,000	1.19%
Portuguese	182,000	0.22%
Romanian	750,000	0.91%
Russian	1,877,000	2.27%
Serbian	262,000	0.32%
Spanish	354,000	0.43%
Turkish	2,162,000	2.61%
Ukrainian	711,000	0.86%
Hungarian	199,000	0.24%
Urdu	104,000	0.13%
Tamil	60,000	0.12%
Vietnamese	159,000	0.19%
Overall
Total population	82,769,000	100.00%
Only German	63,554,000	76.78%
Mostly German	3,776,000	4.56%
Mostly another language	15,439,000	18.65%
Another European language	243,000	0.29%
Another African language	260,000	0.31%
Another Asian language	442,000	0.53%
Another language	352,000	0.43%

=== Minority languages ===
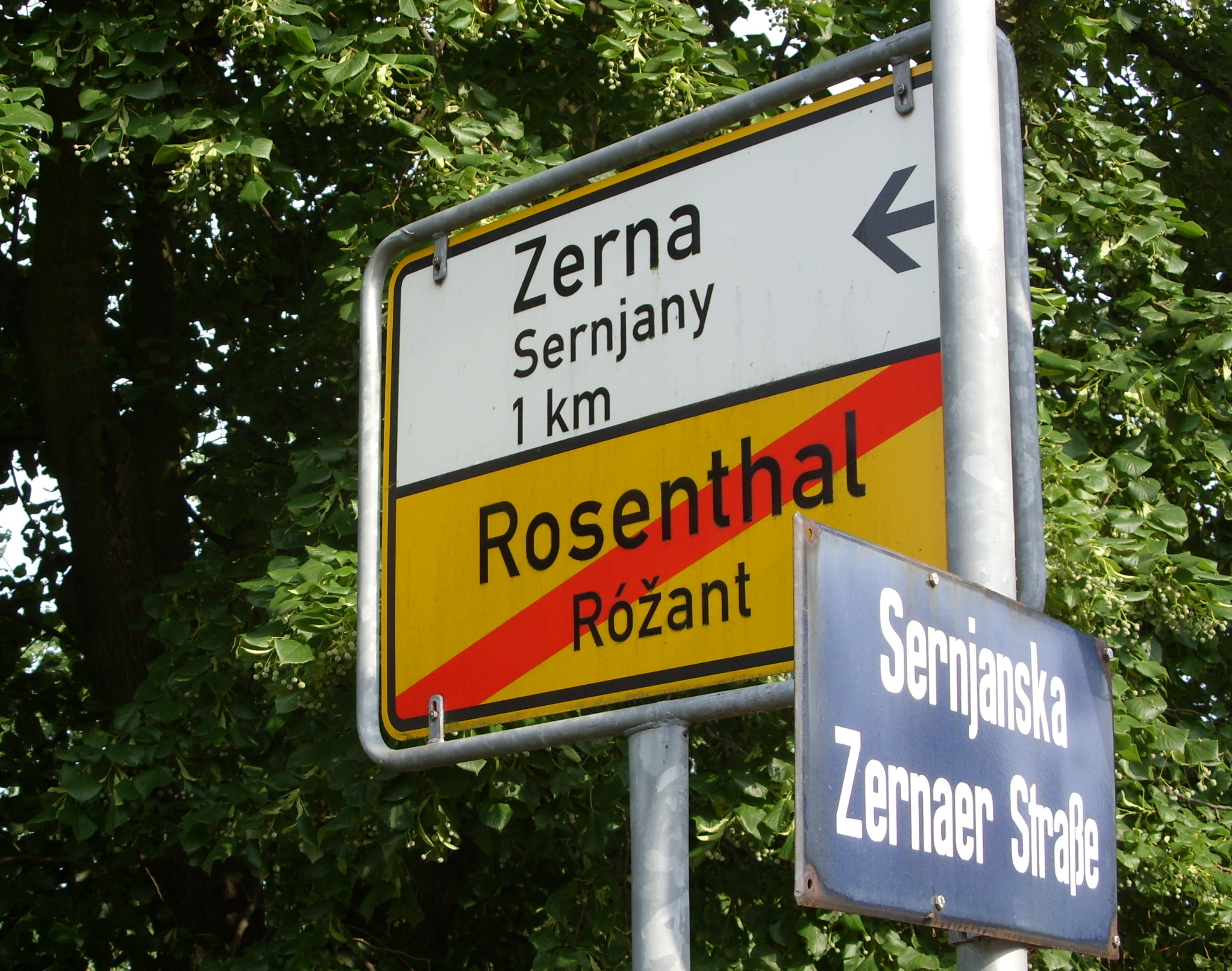
Bilingual German–Sorbian city limit signs

Danish, Low German, Low Rhenish, the Sorbian languages (Lower Sorbian and Upper Sorbian), and the two Frisian languages, Saterfrisian and North Frisian, are officially recognized and protected as minority languages by the European Charter for Regional or Minority Languages in their respective regions. With speakers of Romany living in all parts of Germany, the federal government has promised to take action to protect the language. Until now, only Hesse has followed Berlin's announcement, and agreed on implementing concrete measures to support Romany speakers.

Germany is a strong supporter of the Charter, as evidenced by things like the 2022 report from the Secretary General of the Council of Europe specifically naming Germany as an example of how to incorporate minority languages in State media. Still, Germany—like many other signatories of the Charter—has room for improvement in its implementation of the Charter.

Protected minority languages in Germany
Language	States
Danish	Schleswig-Holstein
North Frisian	Schleswig-Holstein
Saterland Frisian	Lower Saxony
Low German	Brandenburg, Bremen, Hamburg, Mecklenburg-Vorpommern, Lower Saxony, Saxony-Anhalt, Schleswig-Holstein, North Rhine-Westphalia
Low Rhenish	North Rhine-Westphalia
Upper Sorbian	Saxony
Lower Sorbian	Brandenburg
Romany	Hesse de facto, de jure in all states (see text)

=== High German dialects ===
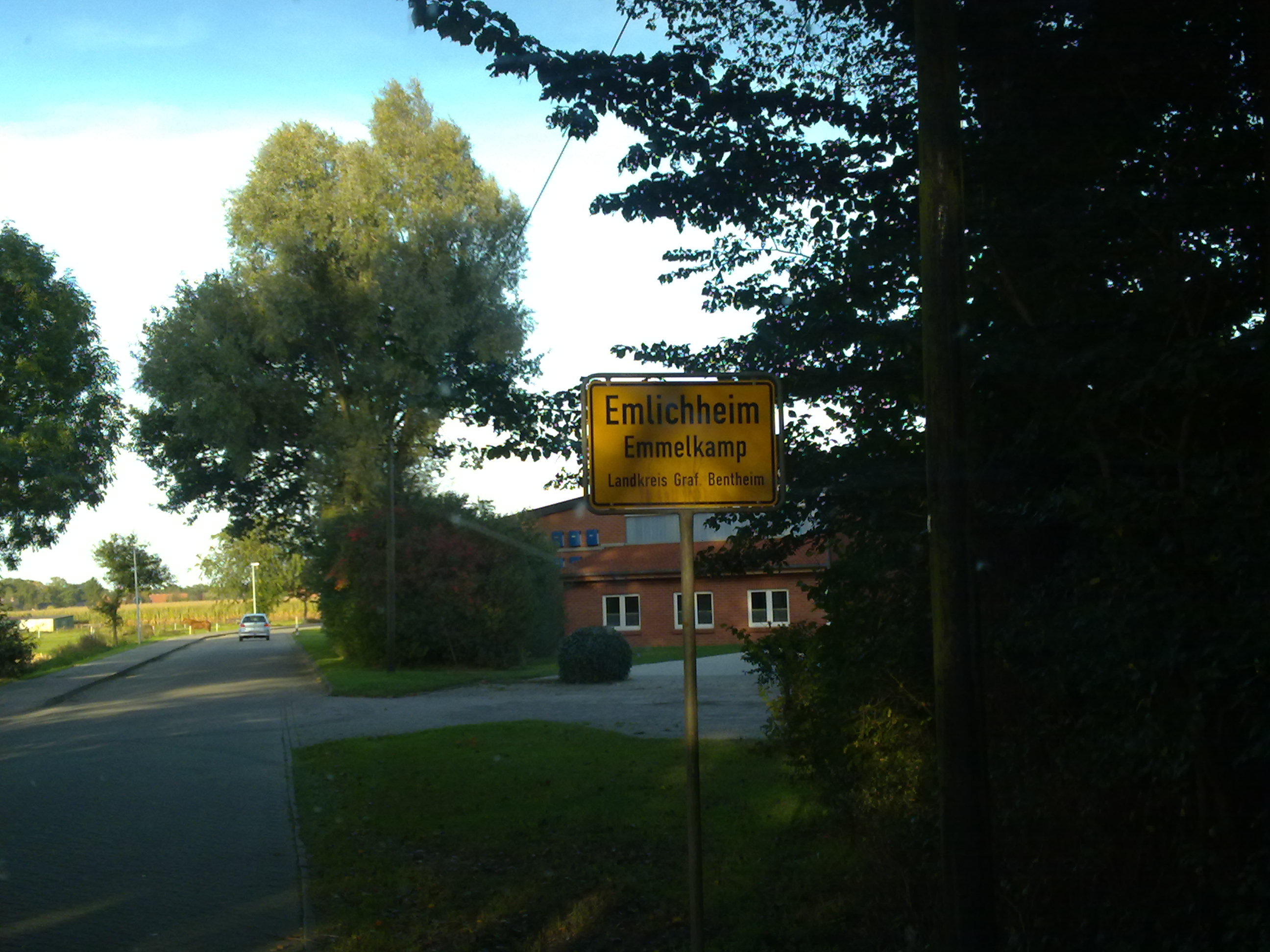
City limits sign; this city is called Emlichheim in High German and Emmelkamp in Low German.

German dialects – some quite distinct from the standard language – are used in everyday speech, especially in rural regions. Many dialects, for example the Upper German varieties, are to some degree cultivated as symbols of regional identity and have their own literature, theaters and some TV programming. While speaking a dialect outside its native region might be frowned upon, in their native regions some dialects can be spoken by all social classes. Nevertheless, partly due to the prevalence of Standard German in media, the use of dialects has declined over the past century, especially in the younger population.

The social status of different German dialects can vary greatly. The Alemannic and Bavarian dialects of the south are positively valued by their speakers and can be used in almost all social circumstances. The Saxonian and Thuringian dialects have less prestige and are subject to derision. While Bavarian and Alemannic have kept much of their distinctiveness, the Middle German dialects, which are closer to Standard German, have lost some of their distinctive lexical and grammatical features and tend to be only pronunciation variants of Standard German.

=== Low Saxon dialects ===
Although Low Saxon is officially recognized as a language on its own, little official action has been taken to foster the language. Historically one third of Germany's territory and population was Low Saxon speaking. No data has ever been collected on the actual number of speakers, but today the number of speakers is around 5 million. Despite this relatively high number of speakers there is very little coverage in the media (mostly on NDR TV, no regular programming) and very little education in or on the language. The language is not fixed as part of the school curriculum, and Low Saxon is used as a medium of instruction in only one school in the whole of Germany (as a "model project" in primary school alongside education in Standard German). As a consequence the younger generation refused to adopt the native language of their parents. Language prevalence dropped from more than 90% (depending on the exact region) in the 1930s to less than 5% today. This accounts for a massive intergenerational gap in language use. Older people regularly use the language and take private initiatives to maintain the language, but the lack of innovative potential of the younger generation hinders language maintenance. The language also has its own literature (around 150 published books every year) and there are many theatres (mostly amateur dramatics, but some professional ones, such as Ohnsorg-Theater).

Use of Low Saxon is mainly restricted to use among acquaintances, such as family members, neighbours and friends. A meeting of a village council can be held almost completely in Low Saxon if all participants know each other (as long as written protocols are written in Standard German), but a single foreigner can make the whole meeting switch to Standard German.

The Low Saxon dialects differ in their status too. There is a north–south gradient in language maintenance. The southern dialects of Westfalian, Eastfalian and Brandenburgish have had much stronger speaker losses than the northern coastal dialects of Northern Low Saxon. While Eastfalian has lost speakers to Standard German, Westfalian has lost speakers both to Standard German and to the Standard German-based regiolect of the Rhine-Ruhr area. Brandenburgish speakers mostly switched to the Standard German-based regiolect of Berlin. Brandenburgish has been almost completely replaced by the Berlin regiolect. Northern Low Saxon speakers switched mostly to pure Standard German.

=== Foreign languages ===
English is the most common foreign language and is almost universally taught at the secondary level; it is also taught at elementary level in some states. Other commonly-taught languages are French, Italian, Spanish and Russian. Dutch is taught in states bordering the Netherlands, and Polish in the eastern states bordering Poland. Latin and Ancient Greek are part of the classical education syllabus offered in many secondary schools.

According to a 2004 survey, two-thirds of Germany's citizens have at least basic knowledge of English. About 20% consider themselves to be competent speakers of French, followed by speakers of Russian (7%), Italian (6.1%), and Spanish (5.6%). The relatively high number of Russian speakers is a result of immigration from the former Soviet Union to Germany for almost 10 consecutive years, plus its having been learned in school by many older former East Germans as compulsory first foreign language.

== See also ==
- Germans
- Census in Germany
- Demographic change in Germany
- Demographics of Berlin
- Demographics of Munich
- Demographics of Cologne
- Demographics of Hamburg
