= Mediaspree =

Media investment project in Berlin, Germany

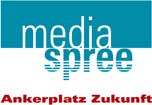
The original Mediaspree logo, with its slogan, "Anchor-Site (of the) Future"

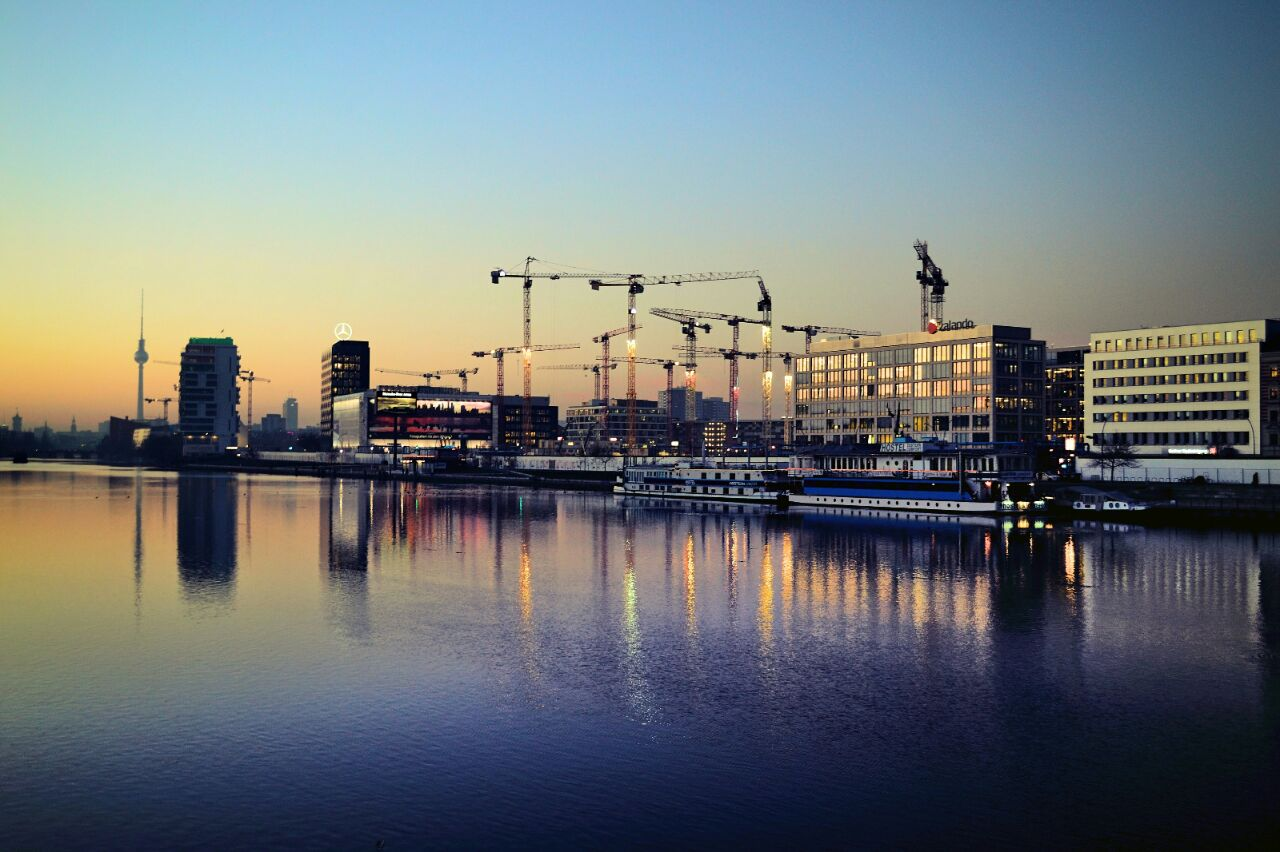
Mediaspree in 2017, cranes showing the future Entertainment District

Mediaspree is one of the largest property investment projects in Berlin. It aims to establish telecommunication and media companies along a section of the banks of the river Spree as well as to implement an urban renewal of the surrounding area. So far, for the most part, unused or temporarily occupied real estate is to be converted into office buildings, lofts, hotels, and other new structures.

The plans date predominantly from the 1990s, but only a part of them was implemented due to unfavorable economic circumstances at the time. Promoters saw in this project a great opportunity for the former East Berlin, while critics saw the selling-out of the area's most valuable properties. The following criteria were defined for sustainable location development:

- Public access to the riverfront,
- Buildings with ground-floor public areas,
- A mixture of large-scale and small-scale use,
- Ambitious architectural concepts,
- The integration of art and media.

== Project management ==
There is no specific institution that centrally manages and markets the project; Mediaspree is merely a label. The planning for individual building projects lies with property owners, investors, and the borough (in particular, Friedrichshain-Kreuzberg).

The association Regionalmanagement mediaspree e.V. (originally, media spree Berlin GmbH) was founded in May 2004 as a contact point for investors and businesses, which lasted until December 2008.

It arose from a private sector initiative as a consortium of different interest groups: investors from the building and construction industry, property owners that, after the Wende (i.e., the fall of the Berlin Wall and the reunification of Germany), had acquired the previously unused land around the path of the Berlin Wall, as well as representatives from the Senate, Borough, and Chamber of Industry and Commerce (IHK: Industrie- und Handelskammer). The borough of Friedrichshain-Kreuzberg was not in charge, but rather a partner in the context of a Public-Private Partnership. Association membership was limited to the owners, renters and leaseholders of land or buildings in the Spree area. Mediaspree e.V. had 21 members in 2008, including the Anschutz Entertainment Group, Behala (a dock and storage company), Berlin's waste management agency, Deutsche Post Property Development, GASAG, IVG Real Estate and TLG Real Estate.

This association considered its mission to be: to act as a broker for the corresponding spaces and properties of the Spree-zone; to advise resident businesses as well as those interested in relocating there; to develop contacts between owners, agencies and sponsors; and to take steps toward marketing and image-building.

After public sponsorship ran out, Mediaspree e.V. was dissolved on 31 December 2008. Its duties are now fulfilled by a property association, recently constituted, which nonetheless still operates under the name Mediaspree.

== Project Site ==
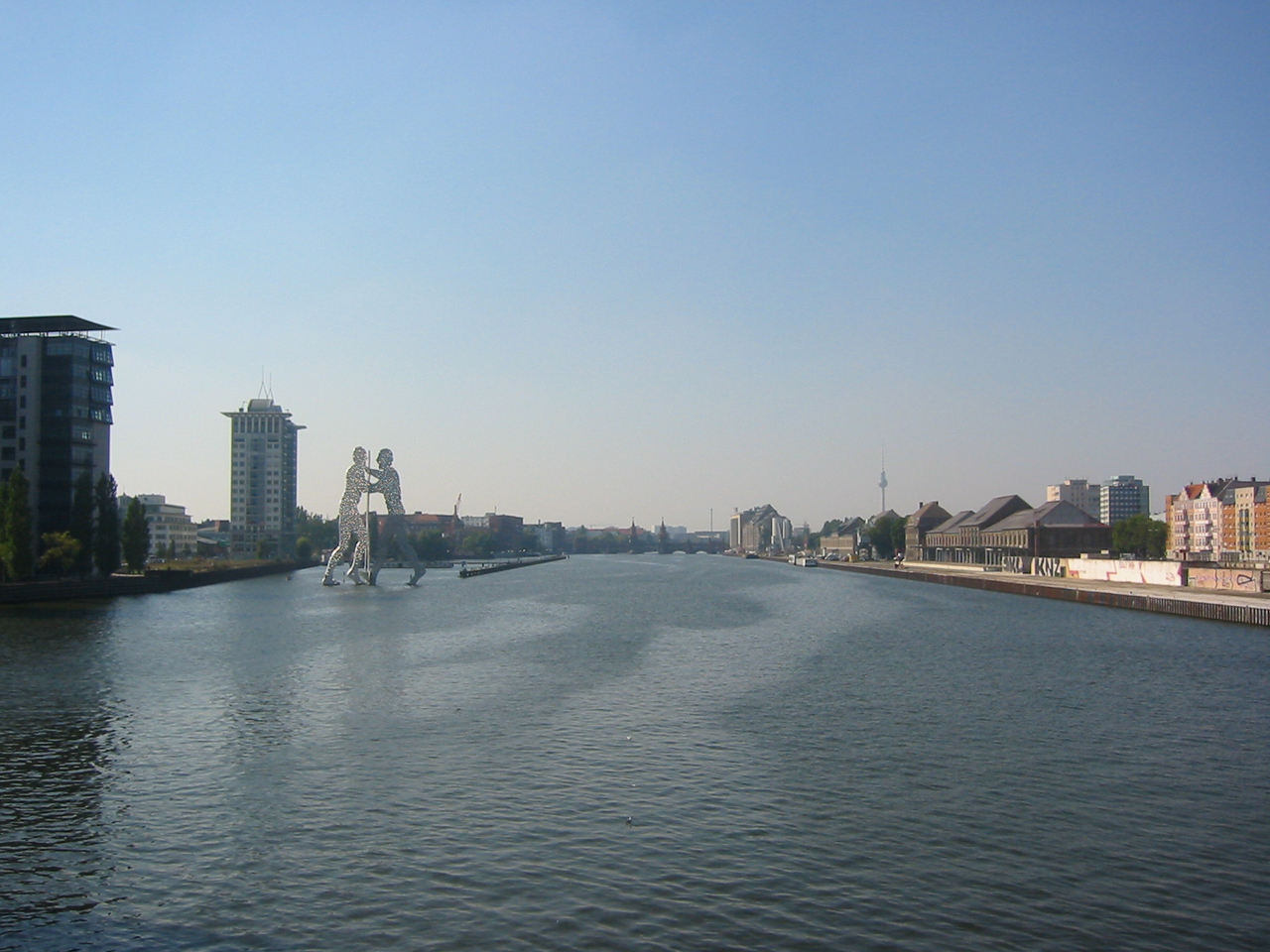
Site of the Mediaspree area

The project extends along a 3.7-kilometre-long (2.3 mi), 180-hectare (440-acre) space on both sides of the Spree riverfront, on the borders of four districts: Mitte, Friedrichshain, Kreuzberg und Alt-Treptow. It is bordered to the west by Jannowitzbrücke, to the north by the railway tracks of the Berlin S-Bahn (rapid transit trains), to the east by Elsenbrücke, and to the south by two streets (Schlesischen Straße and Köpenicker Straße). The Spree is about 150 m (490 ft) wide along this section and the riverfront runs relatively straight. The river is cross-cut by three bridges within the Mediaspree zone: Michaelbrücke, Schillingbrücke and Oberbaumbrücke. Along with large, undeveloped lots one can find numerous industrial and trade buildings from the 19th and 20th centuries, such as the Eierkühlhaus (egg cold-storage warehouse) on the Osthafen (East Harbor) and the Eisfabrik (ice factory), as well as various new buildings and the East Side Gallery. The area is easily accessible by public transit as well as regional and long-distance trains.

== History ==
In the 19th and early 20th centuries, this area was primarily occupied by industry and trade. Many of the buildings still standing date from this period and are characteristic of the architecture of that era. A few of these are now protected by the Denkmalschutz (de) designation; that is, they are listed as historical monuments. Of particular importance for the region before World War II were the East Harbor, Osthafen (de), opened in 1913 with extensive storage facilities for grains and other goods, as well as the Eierkühlhaus (egg cold-storage warehouse) and the Eisfabrik (ice factory).

Between 1939 and 1945, the premises were primarily used by the Wehrmacht (German Armed Forces). The harbor served as a shipping center for goods, and tanks and other munitions were serviced in the former bus garage and present-day event space Arena Berlin (de) in Treptower Park. More than 150 foreign workers and prisoners of war worked on the harbor's premises.

Large portions of the buildings were destroyed after the war. Until 1947, large sites were seized and used by the Soviets, transportable material was stripped and shipped to the Soviet Union as a form of reparation.

During the time of Cold War, this area lay in the middle of the border zone between East- and West-Berlin, which made commercial development impossible. On the GDR side, portions of the industrial buildings were transformed into watchtowers for border security. The Berlin Wall ran along the northern bank of the Spree, parallel to the river that marked the official border. On the West-Berlin side, south of the Spree and bordering on Kreuzberg, stood various alternative projects.

The restructuring of the area after the Wende began slowly. An approximately 1.3 km (0.8 mi) long section of the wall was not torn down, but rather designed and painted by artists since 1990 as the East Side Gallery, the longest open-air gallery in the world. In 1998, the Ostbahnhof train station began renovations, reopening in 2000. Many unused properties were bought up by investors. One decisive development began in 2002 with the passage of a land development plan through the Berlin Senate and the advancement of the "Mediaspree" project.

== Overview ==
Among the first development projects to be completed in the Mediaspree-region after the fall of the Berlin Wall were: the Treptowers (de), the ver.di headquarters at the Schillingbrücke bridge, as well as the renovation of the Eierkühlhaus into the German headquarters for Universal Music, which received 10 Million Euros worth of sponsorship funding from the Senate and was completed in the middle of 2002. In early 2004, there followed the similarly subsidized settlement of MTV Networks Germany in a former warehouse at Osthafen. VIVA and VIVA Plus followed in 2005, due to their acquisition by MTV. The O_{2} World arena was constructed by the Anschutz Entertainment Group on the grounds of the former Ostgüterbahnhof (de) (which was the site of the legendary nightclub Ostgut from 1998 to 2003, predecessor to Berghain) and opened on 10 September 2008, accompanied by protests.

Other building and renovation projects in the Mediaspree-region that have since been completed include the EnergieForum Berlin, the Industriepalast (Industry Palace) at Warschauer Straße, the European Shared Service Center of BASF in Oberbaum-City, the Fernsehwerft (TV-Wharf), the cleaning of the Viktoria-Mühle (Victoria Mill), the Wissinger Höfe (Wissinger Courtyards), the former army bakery and the Josetti-Höfe (Josetti Courtyards). In contrast, as-yet unfinished projects include Spree Urban and Spreeport, the Columbus-Haus, the development of the area around Postbahnhof (the postal train station, de), the Anschutz site, BSR's Quartier in Orange, the prospective fashion house Labels 2, a planned yacht harbor, the Neuen Spreespeicher ("New" Granary on the Spree), and the renovation of the Eisfabrik (de).

For recreational purposes, Mediaspree has planned a 10m (33 ft) wider riverfront strip and a "Park on the Spree," as well as small pocket parks between the Spree and Stralauer Allee around the East Side Gallery. Furthermore, footpaths and bicycle paths are slated to be built on both sides of the river. The reconstruction of the destroyed Brommybrücke bridge, intended to alleviate the forecasted increase in traffic volume, was abandoned after further protests; instead, only a temporary "artistic footbridge" was supposed to be built. It was not built.

== Stadtumbau West ==
Mediaspree is associated with the Senate project Stadtumbau West ("City-Renovation West", de), which calls not only for the restructuring of the Kreuzberg riverfront, but also for the development of the Neukölln-Südring, Schöneberg-Südkreuz and Tiergarten-Nordring/Heidestraße areas. With this project, both the federal government and the state of Berlin hope to counteract the negative consequences of economic and demographic change by fostering "private investment and sustainable workplaces."

== Completed Projects ==
Descriptions are largely based on the descriptions posted on the former mediaspree.de website

=== Northern Spree Riverfront from West to East ===
==== Fortress Multi Service Center ====
Built by Fortress Immobilien AG Meerbusch on Holzmarktstraße 1–9, directly next to the Jannowitzbrücke station, this Multi-Service-Center included a Tamoil gas station, a Burger King with "drive-in", a Lidl discount supermarket and offices. The investment volume came to 8.3 Million Euros. This ensemble was torn down at the end of 2018.

==== Trias ====
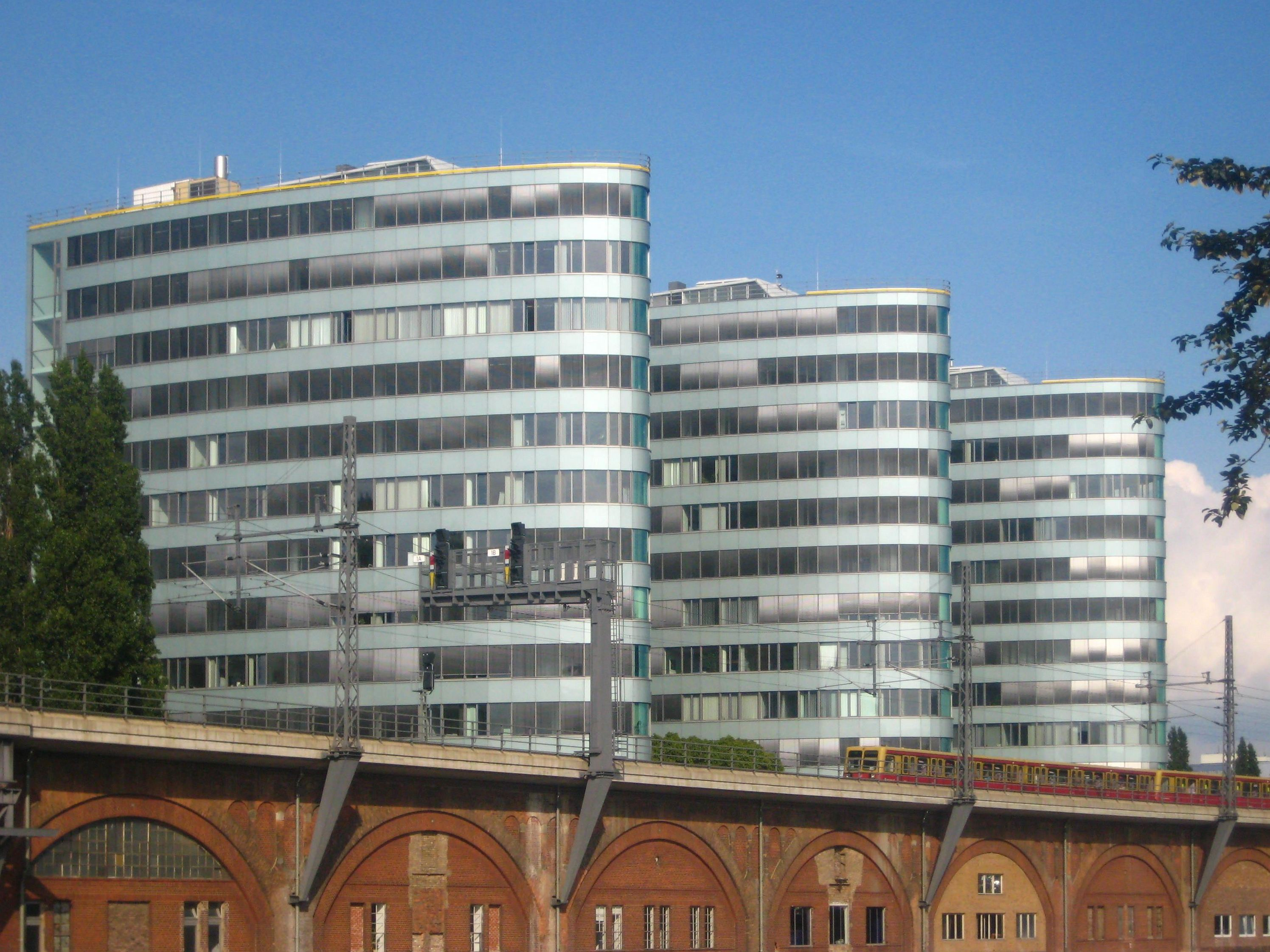
Trias Building, Headquarters of BVG

The Trias on Holzmarktstraße 15–17 was built between 1994 and 1996 and houses the headquarters of the Berliner Verkehrsbetriebe (BVG) since August 2008. The complex is composed of three 13-floor office towers connected by a seven-floor concourse.

==== Ibis Hotel ====
This seven-floor building complex at the Schillingbrücke bridge was completed in the year 2000 and consists of three parts, in which commercial spaces, 20 apartments and the 242-room "Hotel Ibis Berlin City Ost" are located.

==== EnergieForum Berlin ====
The structure at Stralauer Platz 33/34 was erected in 1906–1908 and housed the Zentralmagazin der städtischen Gaswerke (central depot for the municipal gasworks). In 2002, it was converted into the EnergieForum Berlin, with a focus on renewable energy and energy efficiency. The building was also expanded through new construction; the original building, protected as a historical monument, is connected to two modern wings by a glass atrium. The businesses and institutions that reside in the EnergieForum are "green energy" companies that have established themselves in the fields of environmentally friendly and renewable energy as well as energy efficiency.

==== East-Side-Park ====
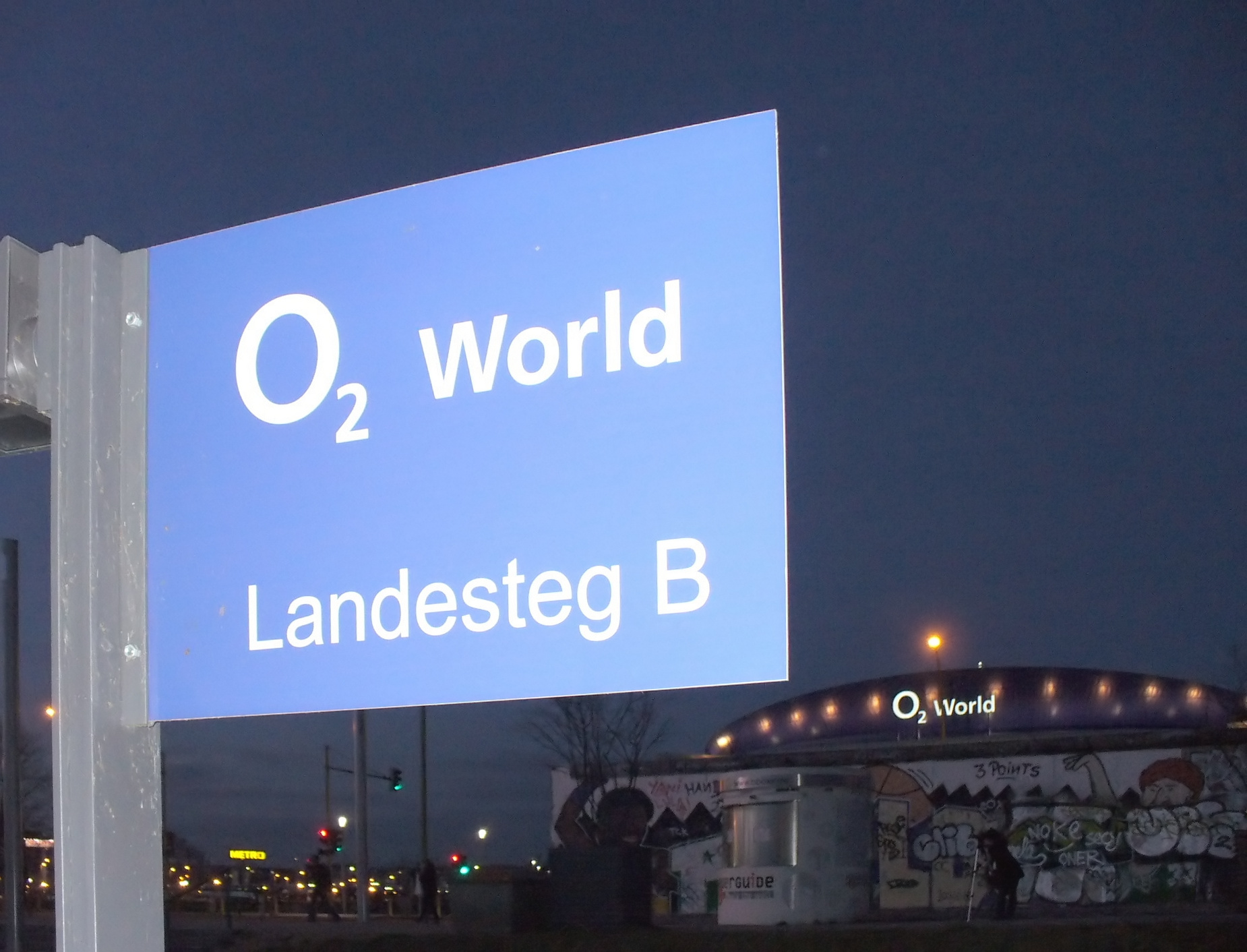
Sign for the boat landing at East-Side-Park, with the Berlin Wall and O_{2} World in the background

The East-Side-Park is situated between the East Side Gallery and the Spree. Like the planned "Park on the Spree" (see below), it was commissioned by the district authority of Friedrichshain-Kreuzberg and designed by the landscape architectural firm Häfner/Jiménez. In the middle of the park is the so-called "Boat Landing Plaza," a boat landing built for the O_{2} World complex. The surface area of the park covers approximately 1.5 hectares (3.7 acres) and was under construction from August 2006 to early 2009. The construction costs ran to 816,000 Euros.

The grounds are split into two levels; the upper level will feature a memorial space for the Berlin Wall and the earlier patrol road. Its sparse design is intended to evoke the "death strip" that used to run along the wall. The East Side Gallery, painted onto the remains of the wall at this site, was repaired and restored in 2008. The lower level of the park provides a promenade directly along the water. A lawn stretches between the two levels, sloping down to the river Spree.

The East-Side-Park has received criticism above all for the boat landing for O₂ World, which will require the removal of a 45 m (148 ft) section of the heritage-protected East Side Gallery. Moreover, a billboard has been built on this site, which was perceived to be objectionable due to its dimensions, light intensity, and location along the sightline between the Oberbaumbrücke and the Fernsehturm.

==== Uber Arena ====
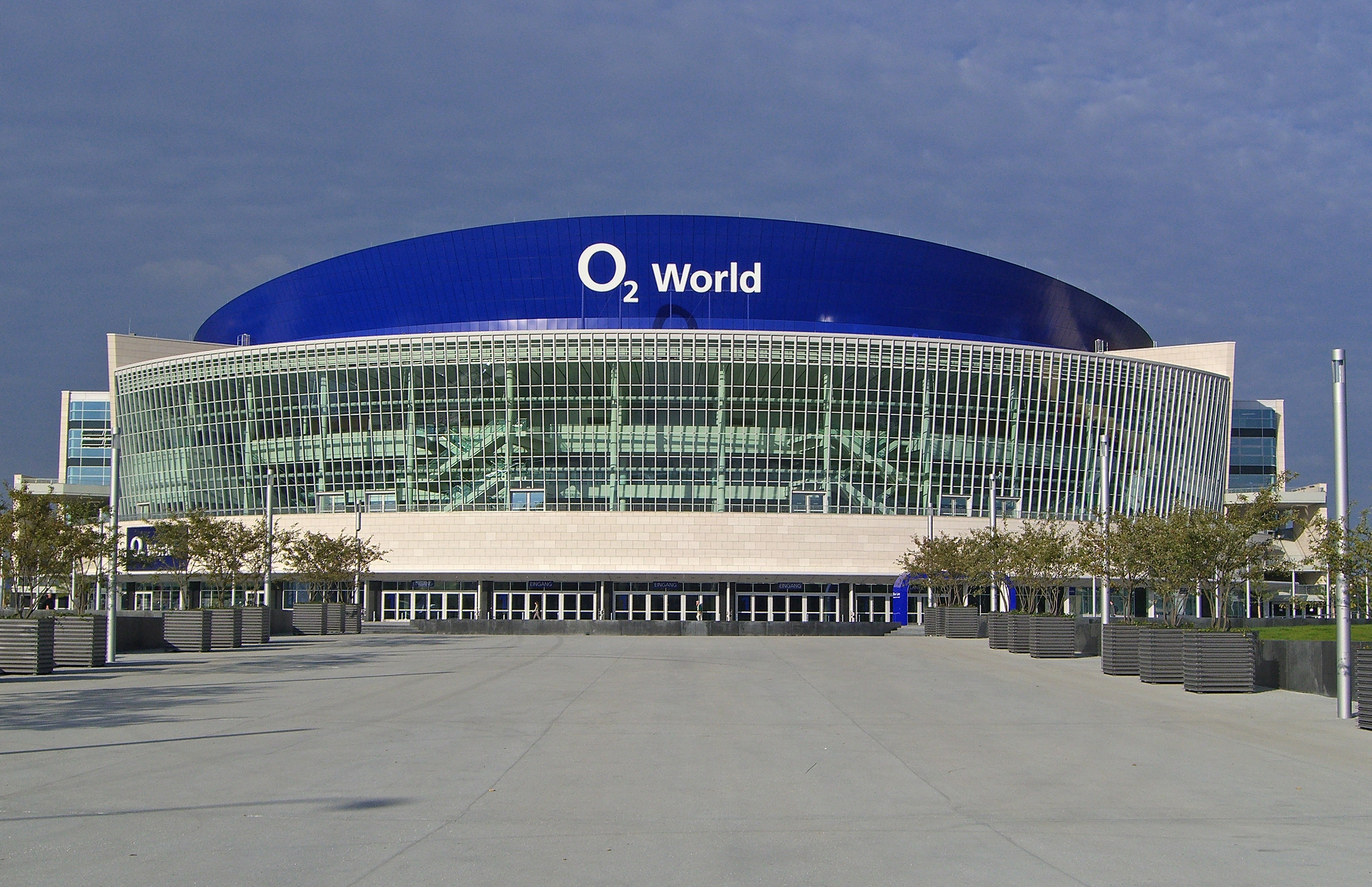
Uber Arena between Berlin Ostbahnhof and Warschauer Straße

With a maximum capacity of 17,000, the Uber Arena at Mühlenstraße 12–30 is the second largest multi-use indoor arena in Germany (after the Lanxess Arena in Cologne). The laying of the first foundation stone took place on 13 September 2006; the grand opening, accompanied by protests, followed on 10 September 2008. The owner and operator is the Anschutz Entertainment Group. The construction costs amount to 165 million Euros and were mostly absorbed by the Berlin Senate. The naming rights agreement with O_{2} (Germany) was set to last for a period 15 years. Since the opening of the arena, it has hosted home games for the city's hockey team, Eisbären Berlin, and their basketball team, Alba Berlin. It is also used for concerts and conventions. The Uber Arena is one of the most criticized projects of the Mediaspree. Complaints have primarily been about the immense size and light intensity of the outdoor LED screens as well as the course of the building's construction, which has been seen as insensitive (see East-Side-Park above). In January 2015, it was announced that the arena will bear the name Mercedes-Benz Arena from July 2015 for a term of 20 years. In 2024, it was announced that the aren'a name would once again be changed to the Uber Arena.

==== BSR-Kundendienstzentrum (BSR Customer Service Center) ====
This customer service center for the BSR (Berliner Stadtreinigungsbetriebe, Berlin's waste management agency) is part of the still-planned Quartier in Orange (see below). BSR moved into a cluster of buildings on Mühlenstraße 9/10 that consists of a new building and an apartment building converted into offices. The buildings, including a BSR service station located on the property, are interconnected by an enclosed walkways on two levels. Situated on the premises are also garages and parking lots for the vehicles of BSR's subsidiary Ruwe GmbH, which has its headquarters on Warschauer Straße.

==== Industriepalast ====
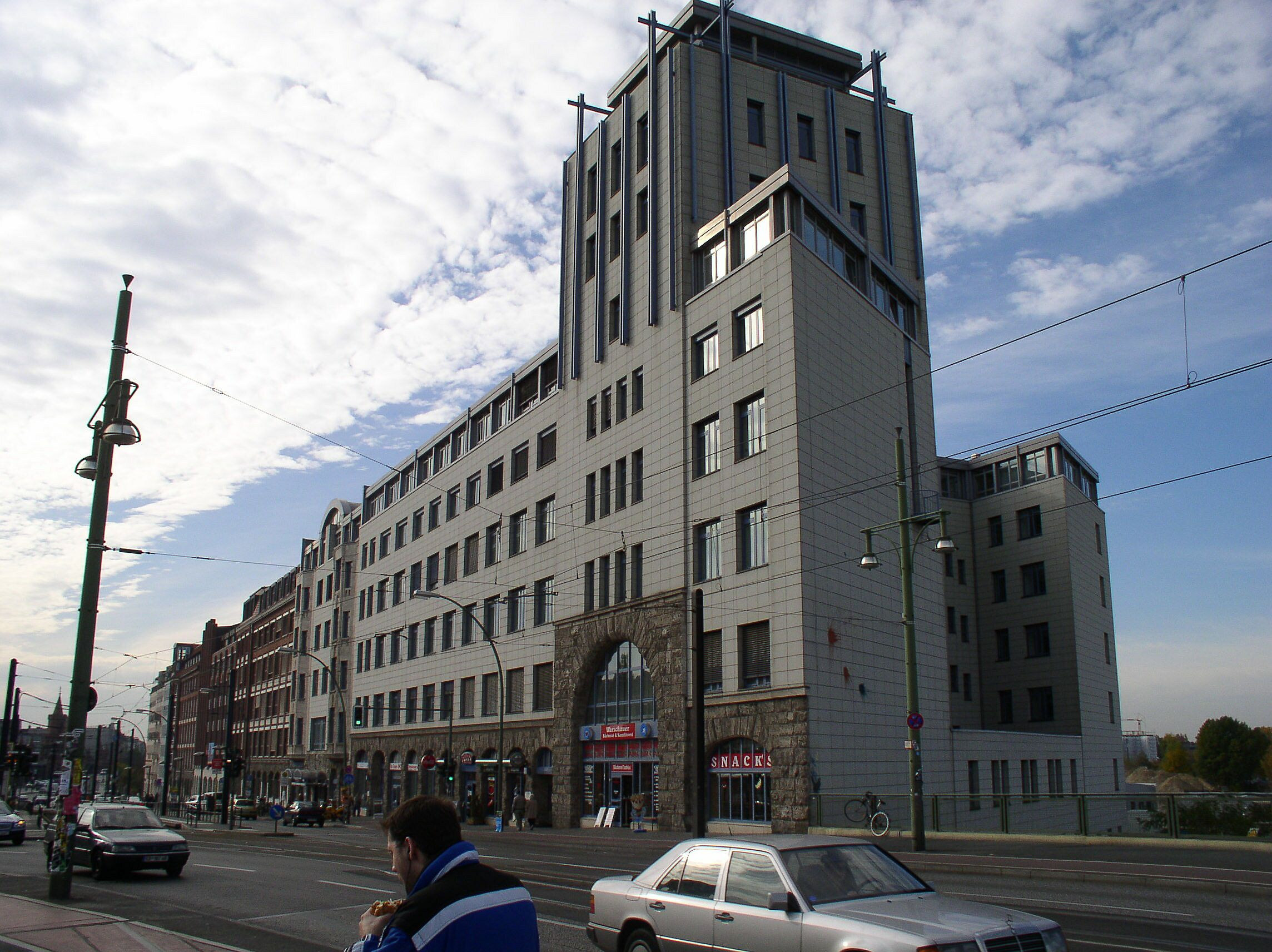
Industriepalast on Warschauer Straße

The so-called "Industriepalast" (Industry Palace) on Warschauer Straße 34–44 was built between 1906 and 1907 according to plans by Johann Emil Schaudt (de). It involves a multi-story factory, typical for its time, made out of five distinct buildings held together by an underlying iron-frame construction.

From 1992 to 1993, the heritage-protected façade of the Industriepalast was remodeled. Buildings 43 and 44 were extensively refurbished for the purposes of the Mediaspree project and a new building was added that matched the style of the historical buildings. The floors were converted into office space, resulting in a total of 3,500m² (37,674sq.ft.) office and trade space.

==== Toyota-Autohaus (Toyota Car Dealership) ====
The Toyota car dealership at Stralauer Allee 44–47 arose from an investment of 10 Million Euros and opened in November 2007. New and used cars are put on display in approximately 2,800m² (30,140sq.ft.) of usable retail space. There is also a car workshop for the luxury line Lexus, which Toyota owns.

==== Universal Music Headquarters, Germany (Eierkühlhaus) ====
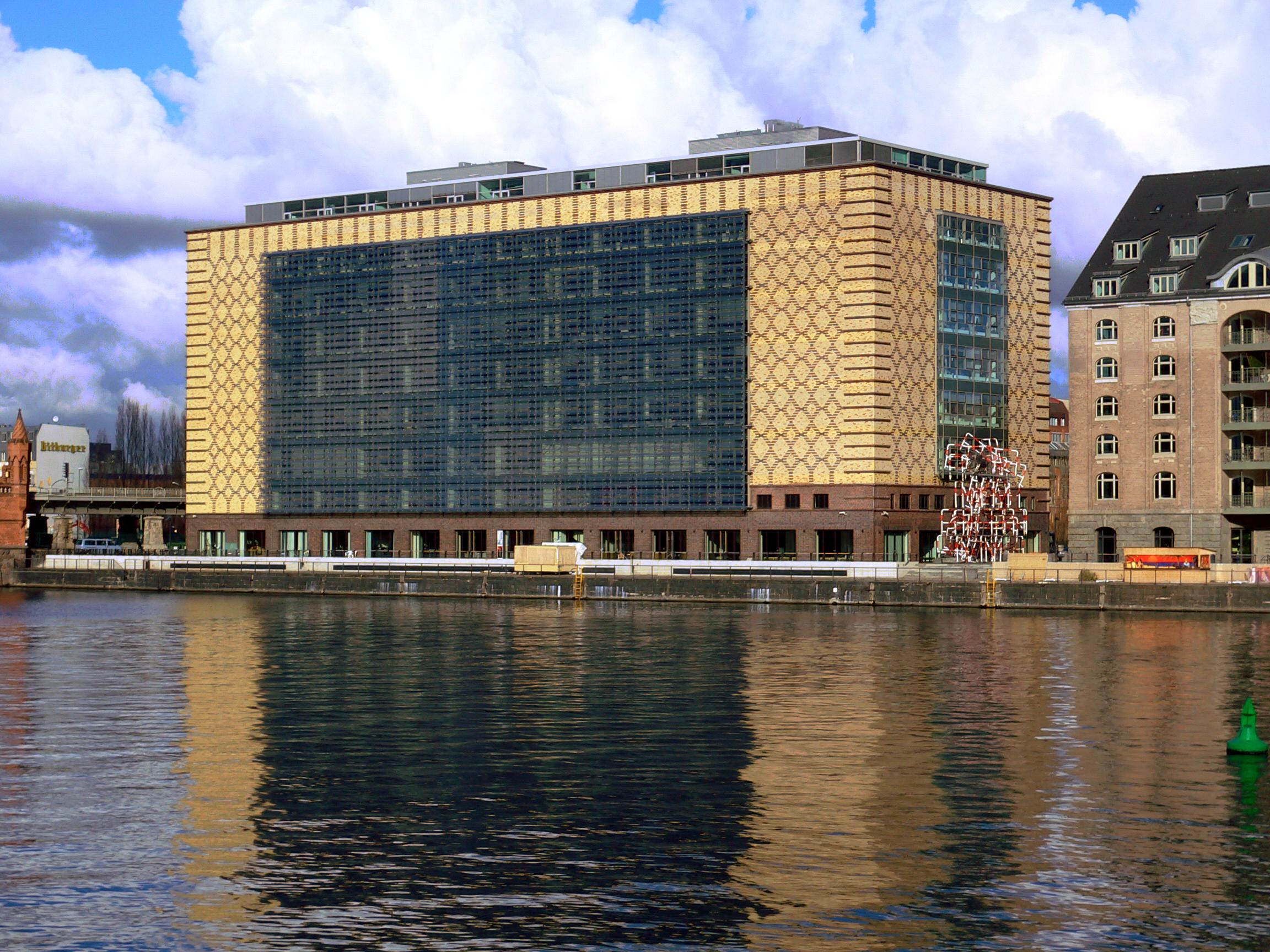
The Eierkühlhaus on the East Harbor in Berlin

Since July 2002, the German headquarters of the Universal Music corporation has been located at Stralauer Allee 1, in a former Eierkühlhaus (egg cold-storage warehouse), which was built in 1928/1929 and designed by the Dresden's building officer, Oskar Pusch. The functional and heritage-protected façade of this former refrigerated warehouse features elements of Bauhaus architecture: 25 cm (9.8 in) thick brickwork walls with diamond-shaped decorative patterns made of clinker bricks and molded ceilings. After being closed down, the Berlin Harbor and Warehouse Corporation (Berliner Hafen- und Lagerhausgesellschaft, or BEHALA) decided in 1992 to put the Eierkühlhaus and the neighboring granary (see below) to new use. There were plans, in 1995, to connect the two buildings into one complex and to use it as a "Business Design Center," which was nevertheless not brought to fruition.

From 2000 to 2002, the cold-storage warehouse was converted into an office and commercial building by the Berlin architect Reinhard Müller. It was in doing so that the originally closed façade of the building was opened on three sides and furnished with a glass curtain wall. Only the northwest side facing the Oberbaumbrücke still features a closed brick wall. The historical style elements of the windows, barrel-vault ceilings and walls have survived. Originally, in the interest of historical preservation, there were plans to cover the window panes in screened diamond shapes to continue the pattern from the brickwork and to achieve the impression of a continuous façade. Due to problems with the lighting of interior spaces, this was ultimately abandoned. Aside from Universal Music, various other media and service industry businesses have moved into the building.

==== Office Lofts in the Granary ====
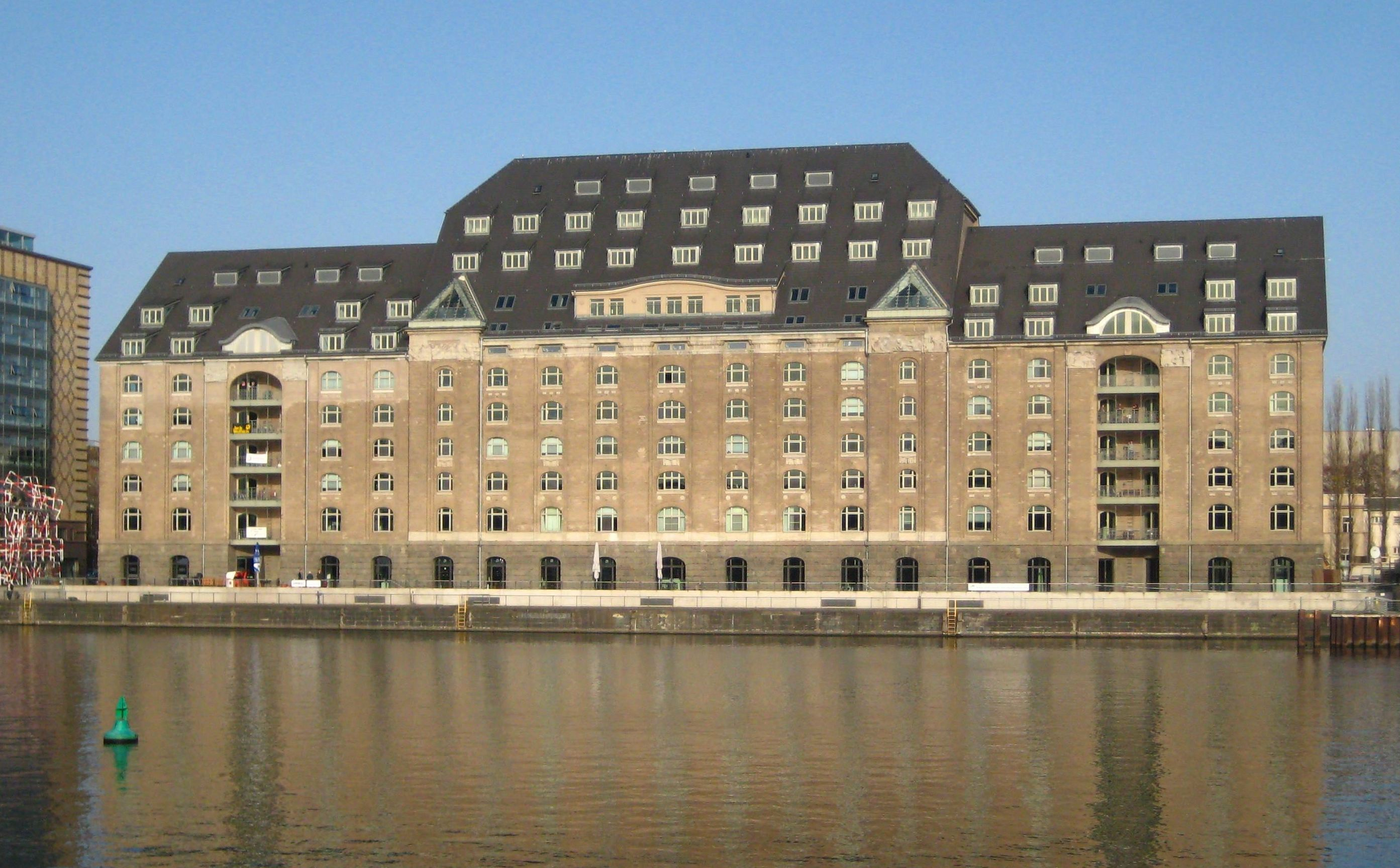
The former granary

Built between 1907 and 1913, this granary was designed by Berlin architect Friedrich Krause, who had already completed the docks in Stettin. He opted for a classicist design typical for the time, including a giant hipped roof, clinker brickwork, and ashlar masonry.

Until 1990 the building was used as a warehouse, after which it stood empty for several years. After a construction permit was issued in May 2000, it was completely refurbished until March 2001, leaving the stylistic elements of the windows, hipped roof and walls intact. Additional stairwells and elevators as well as an underground garage were newly constructed. Over all eight floors, approximately 18,000m² (193,750sq.ft.) of offices were created, which apparently drew great interest from renters—at present, there are no spaces available for rent.

==== Oberbaum City ====
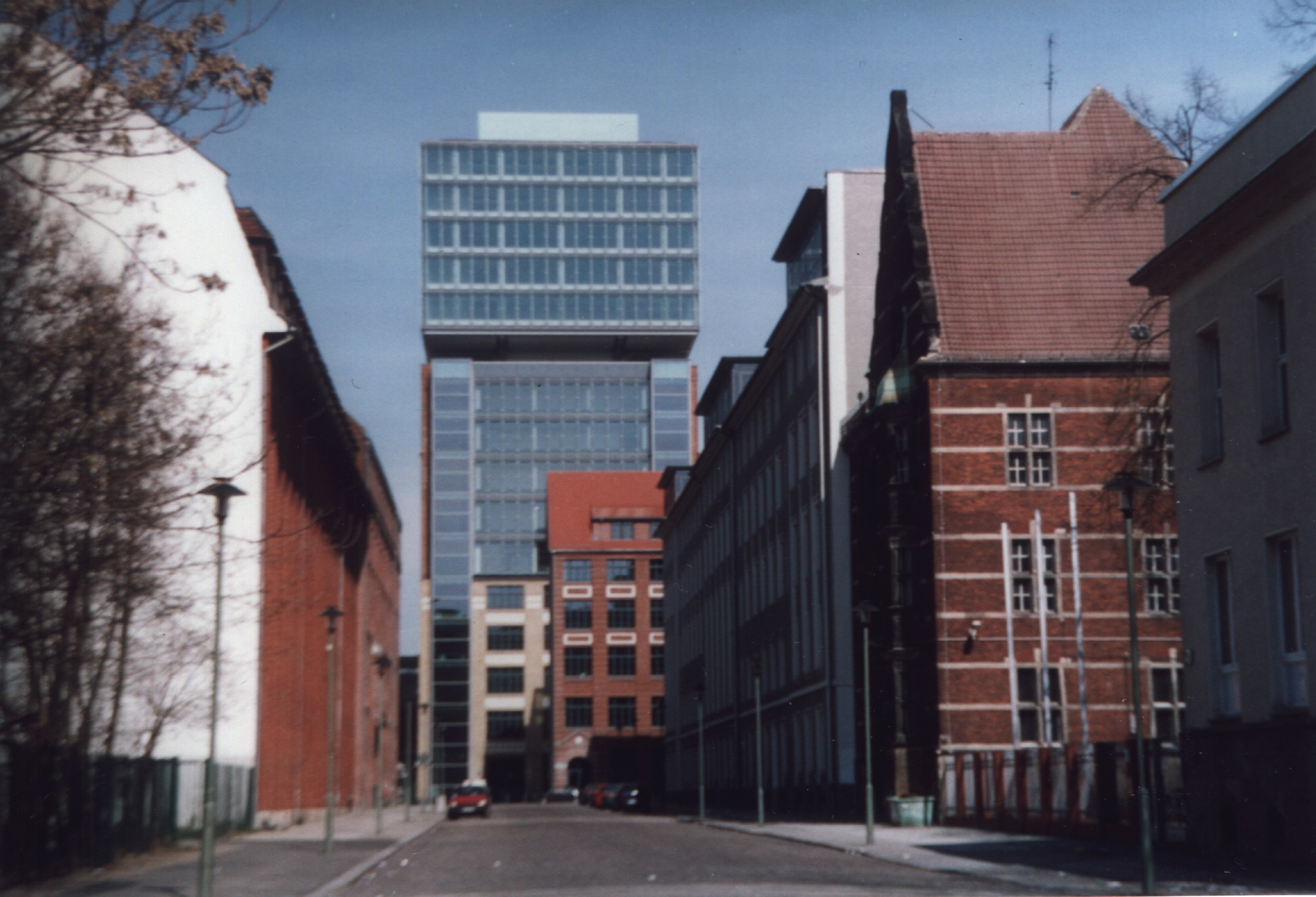
Oberbaum-City buildings and the former "Narva (Company)-Cube", now used by BASF

Oberbaum-City is the name given to the former Narva light bulb factory since 1999. It is bordered on the west by Warschauer Straße, on the north by Bahnstrasse as well as the S-Bahn station Warschauer Straße, on the east by Lehmbruckstraße and to the south by the river Spree. The name of the complex comes from the neighboring Oberbaumbrücke.

After Narva and Osram had completely halted production in 1992, the existing buildings were completely gutted, along with their heritage-protected façades, and were expanded and renovated under the direction of the architects Reichel und Stauth (from Braunschweig). In doing so, the original structures and their historical façades could be preserved with modern steel construction. Food and retail space was developed in five building complexes as well as over 80,000m² of office space. Approximately 70 firms have offices here, including BASF (see below), adesso AG, DEKRA, ThyssenKrupp AG and the customer service center for the Deutsche Post. Oberbaum City is managed and marketed by HVB Real Estate, a subsidiary of UniCredit Bank AG (HypoVereinsbank). Further development projects may be on the horizon for the remaining buildings.

==== BASF European Shared Service Center ====
The most striking building of Oberbaum City is the "Narva-Würfel" ("Narva-Cube," named after the former lightbulb company), also known as the Lichtturm (light tower). It has been leased by BASF since 2005 as a location for its European service center. The building was constructed between 1906 and 1912 by the Deutsche Gasglühlicht AG (German Gaslight Co., de) as part of a gaslight plant and was Berlin's first high-rise building. The addition of glass construction to heighten the building occurred in 1963. From mid-1997 to mid-2000, the plant was converted into an office building and is now listed as a historical monument of engineering.

==== MTV Central Europe ====
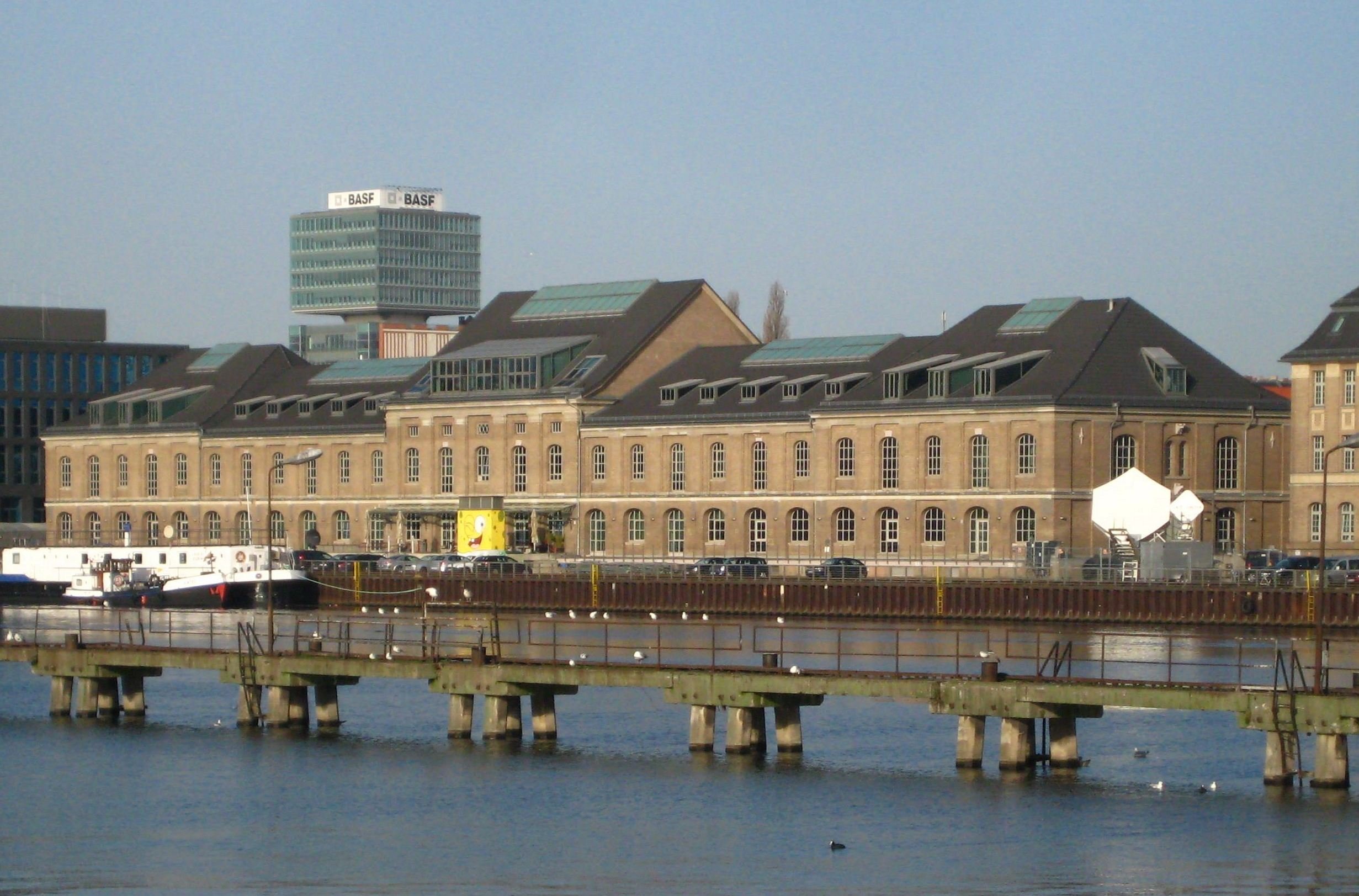
MTV's broadcast center in the former East Warehouse

In early 2004, the headquarters of the German broadcaster MTV Germany moved from Munich to Stralauer Alle 6/7, into a former BEHALA warehouse, which was thoroughly refurbished. To the west, between 2006 and 2007, a new building was erected for the affiliate broadcast group Viacom (VIVA, VIVA Plus, Nickelodeon and Comedy Central). The building has a square layout with an edge-length of approximately 40 m (130 ft) and a height of approximately 19 m (62 ft). The building houses offices for 300 employees, archival and technical areas, common areas and an in-house daycare center. The clay brick façade of the new building was intended to match the neighboring warehouse in both brick-shape and color.

==== A-Medialynx GmbH ====
The former harbor offices of BEHALA at Stralauer Allee 8 were renovated in 2007 and subsequently occupied by A-Medialynx GmbH, a full-range supplier for TV productions and satellite communications technology owned by Helmut Audrit.

==== Fernsehwerft (TV Dockyard) ====
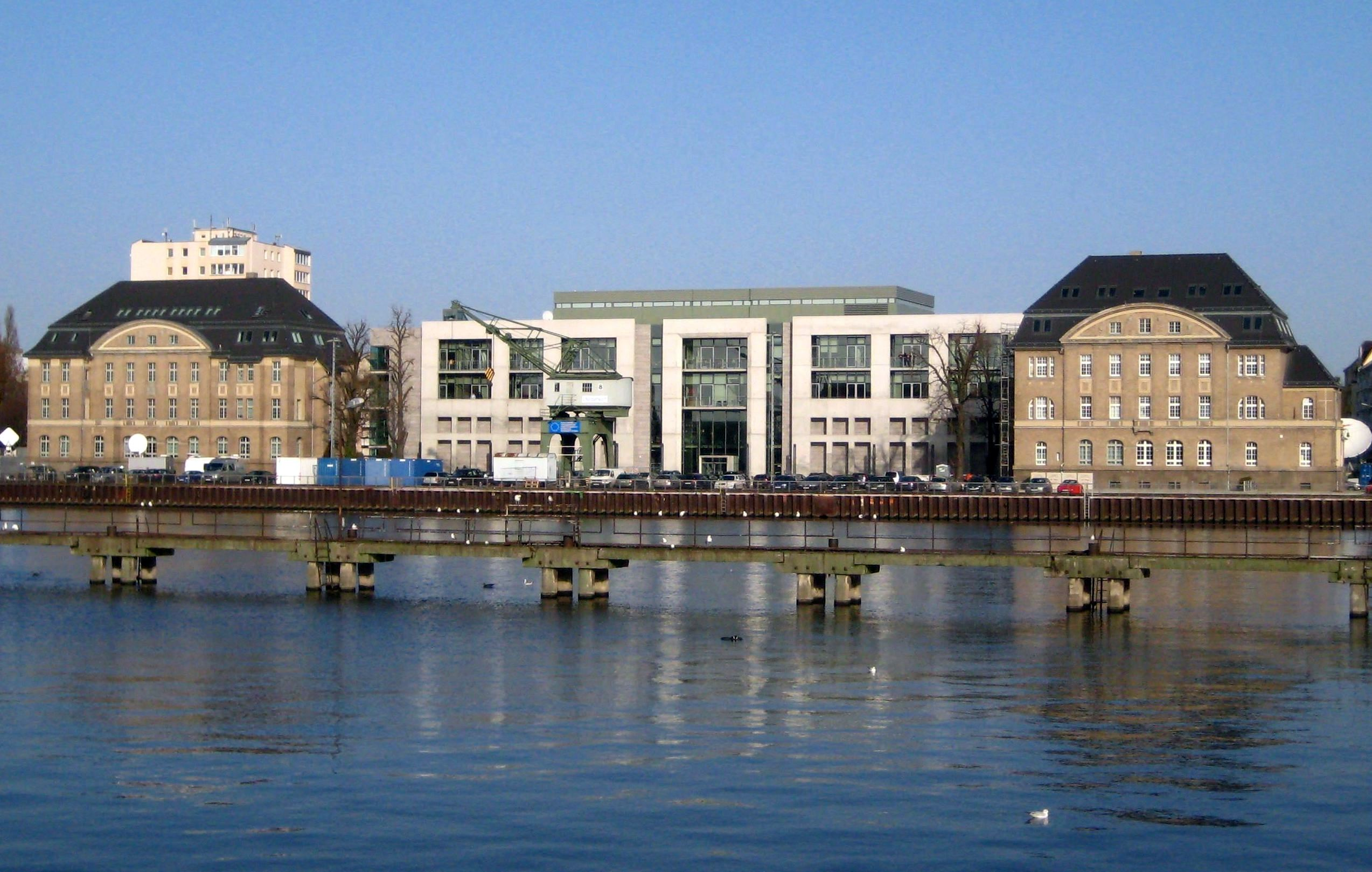
The new building for Fernsehwerft between the buildings of A-Medialynx GmbH (left) und von Zigarren Herzog (right).

A new building was constructed between July 2007 and February 2009 between BEHALA's former harbor offices and cafeteria. The Fernsehwerft (TV Dockyard) houses two modern TV studios, cutting rooms and offices across a surface area of approximately 6,000m² (64,583sq.ft.). The building is used by sister companies A-Medialynx GmbH (already based nearby in Stralauer Allee 8) and fernsehwerft GmbH.

Since July 2009, the TV programs Sat.1-Frühstücksfernsehen (de) and Sat.1 Magazin have been produced here by maz&more Gmbh, a full subsidiary of N24 (Germany), which Sat.1-Zentralredaktion on 1 January 2009. The executive officers are Torsten Rossmann (chairman) and Maria von Borcke.

==== Zigarren Herzog ====
The former BEHALA harbor cafeteria at Stralauer Allee 9 was built in 1909 and is protected as a historical moment. Like the harbor's offices, it was refurbished in 2007 and occupied by A-Medialynx GmbH, who owns the building. Since 2008, a 200m² (2,152sq.ft.) space has been rented out to Zigarren Herzog Vertriebsgesellschaft mbH (Herzog Cigar Co.), a company that maintains a Salan and a 60m² (645sq.ft.) humidor for cigar storage.

==== Labels Berlin 1 ====
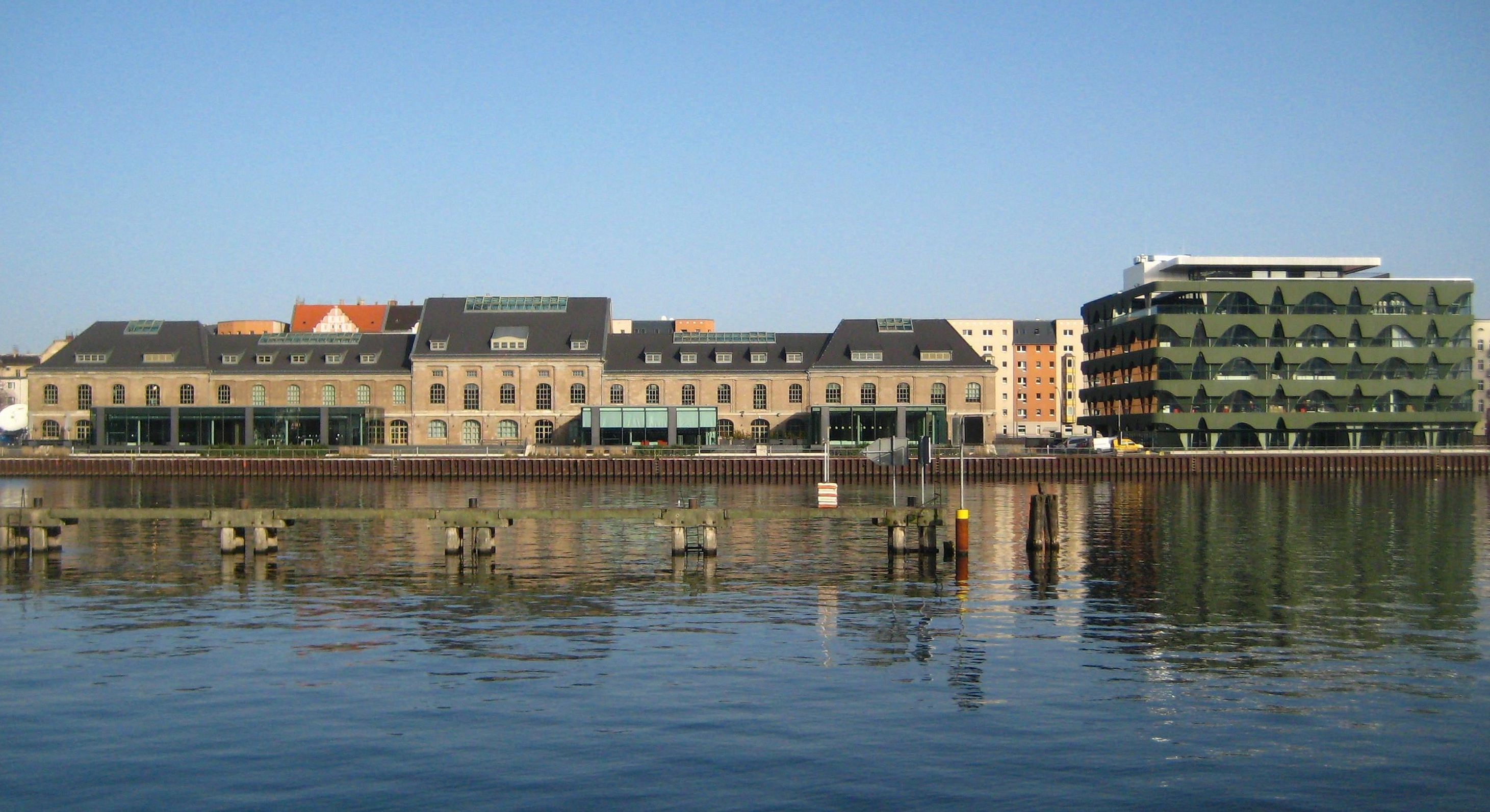
Labels Berlin 1 in the old East Warehouse (left) and the new building for Labels Berlin 2

The former BEHALA East Warehouse on Stralauer Allee 10/11 was built in 1913 by Friedrich Krause and is listed as a historical monument of turn-of-the-century industrial architecture for its clinker brick façade, pilasters and moldings of limestone. In 2006, it was thoroughly cleaned, refurbished and renovated by Labels Projektmanagement GmbH & Co. KG in close cooperation with its future occupants. After the completion, eight fashion companies set up showrooms in that location, including Hugo Boss, Esprit and Tom Tailor. Additional new construction has been underway in the neighboring lot for an expansion, Labels Berlin 2 (see below).

==== Labels Berlin 2 ====
East of Labels Berlin 1, and in violation of a successful citizen's initiative in July 2008, the new building Labels Berlin 2 has been constructed. The design is by the Basel Architectural Firm HHF.

The edifice has a green concrete façade, with a striking cut-out pattern of two alternating sinus curves of differing widths in the exposed concrete. With a total of 7,000m² in surface area, the five floors offer showroom space for twelve fashion companies. On the ground floor, there is a venue space for fashion shows, parties, and catering. On the roof is a leafy lounge. Additionally, there will be a pier built on the Spree, with a floating island for outdoor events and fashion shows.

=== Southern Spree Riverfront from East to West ===
==== Treptowers ====
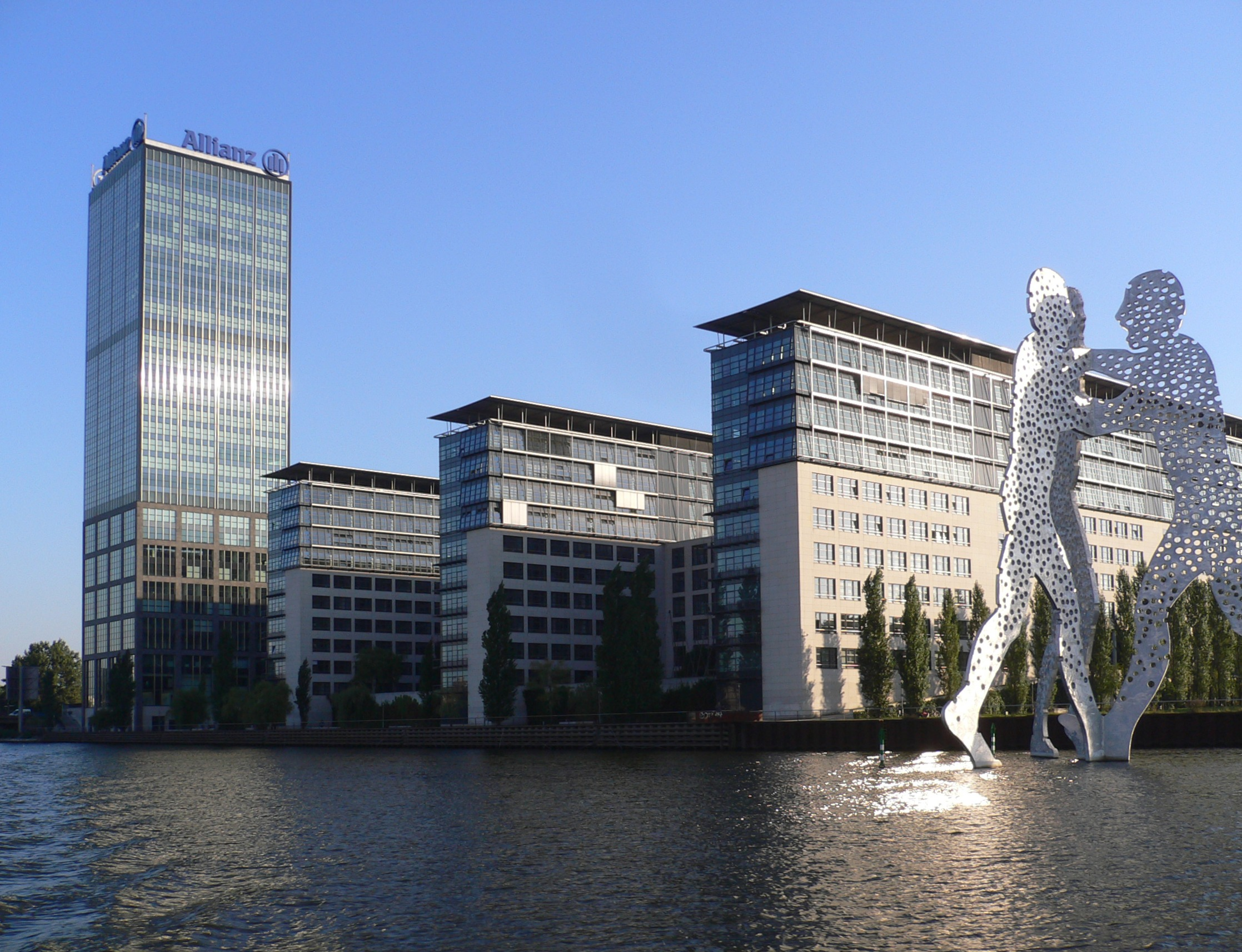
Treptowers viewed from the Spree

The Treptowers are a four-part building complex right at the Elsenbrücke bridge. The highest part is the tower, visible from a distance, which at 125 m (410 ft) is the tallest office building in Berlin. The already-existing buildings that were part of VEB Electronics Factory—in operation until 1995—were integrated into the new construction. The developer and owner is Roland Ernst Städtebau GmbH. After completion of the complex in 1998 it was taken over by Allianz SE; the building is now primarily a Berlin branch office for the company, although other parts are rented out.

==== TwinTowers ====
The building complex between Hoffmannstraße and the river Spree consists of four parts: two 15-floor towers and two five-floor quadrangles. It was designed by the Stuttgart-based architectural firm Kieferle & Partner and completed in 1997. The over 24,000m² (258,334sq.ft.) of office and commercial space is rented out to various businesses, of which 6,700m² (72,118sq.ft.) goes to 50Hertz Transmission GmbH.

==== Arena ====
Arena Berlin on Eichenstraße 4 is an event venue in Berlin-Treptow. It is located in a former bus garage for the Berliner Verkehrsbetriebe (BVG, Berlin Transport Company). When it was built in 1927 by the architect Franz Ahrens, it was the largest unsupported hall in Europe, at 7,000m² (75,347sq.ft.). During World War II, it was used by the National Socialists (i.e., "Nazis") as a maintenance hangar for tanks and other war machines, then from the end of the 1940s until the beginning of the 1950s it was used as a refugee camp. From 1961, due to its location inside the border strip of the Berlin Wall, it was only accessible to GDR troops and BVG employees with a special permit. In 1993, it was shut down as the center of operations for the BVG, due to structural deterioration. After being refurbished as a historical monument, the association ART Kombinat was founded in 1995 to use the hall for cultural functions. Today, Arena hosts concerts, lectures, conferences, galas, TV shows and other events.

The theater and event venue Glashaus (Glass House) also belongs to the Arena Berlin complex, as well as the MAGAZIN exhibit hall, Badeschiff ("Bathing Boat"), the club/restaurant boat Hoppetosse and the bar Club der Visionaere.

==== Wasserschloss (Castle on the Water) ====
This former commercial park on Schlesischen Straße 26 is distinguishable by its traditional clinker brick façade and transom windows. After refurbishment, the interior was converted into business lofts, which are rented out Armo Verwaltungsgesellschaft mbH. The colloquial name Wasserschloss comes from its position at the mouth of the Landwehrkanal into the river Spree.

==== ORCO-GSG Business Park ====
The building complex on Schlesische Straße 27 was built between 1926 and 197 by the Berlin Mortar Works and is partially protected as a historical monument. In 1997, the complex was expanded with new constructions. The project leader was the Berlin-based Gewerbesiedlungsgesellschaft mbH (GSG, Business Site LLC), which was taken over by the real estate company ORCO Property Group in 2007. All sections of the building are six storeys high. The 32 total rental units are used by various companies as business, office, production, and trade spaces.

==== Industriepalast at Schlesisches Tor ====
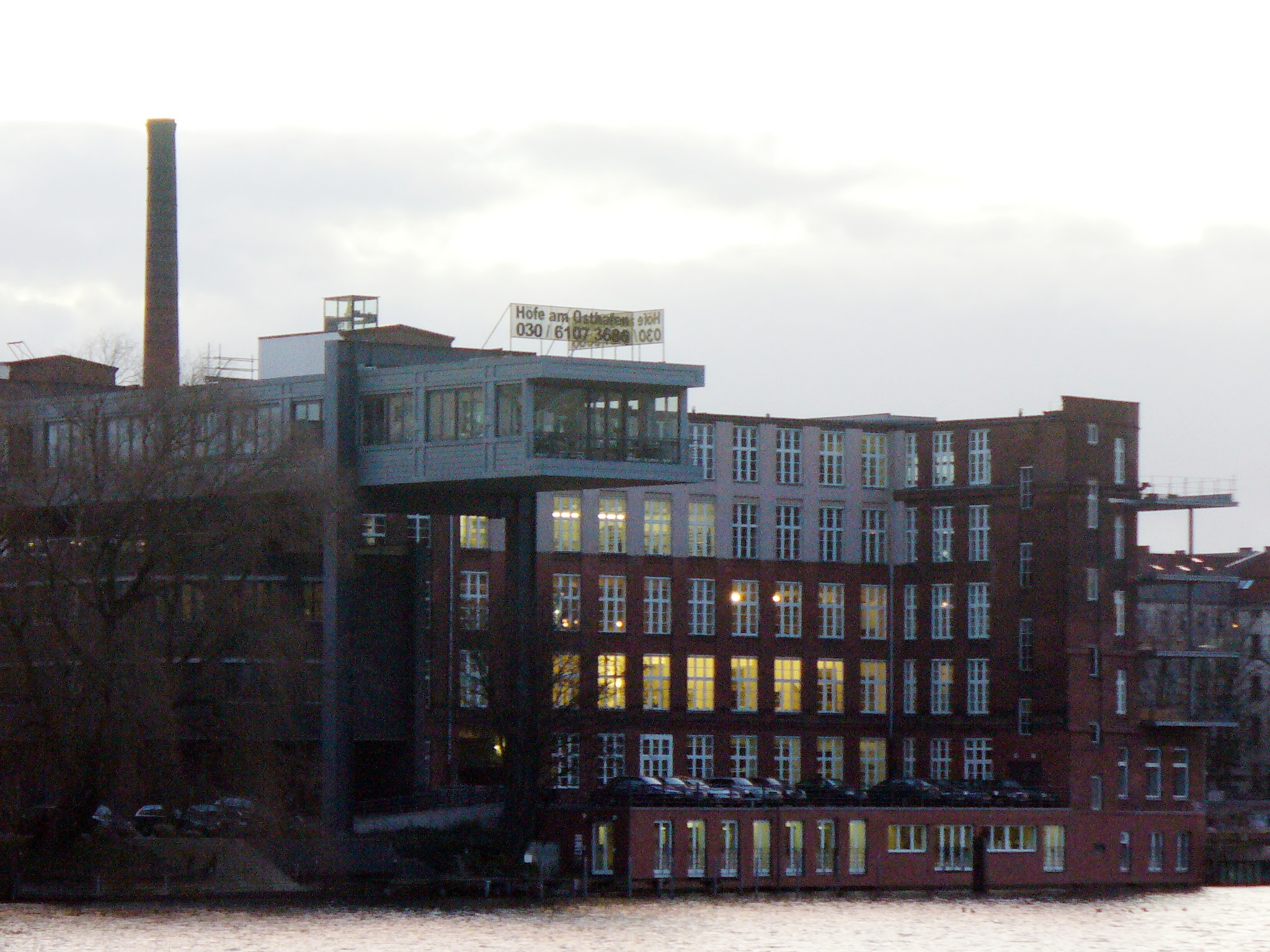
The Industriepalast seen from the north bank of the Spree

This business park on Schlesische Straße 29/30 was built between 1907 and 1908 and is listed as a historical monument. It is colloquially known as the "Industriepalast at Schlesiches Tor." The spaces are rented out by the Verwaltung Berliner Grundstücke GmbH (Berlin Real Estate Management LLC), which also has its head offices in the building. An especially remarkable element of the complex is the steel and glass superstructure that hangs out over the river Spree from the fourth floor of one of the buildings.

==== Viktoria-Mühle (Victoria Mill) ====
Victoria Mill (Schlesische Straße 38) was constructed between 1891 and 1898 and is protected as a historical monument. The original complex includes three cross-buildings; in contrast, the granary on Cuvrystraße and the factory building on Falckensteinstraße were added after World War II. The whole complex is organized into individual parts: the grain silo with cleaning and silo facilities, the mill building, the flour storehouse with a flour silo, and an apartment and business wing. Until the end of the 1960s, grain was processed and stores on the premises. The nightclub Club 103 was located here until September 2008. The remodeling of the area was planned by the architectural firm aschenbrenner mosler & andere. Studios, apartments and office-lofts were created in the refurbished buildings, which are managed by Artus Lagerhaus GmbH (also located in the building).

==== Wissinger Höfe (Wissinger Courtyards) ====
The Wissinger Yards were once the largest seed and grain storehouse in Europe. The wholesaler Julius Wissinger had the site built in 1908 as Lagerhaus Süd-Ost (South-West Warehouse). One can find the complex, which is listed as a historical monument, at Pfuelstraße 5, directly on the river Spree. From the end of the 1990s to the beginning of the 2000s, the buildings were thoroughly refurbished and repaired. They are primarily offices and business lofts as well as music spaces and artists' workshops, in which record labels and modern service enterprises have taken up residence. The building complex is owned and operated by the Berlin-based Kuthe GmbH.

==== Nähmaschinenfabrik (Sewing-Machine Factory) ====
The former Singer sewing-machine factory on Köpenicker Straße 8/9 was refurbished in the 1990s. This heritage-protected building complex includes a factory building dating from 1860 as well as a brick building from 1927 that was used by Singer as a storehouse and branch office. Most of the renovated space has been converted to offices; at the beginning of 2009, 200 employees of media and telecommunications companies moved into approximately 3,000m² of space. There are plans to expand the building in which a private bicycle museum is located.

==== Marmeladenfabrik (Marmalade Factory) ====
This residential and factory building on Köpenicker Straße 10a was constructed directly on the river Spree in 1889, in the Jugendstil (i.e., Art Nouveau) style. The apartments in the front building were originally stately officer's apartments. The former Marmalade Factory is situated in two cross-buildings behind the front building. The premises are protected under Ensembleschutz (de), which is a form of heritage protection for a collection of structures based on how they fit together (rather than their individual architectural styles, for example). The whole factory site was comprehensively renovated, modernized and expanded between from 2004 to 2005. The factory halls were converted into lofts and penthouses and their balconies were widened. The rental units are managed and rented out by Erber Immobilien.

==== Heeresbäckerei (Army Bakery) and Viktoria-Speicher II (Victoria Granary II) ====
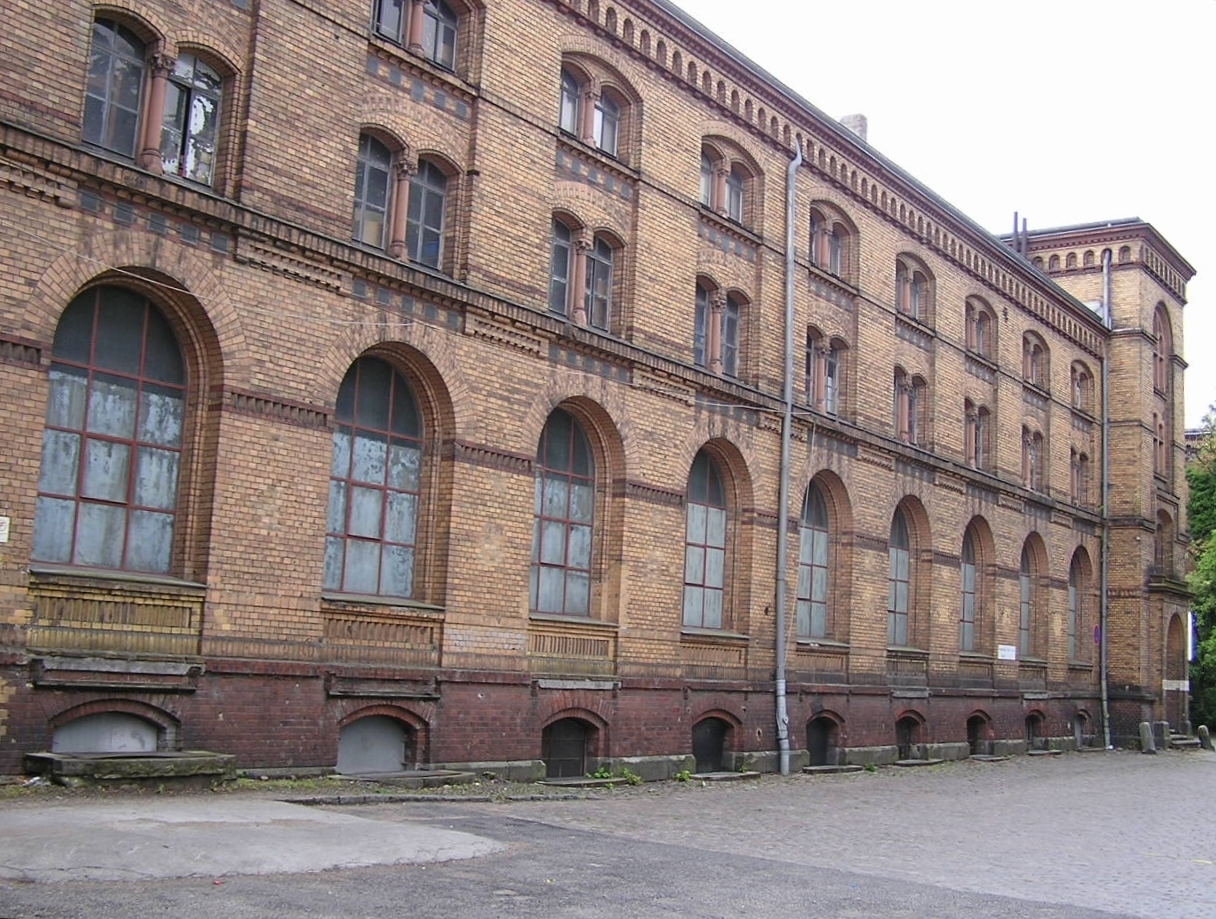
Die Heeresbäckerei Berlin

The Army Bakery was built in 1805 at Köpenicker Straße 16/17 and was part of the Königlichen Preußischen Proviantamt (Royal Prussian Commissariat). From 1888 to 1893 the facility was expanded with five additional buildings, which—excepting one mill—still stand today and are listed as historical sites. The representative façade of the Army Bakery is six storeys high and consists of fairfaced, yellow brickwork. Inside, there are cast-iron supports and prussian barrel-vaults. The renovated floorspace amounts to 9,300m² (100,104sq.ft.).

Throughout the complex, office and business lofts are planned within the scope of the Mediaspree. The rooms will be rented out as storage spaces by Polaris Immbobilienmanagement GmbH. This site also features the Lounge-Club and Restaurant Spindler & Klatt.

==== Velvet-Fabrik (Velvet Factory) ====
The lot at Köpenicker Straße 18–20 is approximately 10,000m² (107,640sq.ft) large and features two historical structures, built between 1852 and 1881. This was the former site of the Berlin Velvet Factory. Distinguishing features include high ceilings, cast-iron supports and exposed brickwork. The buildings were refurbished between 2008 and 2009 according to historical preservation standards by Nicolas Berggruen Holdings GmbH and they are now rented out as offices, apartments, and artists' lofts. At the end of October 2008, the designer furniture retailer Exil Wohnmagazin opened their new head offices at Köpenicker Straße 20 on 6,000m² (64,580sq.ft.) of floorspace.

==== ver.di-Bundeszentrale ====
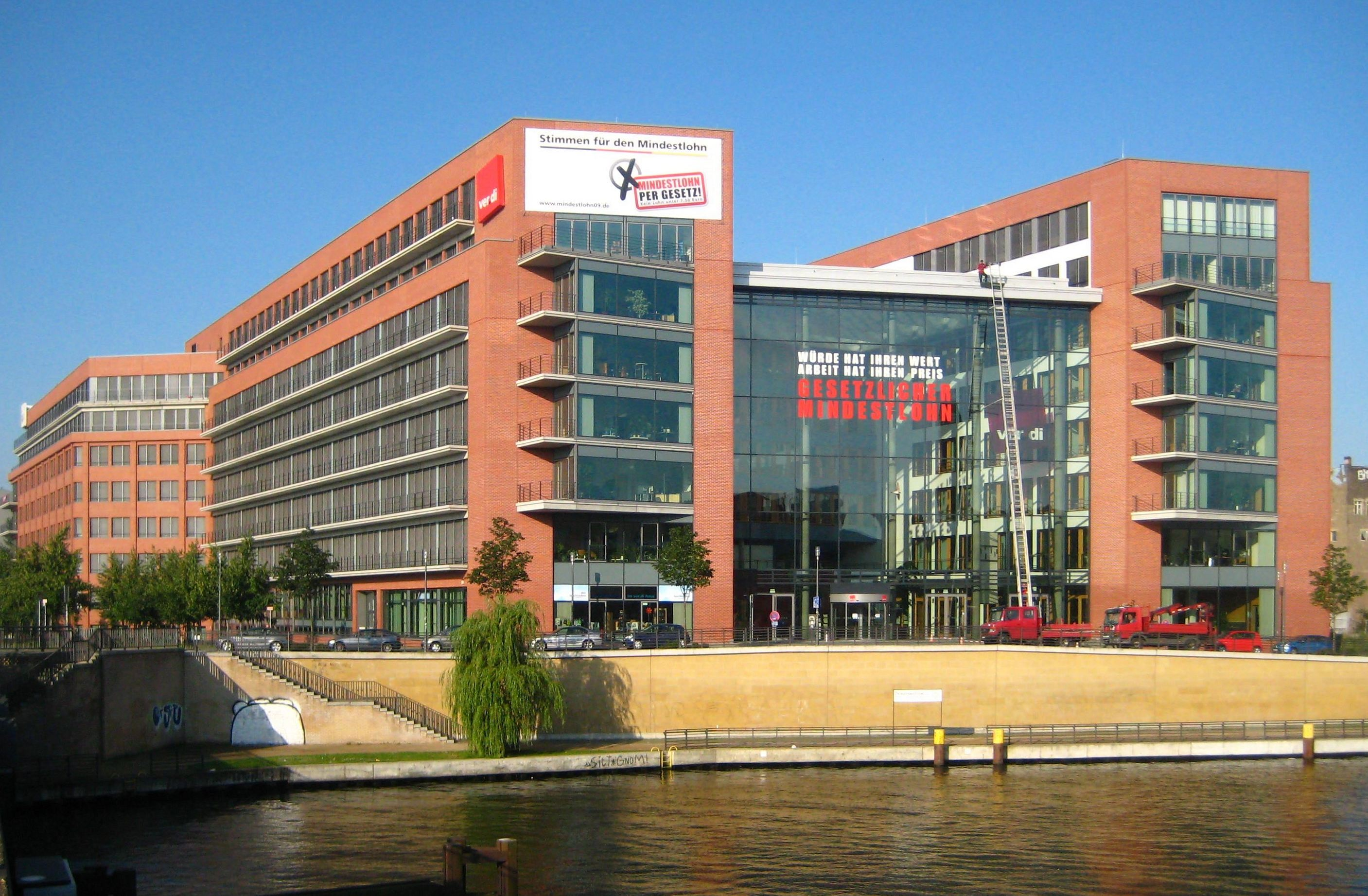
Ver.di regional offices on Paula-Thiede-Ufer in Berlin

A new office building was constructed at Paula-Thiede-Ufer 10 between November 2002 and July 2004. The building was designed by the architectural firm Kny & Weber and is the first completed part of the larger Spreeport project (see below). It is 154 m (505 ft) long, 65 m (213 ft) wide and 35 m (115 ft) high. The façade is composed of glass, steel, and red bricks. The main entrance on the river Spree presents a 23-metre-high (75 ft) atrium. The building is equipped with a large conference center with modern media technology, catering areas, publicly accessible bookstore by Buchergilde Gutenberg as well as its own landing dock on the river Spree. The principal tenant since August 2004 is Vereinte Dienstungswerkschaft (ver.di), which uses the building as a national office and administration center.

==== BDA-Bundesgeschäftsstelle (BDA National Branch Office) ====
The Bund Deutscher Architekten (BDA, Association of German Architects) established their national headquarters in this office building on Köpenicker Straße 48–49. The offices of various other architectural and engineering firms are also located here as well as the Deutsches Architektur Zentrum (DAZ, German Architecture Center), an initiative of the BDA. It was developed in 2005 and has since put on events such as exhibitions, congresses, conventions, conferences, workshops and lectures in two halls and three seminar rooms. Furthermore, since 2009, a call has been put out for concrete ideas on how to make new use of the surrounding premises, where currently the restaurant-club and venue space Kiki Blofeld is located.

==== Spree-Carrée ====
The office and business site Spree-Carrée on Michaelkirchstraße 17/18 in Berlin-Mitte brings together a Gründerzeit-era building and a new building. During the restoration of the older building, efforts were made to preserve the historical character of the façade, with its typical glazed-brick facing. In the rental units, which are rented out by Bodenkontor Liegenschaften GmbH, there are various firms and businesses as well as a few social institutions, including the Deutscher Verein (German Association, de).

==== Josetti Courtyards ====
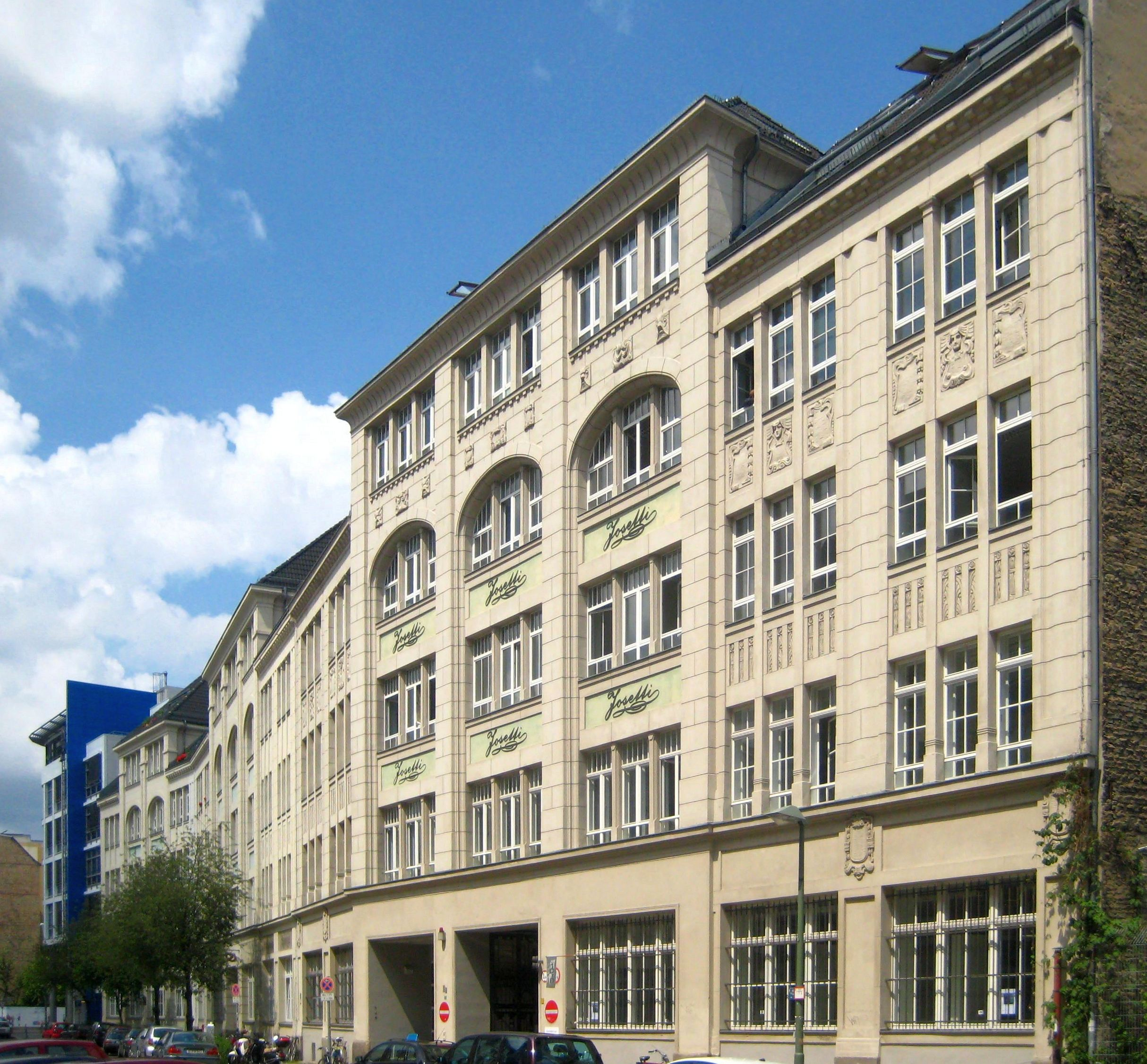
Façade of the Josetti Courtyards on Rungestraße

This structure is located on Rungerstraße 22–24 near Jannowitzbrücke. It was constructed in 1906 on a former wood storage site and consists of two complexes that extend to the river Spree and are listed as historical monuments. They present a challenging example for the characteristic trade complexes of Luisenstadt (de). Over the last century, these courtyards have been inhabited by a wood and metal processing plant, a cigarette factory belonging to the Jewish manufacturer Oskar Josetti (after whom the buildings are named), a documentary film studio, the GDR-era electronic chip manufacturer Robotron and, after the fall of the Berlin Wall, the Berlin Senate Administration for Finance.

The building complex is owned by Eurohypo, which has put 13,000 square metres (140,000 sq ft) of floorspace for rent since August 2004. Maintenance and management have been assigned to Beletage Immobilienkultur e. K. Over 260 distinct renters have taken up residence there, most of them working in the fields of design, art, culture and communication. In many cases these are self-employed workers, freelancers, small and expanding businesses as well as startup companies. Leases are signed with up to three months' notice for cancellation.

By the end of 2012 most of the leases with smaller startup companies were cancelled since the new owner Oceanis S.A. from Luxembourg was renting the complex to companies like Daimler-Benz and Fab.com.

==== Jannowitz-Center ====
The Jannowitz-Center was designed by the architectural firm Hentrich-Petschnigg & Partner (HPP) and built between 1994 and 1997. It is situated directly at Jannowitzbrücke, on Brückenstraße 5/6, across from the Chinese embassy. It consists of a modern office and business complex of 30,000m² (322,917sq.ft), into which mostly retail stores and medium-scale businesses have settled. Three out of the nine floors are being rented by Techniker Krankenkasse. The center is owned by Dazzle Zweite Berlin GmbH (based in Frankfurt am Main), which has contracted Tattersall Lorenz Immibilienverwaltung und -management GmbH for building maintenance.

== Planned or Ongoing Projects ==
Project descriptions largely based on the descriptions posted on the former mediaspree.de website

=== Northern Spree Riverfront from West to East ===
==== Columbus-Haus ====
Three eight-floor office blocks are to be erected at Stralauer Platz 35 under the name of Columbus-Haus. (The complex is not related to the Columbushaus that was formerly located on Potsdamer Platz.) The project involves three long, L-shaped building sections, which can also be built and sold separately. The street-facing façade would be built out of stone, while the river-facing one would be glasswork. The construction will leave a 10-metre-wide (33 ft) strip against the river for a planned riverfront footpath, which would nonetheless be covered by an overhang from the upper floors. The wood-plank rooftop terrace and the wooden pier in front of the offices is intended to recall a boat-deck, while an elevated setback is supposed to allude to a captain's deck. The internal configuration of the 1,600m² of floorspace is designed to be flexible.

The building permit for Columbus-Haus was issued in 2004 and extended in 2008. The original owner, Wayss & Freytag AG Projektenwicklung based in Frankfurt am Main, sold the premises and the building permit to a Spanish company. This company seems unlikely to carry out the office project, instead proposing a new, predominantly residential building application. Currently, the sport and cultural center YAAM (Young African Art Market) operates on the premises, serving and employing youth.

==== Postal service area with postal station ====
The postal area includes approximately 4.2 hectares (10 acres) of land near the Ostbahnhof station, bordered by the Straße der Pariser Kommune to the west, the railway tracks to the north, Mariane-von-Rantzau-Straße to the east and Mühlenstraße to the south. At the center of the premises stands a heritage-protected postal station (Postbahnhof), which was built between 1906 and 1908 using the design of the postal building councillor Wilhelm Tuckermann. It is 4,300 m² in size and includes two large mail loading rooms, a packing area, and a train shed. The spaces are mostly used as an event location for Fritz Club (operated by the youth-oriented radio broadcaster Fritz; de) as well as for concerts; nonetheless, exhibitions (such as Body Worlds) and various other events (e.g., Berlin Fashion Week) also take place there.

For the area surrounding the Postbahnhof, there are plans to create a new city neighborhood of offices, creative businesses, residences, hotels, leisure, dining, retail and retail-related services. They are supposed to be connected to the planned Park an der Spree (see below) with so-called Spreefenster ("Spree-Windows"). The land-use plan stipulates building blocks with heights of 26 m (85 ft) and 37 m (121 ft); however, two skyscraper buildings at 118 m (387 ft) and 96 m (315 ft) are also included. The citizens' initiative "Mediaspree versenken" has criticized the project especially for the dimensions of the structures, the resulting shadows cast on the area as well as the tiny residential section (16.6% of the total floor space).

==== Park an der Spree (Park on the Spree) ====
The Park an der Spree consists of a 2.1-hectare (5-acre) public green space, which will be located between the Postal Service Area (see above) and the river Spree. The Brommysteg (see below) is to be built at the eastern edge of the park. The park is understood to be a continuation of the adjoining eastern riverfront promenade at the East Side Gallery (see the East-Side-Park, above). It was commissioned by the Friedrichshain-Kreuzberg district authority and developed by the landscape-architecture firm Häfner/Jiménez. The building costs will amount to 620,000 Euros.

Much like the East-Side-Park promenade, this park is divided into two areas. Due to historical landmark protections, the wall and central patrol strip remains preserved. The space between the wall and the Spree will be arranged primarily as an extensive lawn; 80 Japanese cherry trees are to be planted towards the river. They will stand along the stretch of land above the edge of the riverbank and arranged in individual blocks. A boat pier for ship traffic is to be installed in the middle of the park. In the western part of the park, a "Globe-Theater" has been planned, which could be used by the circus and theatre company shake! already located on the premises.

==== East-Side-Tower ====
The East-Side-Tower is a planned residential high-rise building composed of upscale and exclusive condominium units. It is right next to the Warschauer Brücke. The property owner and project developer is city.bauten Gesellschaft für Projektentwicklung und -management mbH, and the blueprints are by nps tschoban voss GbR Architekten BDA.

The building's structure involves a 140-metre-long (460 ft) and 30-metre-high (98 ft) block with a 15-floor tower extending 67 m (220 ft) above. The building leaves a 10 m (33 ft) strip between itself and the Spree riverfront, and extends back to the Wall of the East-Side-Gallery with a minimal gap. Originally, the complex was supposed to include a chain of individual houses on the Spree riverfront, but those plans have already been retracted. Also, now that the redevelopment of the Brommybrücke (de) is planned to be an automobile-free footbridge (see below), the high-rise project has lost its municipal-planning rationale as a bridge-head. The café-bar Oststrand was located on the premises.

==== Anschutz-Gelände (Anschutz Grounds) ====
The so-called Anschutz-Gelände (Anschutz Grounds) have emerged in the area surrounding O₂ World, named the U.S. investor Philip F. Anschutz. This involves a city district with approximately 520,000 m² (5,600,000 sq.ft.) of leisure, sport, and recreational spaces as well retail stores, offices, and dwellings. For example, an "Entertainment-Center" is planned west of O₂ World, which is to house a "Currywurst Museum," among other things. Additionally, five high-rise buildings are slated for construction, measuring between 50 and 138 m (164 and 453 ft) tall; the majority of the other buildings will be approximately 28 m (92 ft) tall. Open spaces are not foreseen in the plans, apart from a children's playground.

==== Quartier in Orange ====
The Quartier in Orange is a project belonging to the BSR (de) and located at Mühlenstraße 9/10. By 2008, the only customer service center had moved into the new location; the headquarters are still in Tempelhof. According to the investor opinion, the terrain between the Oberbaumbrücke, the East Side Gallery, and O₂ World has potential for development and flexibly expandable. Additional buildings could be erected on various lots, which could create, for example, up to 4,000 m² (43,100 sq.ft.) of retail space.

==== NH-Hotel ====
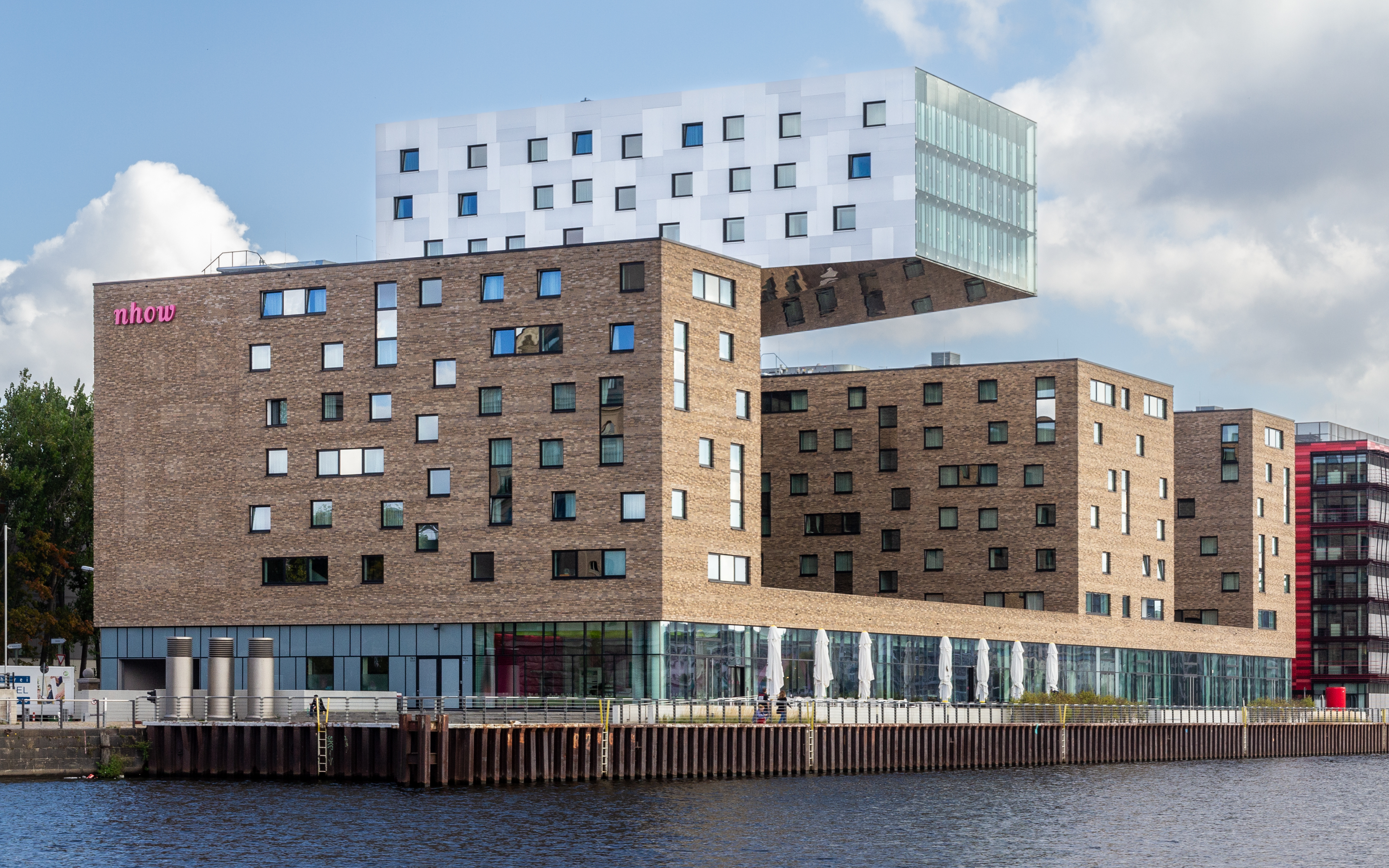
nhow-Hotel Berlin

Directly east of the erstwhile granary (see above), at Stralauer Allee 3, the Spanish company NH Hoteles is building a four-star hotel and convention center with approximately 385 rooms and 13 conference rooms. The NDC Nippon Development Corporation is acting as the project developer. The building was designed by the architectural firm nps tchoban voss and consists of two structures: a traditional substructure of perforated façades and metal cladding is topped by a glass superstructure that cantilevers out over the Spree. On the upper levels, there is a fitness center with rooftop access, and a restaurant with outdoor patio has been planned on the riverside. The project contradicts the approved building plans in several respects, but it is nonetheless currently underway. The opening is slated for 2010.

==== Hochhaus an der Elsenbrücke (High-Rise at the Elsenbrücke) ====
The open spaces of the East Harbor (Osthafen, de), along Stralauer Allee 3–16, are to be filled with a dense chain of 20- and 24-m (65- and 79-ft) high buildings. A 90 m (300 ft) tower is planned at the Elsenbrücke (de) bridge, which is supposed to form a "city gate" with Allianz Versicherung's (de) Treptowers across the bridge. Initial building permits were awarded to the owner BEHALA (de), at which point it sold the lots in question to investors. However, the land-use plans for the East Harbor have not been settled. The citizen's initiative Mediaspree versenken is especially opposed to the high-rise plans and the densely packed development projects on the riverside. Since July 2008, the initiative has been partly supported by the district assembly (Bezirksverordnetenversammlung) of Friedrichshain-Kreuzberg, which has pledged to fight against the construction of the high-rise at the Elsenbrücke.

=== Southern Spree Riverfront from East to West ===
==== Fanny-Zobel-Straße ====
The site at Fanny-Zobel-Straße 13–21 is situated between the Treptowers and the TwinTowers. It remains undeveloped to date and was acquired by Dritte Adler Real Estate GmbH & Co. KG. The development process is currently underway; plans include a public park, a playground, residential, industry, and office buildings, as well as a hotel.

==== Yachthafen am Osthafen (Yacht Harbor at the East Harbor) ====
Incorporating the former border-safety pier, which extends out for more than a 100 m (330 ft).) from the East Harbor (Osthafen), a marina is to be built on the Spree, with a club house and a so-called Spreebalkon ("Spree balcony"). Additionally, a bar-lounge as well as a landing for water-taxis and liner boats is in the works. Arena Berlin (de) had a corresponding design prepared by architects Grazyna and Jerzy Wilk.

==== Neuen Spreespeicher (New Spree Warehouses) ====
At the corner of Cuvrystraße with Schlesiche Straße, IVG Immobilien AG is planning the Neuen Spreespeicher (New Spree Warehouses). The approximately 10,000 m² (107,640 sq.ft.) property was recently in use as a flea market. The newly planned buildings will involve two 160 m-long (525 ft.), five-floor buildings with three additional setback floors. They are to be built in the traditional Kontorhausstil (German office-building style) and will open out onto the Spree. Planned building use includes office-lofts, small-scale retail, and food service. The building permit for this project expired at the end of November 2008 and was extended for an additional year. Further details about current plans are not known.

==== Doppelkaianlage May-Ayim-Ufer (Double Quay Landing May-Ayim-Riverside) ====
The 1895 double-pier Gröbenufer (today the May-Ayim-Riverside) as well as the catacombs connected to it were both refurbished and renovated as historical monuments between January 2007 and December 2009. A culinary or cultural use such as an exhibition-space is planned after the completion of the renovation work. Landings for water-taxis and ferries are planned for the publicly accessible piers. Also, the significance of the Quay Landing as a memorial site for victims of the Berlin Wall will be highlighted with an information board. An artistically designed signal mast will at the center of the facility the lighthouse that used to stand there before being destroyed during the Second World War. The project will be implemented within the scope of the urban renewal funding program Stadtumbau West (de). Total costs will amount to approximately 2.5 million Euros.

==== Brommysteg (Brommy Footbridge) ====
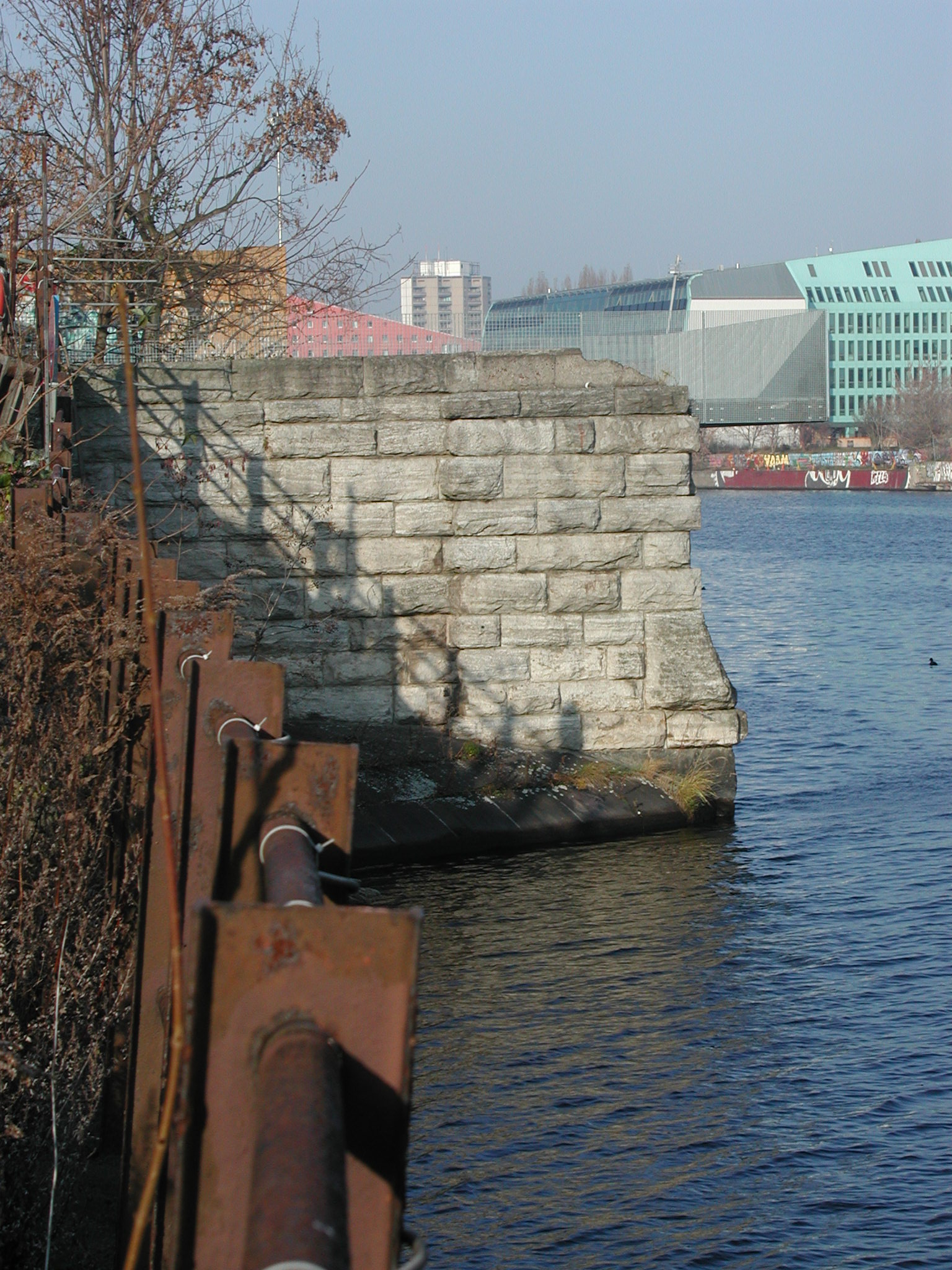
Restored part of the former Brommybrücke – the "Spreebalkon"

Until 1945, there was another Spree crossing halfway between the Schillingbrücke (de) and the Oberbaumbrücke – the Brommybrücke (de). It was under construction from 1907 to 1909 and was blown up by the Nazis during the Second World War, in order to impede the advancing Red Army. A reconstruction of the Brommybrücke was planned during the course of the Mediaspree project, but, after public protests and a successful referendum against it, the plans were retracted. The latest plans foresee a temporary "artistic footbridge." This would be constructed from simple scaffolding with wooden planks and would offer several platforms and space for rest and relaxation, as well as for events and functions. As part of the structure, two towers will be available for media projections and video installations. The construction costs are predicted to be less than one million Euros.

Alternatively, there exist various other blueprints, such as one by the architect Gerhard Spangenberg for an inhabitable Brommy Bridge at 14.5 million Euros. And in the case that the Brommybrücke is rebuilt as a footbridge, there are plans to erect an additional street-bridge for buses and streetcars about 200 m (660 ft) away, at Manteuffelstraße. The citizen's initiative Mediaspree versenken fears a later opening for automobile traffic and a drastic increase in traffic volume in the neighboring residential areas.

==== Viktoria-Speicher I (Victoria-Warehouse I) ====
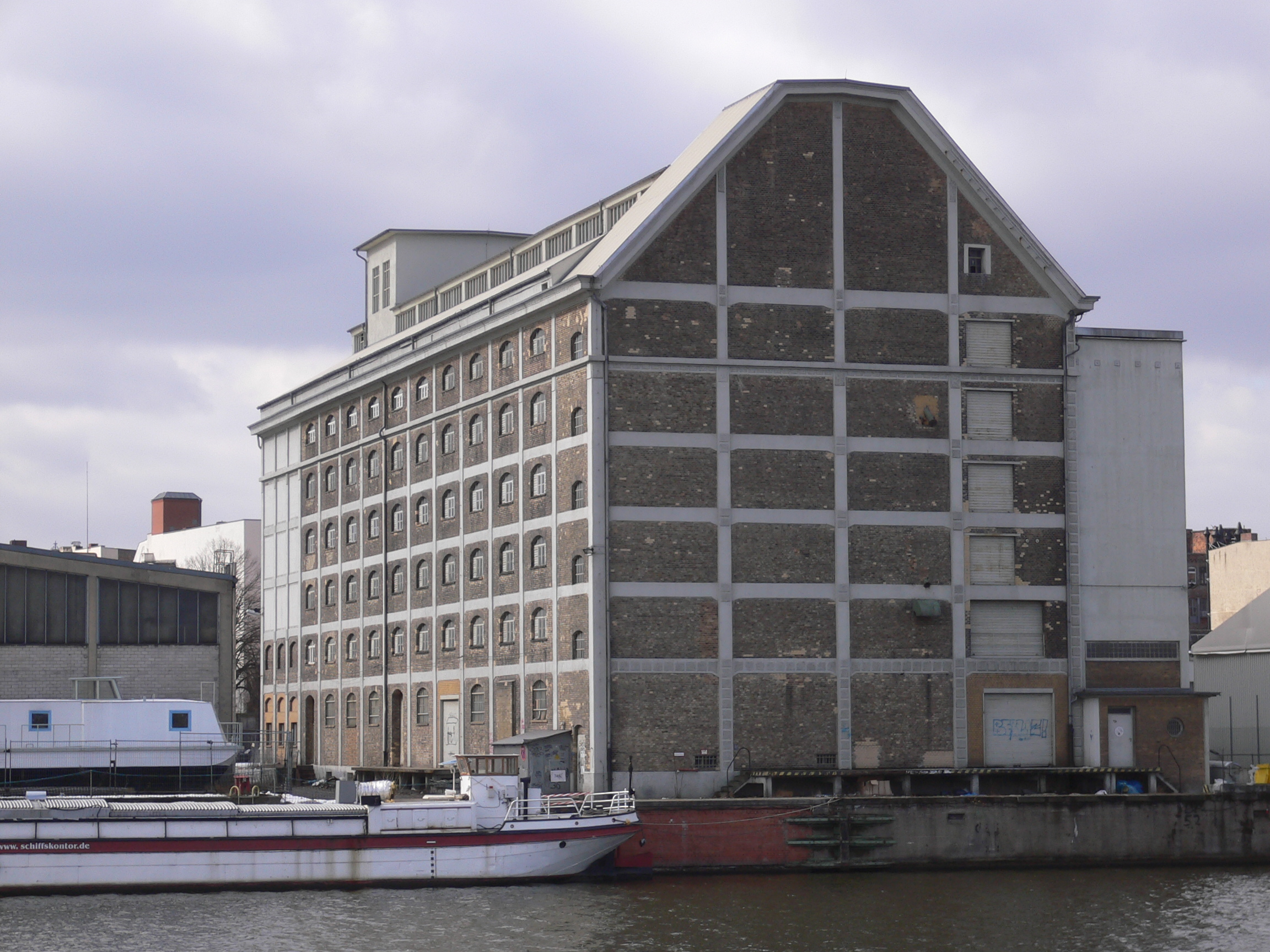
The Viktoriaspeicher I from the side facing the Spree

Measuring 300 by 140 m (980 by 460 ft), the grounds around the Viktoria-Speicher (Victoria Warehouse) have an area of approximately 4.2 hectares (450,000 ft^{2}). It is located at Köpenicker Straße 20a-29 and is bounded by the Schillingbrücke to the west, the Spree to the north, the former velvet factory to the east (see above), and Köpenicker Straße to the south. Built by Franz Ahrens in 1910, several one-storey halls are located on the property, although it was dubbed the Victoria Warehouse. It is a listed historical monument, protected as an example of industrial architecture.

The halls are used by about 20 to 30 firms, who have rented the units out from the property owner, BEHALA. For example, the building materials merchant Dämmisol established sale and storage spaces there. Since BEHALA wishes to sell the property to the highest bidder in the within the scope of the Mediaspree project, the existing rental contracts were cancelled. This could only happen by 31 December 2008, at the latest.

In the course of the re-planning, the halls could have been torn down. The Victoria Warehouse was restored in February 2009. It is now the centerpiece of a new district center, with shops and cultural establishments. It is to be inaugurated in April 2009 and made accessible by water. In addition, an urban design exists awaiting the decision to set up a development plan. It comes from the architectural firm Mola Winkelmüller and includes a riverside promenade, bands of green space, and a multi-storey building.

==== Spreeport ====
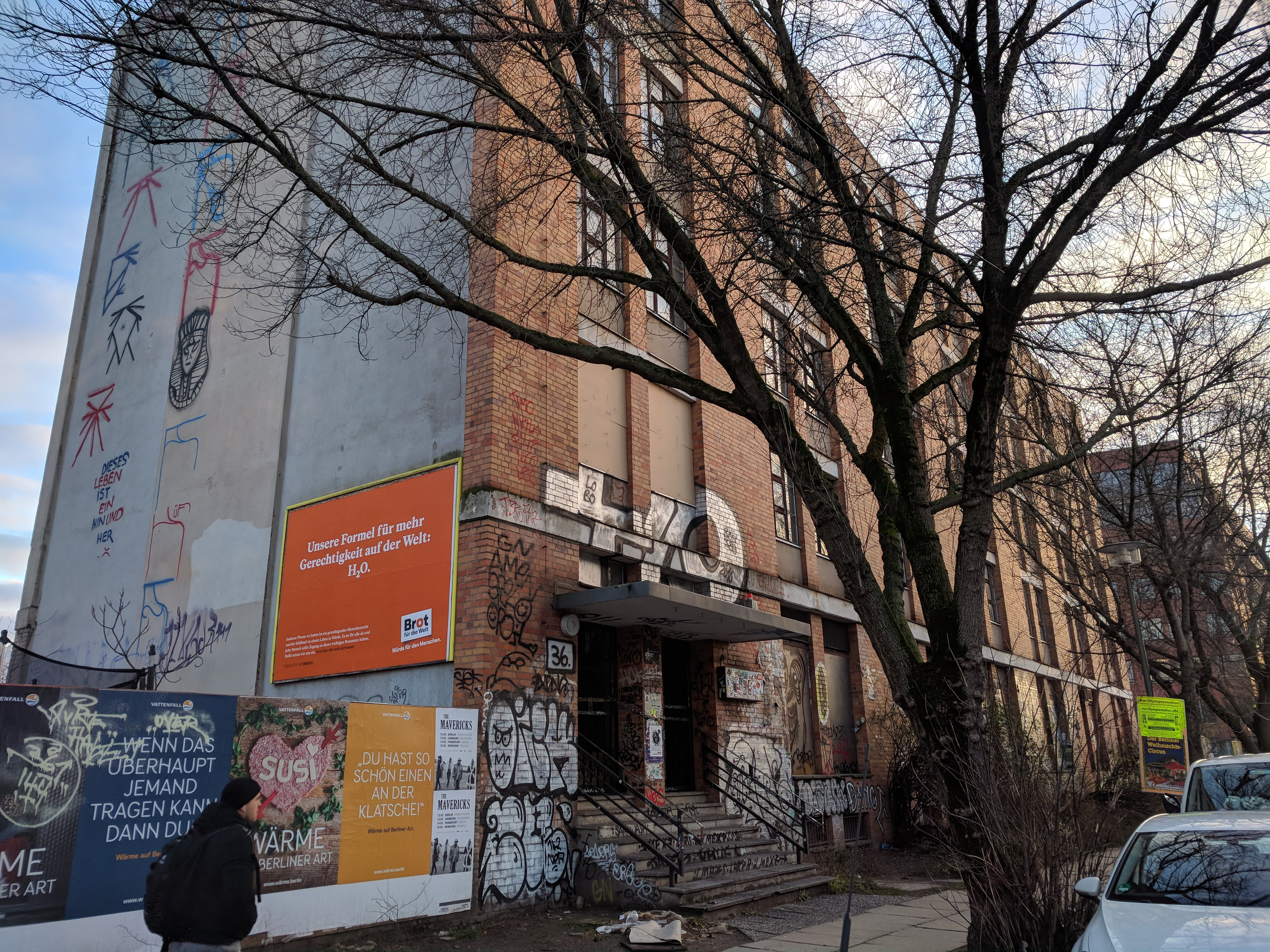
Spreeport - Köpernicker Strasse 36

Spreeport is a large-scale project by HOCHTIEF Construction AG in cooperation with A.L.E.X. Bau GmbH and Kilian Projektmanagement Berlin GmbH. It involves the area at Paula-Thiede-Ufer between the Eisfabrik (see below) and Engeldamm. The first building phase—the ver.di office buildings—were completed in July 2004; the second building phase is currently underway at Köpenicker Straße 36–38. The building was invaded by leftists in 2016. It was still standing in December 2017. In the 19th century, wood markets and lumber yards as well as limestone sheds were located at this point on the Spree; in the 20th century, an industrialized building was erected here. Now, new office and industrial buildings are to be built here, along with residences, rental apartments and boarding houses. These are to be offered primarily to information technology, biotechnology and "high-tech" firms as well as remote workers.

==== Eisfabrik (Ice Factory) ====
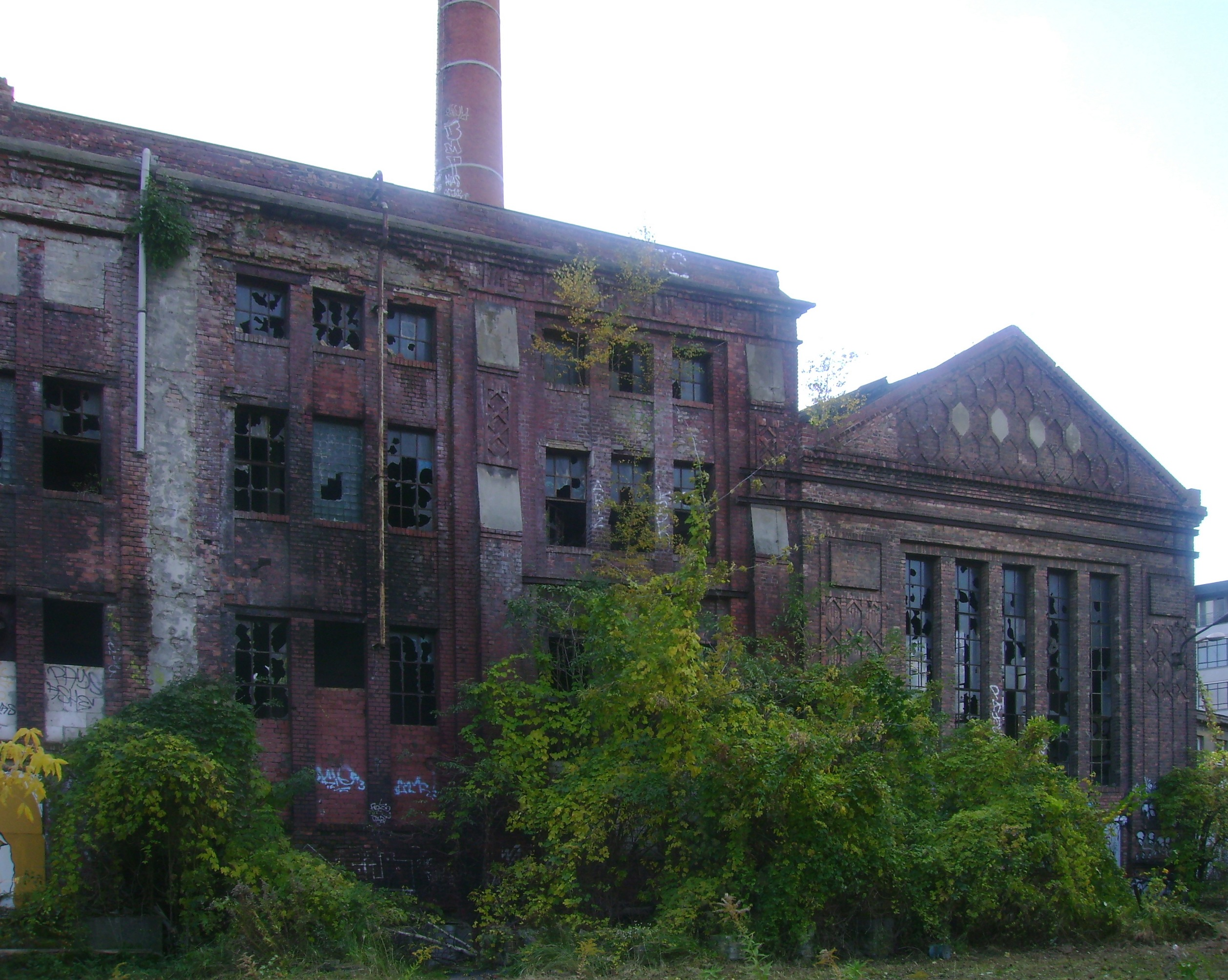
Façade of the Eisfabrik

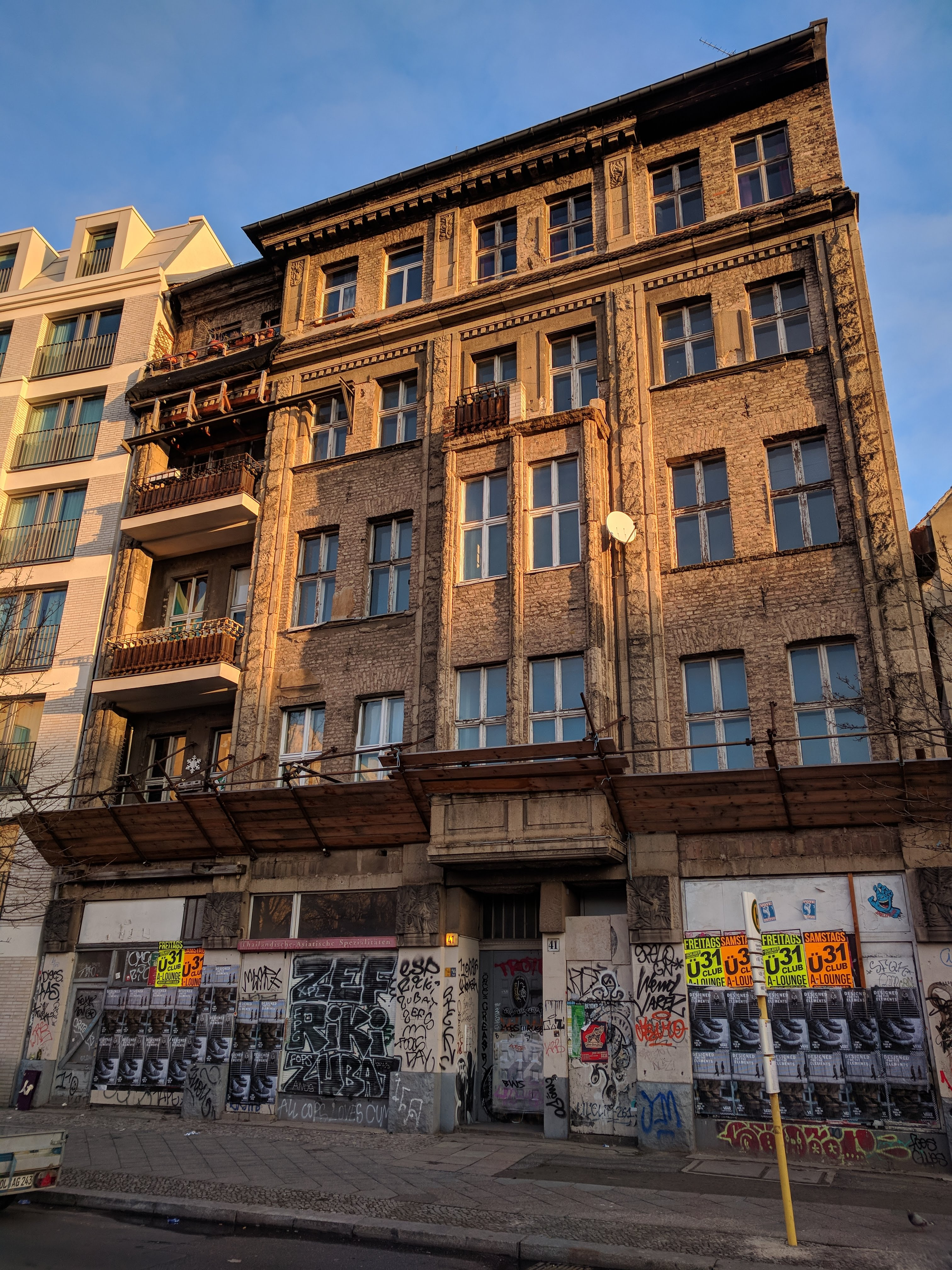
Façade of Köpenicker Straße 41 (Eisfabrik) from street

The former Eisfabrik (de), belonging to Norddeutsche Eiswerke AG is situated at Köpenicker Straße 40/41 and is one of the oldest standing factories in Germany. Artificial ice was produced here from 1896 to 1995. The approximately 11,000 m² (107,640 sq.ft.) complex consists of two courtyards with residential and industrial complexes. This also includes three cold storage warehouses as well as a boiler and machine room, which features clear, neoclassical red-brick architecture in the early modern style.

In 1995, Treuhand Liegenschaftsgesellschaft Immobilien (TLG) took over the management of the building. In November 2008, it sold the heritage-protected ice factory to TELAMON GmbH from Bochum. This company also owns Radialsystem V, situated on the opposite bank of the Spree, and it is currently having an extensive inventory and detailed planning carried out. The already-concrete 2005 demolition plans of the architect Ivan Reimann, which proposed a new glass building, seems to be off the table. A citizen's initiative has been established for the preservation of the ice factory. It is not yet clear when the restoration of the ice factory will commence. It is certain, though, that future usage will be based in the creative industries.

The residential complexes on Köpenicker Straße as well as the (cold storage) warehouses at the rear of the area remain in the possession of TLG Immobilien. For the currently filed plans, there is a building permit that includes authorization for the demolition of the historical cold storage warehouses. Future usage has not yet been established for these areas, but the construction of a new office building is scheduled, which will be composed of new buildings and pre-existing residential buildings.

== Other Items in the Mediaspree Area ==
=== Northern Spree Riverfront from West to East ===
- Jannowitzbrücke Station, S-Bahn and U-Bahn, between Holzmarktstraße and Jannowitzbrücke, part of the city viaducts, designated as technological landmark
- Bar25, Holzmarktstraße 25, Hostel, Café and Restaurant
- Main pumping station of the Berliner Wasserbetriebe (Berlin Water Utility), Holzmarktstraße 32, pumping station and the headquarters of the Leit- und Informationssystems Abwasser (LISA)
- Berlin Ostbahnhof, Koppenstraße 3, long-distance, regional, and Berlin S-Bahn station with a shopping arcade, connected office complex and InterCityHotel
- Maria am Ostbahnhof (de), Stralauer Platz 33/34, club and event location
- Young African Art Market (YAAM), Stralauer Platz 35, sports and cultural center, dedicated to youth employment
- Speicher, Mühlenstraße 78–80, discothèque and restaurant, formerly a mill and granary (Mühlenstraße = "Mill Street")
- East-Side-Gallery, Mühlenstraße, 1.3 km long section of the Berlin Wall, the largest open air gallery in the world
- former Höhere Webeschule (Higher Weaver's School), Warschauer Platz 6–8, protected as a historical landmark on the western edge of the new Oberbaum-City, in use since 2006 by the Fachhochschule für Technik und Wirtschaft

=== Southern Spree Riverfront from East to West ===
- Club der Visionäre, Am Flutgraben 2, café and event location
- Kunstfabrik am Flutgraben, Am Flutgraben 3, art and cultural association
- Freischwimmer, Vor dem Schlesischen Tor 2, bar and restaurant, formerly a boat rental und workshop
- Coffeehouse Zur Pumpe, Vor dem Schlesischen Tor 3, former Steuerhaus der Königlichen Wasserinspektion (Wheelhouse of the Royal Water Inspection) and the sole remaining excise house on the Lohmühleninsel (Bark Mill Island), protected as a historical landmark
- Aral gas station, oldest preserved gas station in Berlin, protected as a historical landmark
- Otto Rauhut GmbH & Co., Schleusenufer 4, woodwork und factory
- Zapf-Umzüge, Köpenicker Straße 14, to date the headquarters of Europe's largest moving company, although it is likely to move out soon
- Kiki Blofeld, Köpenicker Straße 48/49, garden-club and event locale, former bunker-boathouse
- former soap factory, Köpenicker Straße 50–52
- Schwarzer Kanal (Black Canal), Michaelkirchstraße 22/23, wagon fort
- Electrical Plant Berlin-Mitte, Köpenicker Straße 59–73, combined gas and steam-turbine electrical plant with power-heat coupling

=== Bridges Over the Spree from West to East ===
- Jannowitzbrücke (de)
- Michaelbrücke (de)
- Schillingbrücke (de)
- Oberbaumbrücke
- Elsenbrücke (de)

== Criticism ==
The Mediaspree project has been subject to extensive critique. It is feared that, among other things, longtime residents will be displaced by rising maintenance costs, which will come about by virtue of the deliberate gentrification of the surrounding residential areas. The term Aufwertung ("Valorization"), used in this context as a synonym for cost increases and cultural change, has been deemed misleading rhetoric.

Likewise, criticism is also directed at the privatization of public space and the Stadtumbau von oben (urban development from above), by which the interests and concerns of neighboring residents are not taken into account. There is talk of "part-privatized urban politics", whereby the property association "Mediaspree" understands itself first and foremost as a point of contact for projects and investors and shows hardly any interest in the opinion of residents, while the necessary infrastructure for the Mediaspree, such as streets, bridges, and lighting, are financed by public funds. This refers to things such as the subsidies in the millions of Euros, with which newly arrived businesses such as MTV Central and Universal Music were supported by the Berlin Senate. Furthermore, some have felt it irrational that the Senate welcomed and financed the building of O₂ World, although there was no shortage of event spaces. After the Basketball team Alba Berlin made O₂ World its new home stadium, the drop in occupancy rates at their former home stadium, Max-Schmeling-Halle in Prenzlauer Berg, must now be mitigated through publicly funded subsidies.

The restructuring of wild-growing sections of the Spree is similarly coming under criticism. The now-smaller and narrower publicly accessible riverfront areas are criticized for being mostly under video surveillance. Fears of a billboard-covered parking lot at the East Side Gallery have, in the eyes of critics, already come true. They cannot understand how a 45 m (148 ft) section of the East Side Gallery was removed for O₂ World's projection screens as well as its pier for pleasure boats and water-taxis, despite protection as a historical monument.

Subcultural groups lament the displacement of numerous alternative cultural projects such as the Schwarzer Kanal ("Black Canal"; de), Köpi, YAAM—and many other already-demolished establishments such as Ostgut, Casino, or RazzleDazzle—in favor of large, commercial event establishments and businesses. In their opinion, this development comes at the loss of cultural diversity.

A further point of critique was the recognition of Mediaspree e.V. as a non-profit organization, despite it only accepting investors and property owners as members. It was the view of critics that behind the goal of ensuring long-term and ongoing development towards an effective and attractive business and cultural habitat, hid the implementation of merely private-economy interests. Moreover, the work of the association was supported by public funds. With the expiry of this funding and the dissolution of the association on 31 December 2008, this criticism has become obsolete.

A rise in through-traffic has arisen as a result of the new event arena, O₂ World, which has likewise been criticized by protesters. They nonetheless managed to have the accompanying plans for the reconstruction of the Brommybrücke (see above) as a street bridge suspended—for now.

== Protests ==
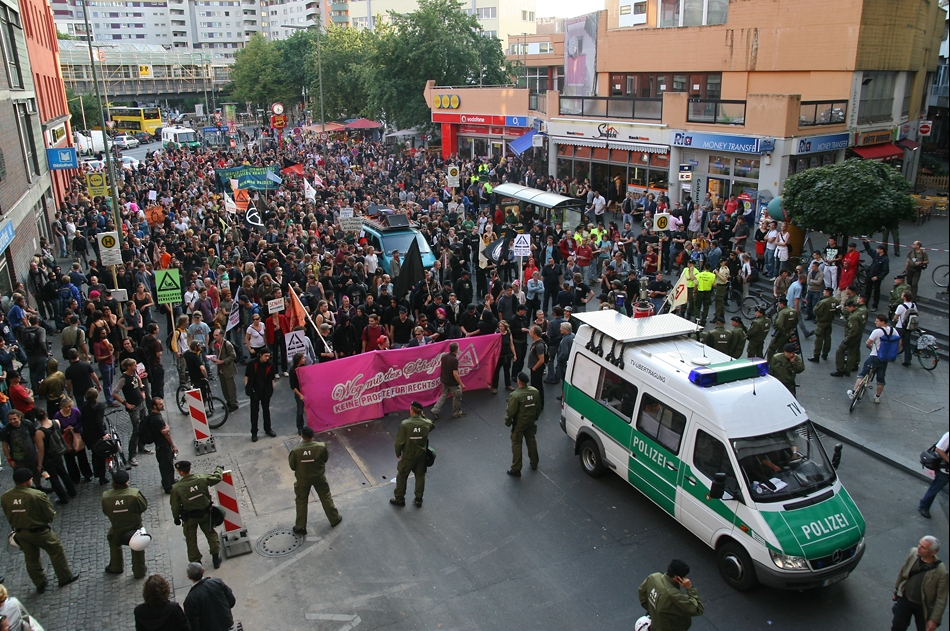
Anti-Mediaspree-Demonstration in Kreuzberg, September 2008

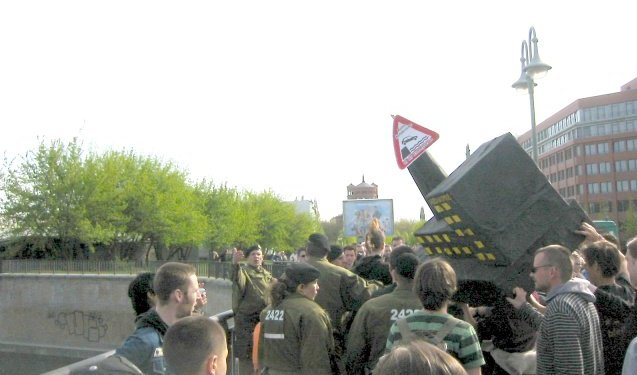
The desired symbolic sinking of the Mediaspree on the Michaelbrücke bridge during a neighborhood walk, 22 April 2007

To date, there have been numerous protest campaigns against the urban restructuring plans, which were supported by institutions such as the Hedonist International (de), the Fuckparade and the Transgenialer CSD (de; a "positive" alternative to the Christopher Street Day parade), as well as a successful municipal referendum.

=== Mediaspree Versenken (Sink Mediaspree) Citizen's Initiative ===
Logo of the Mediaspree versenken initiative

The protests were primarily coordinated by the "Mediaspree versenken" Bürgerinitiative (citizen's initiative), which was founded by the architect Carsten Joost, among others. Under the slogan Spreeufer für alle! ("Spree riverfront for all!"), the Bündnis Informationsveranstaltungen für Anwohner (The "Informational Events for Residents" Alliance) organized so-called "neighborhood walks" against the project and led a citizen's campaign for the co-determination of the Spree riverfront.

The initiative group consists of the pragmatically oriented AG Spreeufer and the rather radical left-wing AG SpreepiratInnen. The group sees itself as a lobbyist for those who want the Spree riverfront to be a green space and a cultural space with varied uses. Their principal demands call for a minimum distance of 50 m (160 ft) for all new buildings, the adherence to Berlin's building height of 22 m (72 ft), and a pedestrian/cyclist bridge rather than a street bridge. Furthermore, existing buildings should be integrated to an open-space concept and supplemented by pavilions for public use. The remaining land available for construction should be parceled out in such a way as to not only reduce the number of large property investors, but also to facilitate the engagement of other users—especially non-commercial, cultural initiatives. The initiative group also accuses the district of privatizing public property.

From the point of view of the citizen's initiative, the plans for Mediaspree are squandering an historical opportunity to develop the riverfront zone as recreational space with high proportions of free space. According to them, the planned riverfront trail and pocket parks are not sufficient for a city with a population in the millions, like Berlin (3.4 million, as of 2010). The entire project is perceived as an investment in the high-end sector, primarily about profitable riverfront development with a privatized view of the river Spree, while the social realm is neglected. It is feared that the planned "valorization" of the area will lead to rising rents, anti-social urban development, and cultural extinction.

=== "Spreeufer für alle!” (Spree riverfront for all!) Referendum ===
On 13 July 2008, a referendum was held against the plans for Mediaspree, which called for a 50-metre-wide (160 ft) strip of free space and the abandonment of the construction of both high-rises and the planned automobile bridge over the Spree. The required number of supporting signatures was reached five months ahead of schedule and was submitted to the borough of Friedrichshain-Kreuzberg on 4 March 2008. The following referendum drew a voter turnout of 19.1%, which was well over the required threshold of 15%. A clear majority (87%) supported the alternative proposals of the Mediaspree versenken initiative. According to the organization Mehr Demokratie (More Democracy), this was the most successful Berlin citizens' movement to date. The result is not binding, however. While the district associations for the SPD and the Green Party subsequently demanded that the citizens' wishes be carried out as soon as possible, the Urban Development Senator, Ingeborg Junge-Reyer assured investors that she would protect the Mediaspree plans.

According to data from the district authority, the implementation of the referendum would cost 164.7 million Euro in compensation to Investors. The citizens' initiative rejects this estimate as false, since the stated costs were based on the value of the entire area of the Spree riverfront affected by the referendum while the referendum itself merely referred to the new construction sites.

=== Demonstrations ===
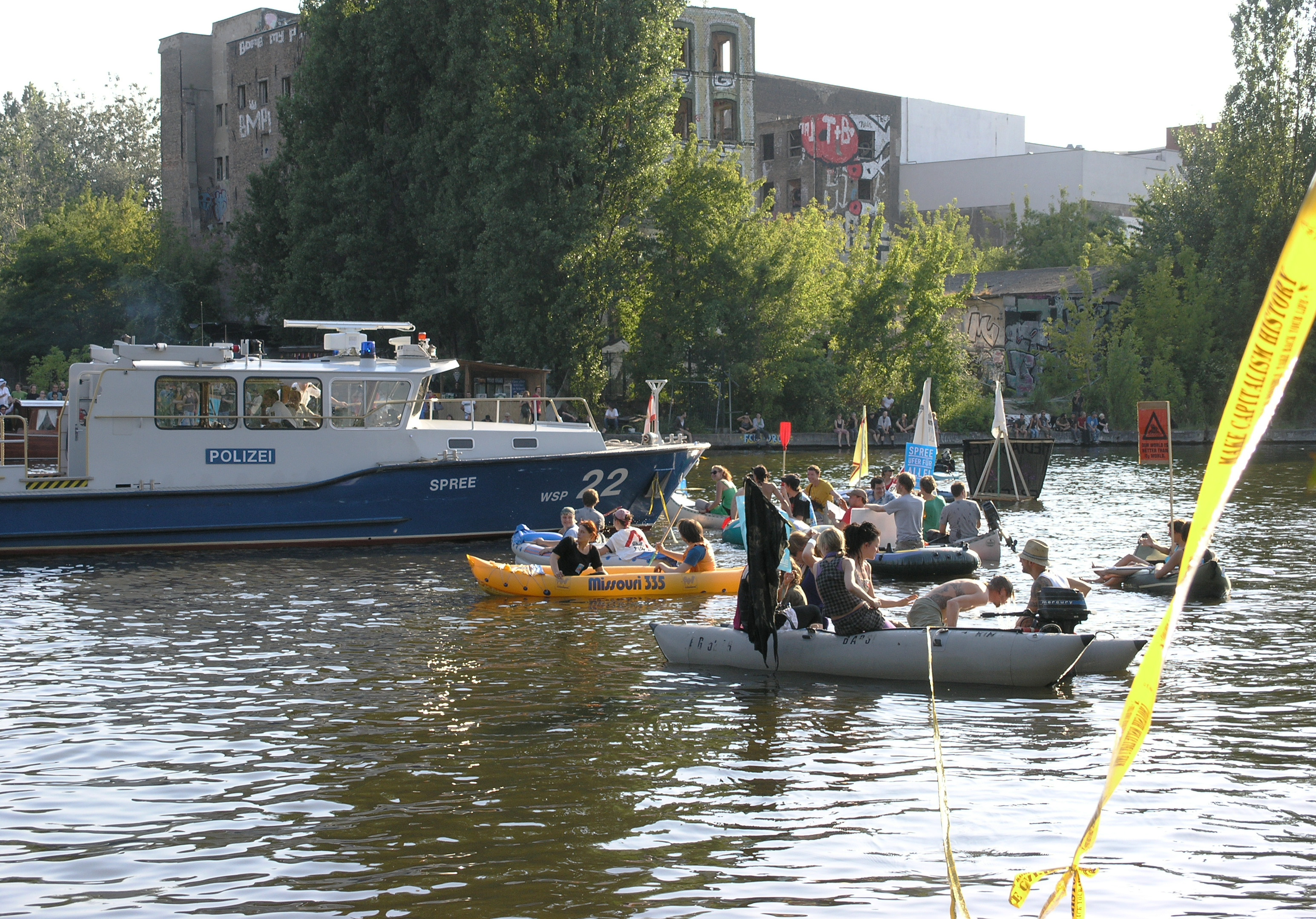
Demonstration against Mediaspree, 1 July 2008

Using the term Kiezspaziergang (neighborhood stroll), numerous demonstrations took place through Friedrichshain and Kreuzberg, which provided information on the various stages of urban restructuring and focused on the theme of gentrification. Additionally, there were many bicycle protests around the Mediaspree area.

Also causing a stir was the Investorenbejubeln (Investors' Celebration), a demonstration on the river Spree in which protestors used rubber dinghies and paddle boats to follow a boat-cruise of Mediaspree investors, which was then broken off prematurely.

Approximately 5000 people assembled for the "Spree Parade" (Spreeparade), a mass protest held in the lead-up to the referendum to which many organizations and temporary tenants of the Spree riverfront made reference.

Around 1500 people protested on 10 September 2008, against the opening of O₂ World, which was blocked off by a massive police presence.

One year after the referendum, a demonstration was held on 11 July 2009 against the "commercialization and privatization" of the Spree riverfront, organized by the Megaspree-Aktinosbündnis (Megaspree Action Coalition), made up of residents, political groups, and cultural projects. According to data released by the organizers, approximately 8000 people took part in the protest. One year later, on 20 July 2010, approximately 5000 people came out to protest for the "Megaspree-Demonstration" against the Mediaspree, gentrification, and the "concretization" (Zubetonierung) of Berlin.

Demonstrations against Mediaspree also carried on in the year 2010. On 6 June 2010, approximately 2000 people turned out in protest against Mediaspree, under the slogan "Mediaspree entern" (Board the Mediaspree).

=== Art Projects ===
In opposition to the Mediaspree project, there arose in 2007 a music and video project with the activist Fatma Souad in Friedrichshain-Kreuzberg. This queer rap song portrayed a political stroll through particular Berlin locales, giving a critical description of the corresponding urban development.

Four short films were produced in 2008 for a competition, using the motto "Mediaspree wegspotten!" (Mock away the Mediaspree!), which engaged critically with the project and promoted the referendum.

The Neukölln trio, The Incredible Herrengedeck, criticized the Mediaspree in their song, Nee Nee Nee (No, No, No).

The artist duo, Varsity of Maneuvers, used their canoe project, "Spreeverinselung" (The Isolation of the Spree), to focus on the physical (in)accessibility and regulation of the Spree area, that generally excluded local residents and Berliners.

== Reactions ==
The borough of Friedrichshain-Kreuzberg already reacted to the Mediaspree with the citizens' movement "Spreeufer für alle!", which accommodated the initiators through a separate proposal that was put to a vote (see above). In direct comparison, voters preferred the initiators' alternative.

The referendum is not binding. Nonetheless, the borough has retreated from some of its Mediaspree plans. Thus, the new high-rise at the Elsenbrücke has been abandoned, and a bicycle- and footbridge will be built over the Spree, instead of the planned road bridge. This partially accommodates the central demands of the citizens' movement. In September 2008, a special committee was constituted, in which members of various factions and the citizens' initiative "Mediaspree versenken" could discuss possible changes to development projects in light of the referendum.

The demands for a 50 m wide strip of free space along the riverfront was also pursued. Thus a compromise is possible with the property company that owns the property where Maria am Ostbahnhof is located: the strip of riverfront there will now be 20 or 30 meters wide (instead of the initially planned 10 m) and will provide space for a small park. At the end of February 2009, however, the Berlin Senate stepped into the negotiations. It feared indemnity claims on the part of investors, should the development plans be altered, and had "grave misgivings" (schwere Bedenken) against the abandonment of the high-rise project at the Elsenbrücke. On these grounds, it threatened to revoke the borough's rights for independent urban planning. Mediaspree, the CDU and the FDP as well as the Chamber of Industry and Commerce welcomed this move, while the "Mediaspree versenken" initiative feared the loss of strategic leverage, since they only could exert influence over the borough (and not the entire city-state).
