= Techniker Krankenkasse =

German statutory health insurance provider

- Industry: Health insurance
- Founded: August 3, 1884; 141 years ago
- Headquarters: Hamburg, Germany
- Area served: Germany
- Key people: Jens Baas (chairman); Thomas Ballast (deputy chairman); Karen Walkenhorst (boardmember)
- Revenue: ▲€69.2 billion (2026)
- Number of employees: 15,702 (2025)
- Website: www.tk.de/en

The Techniker Krankenkasse (TK) is the largest health insurance organization in Germany, providing general insurance as required by law compared to private health insurance companies. The TK is a Körperschaft des öffentlichen Rechts, meaning it's legally not a public company but its organization is defined by the Sozialgesetzbuch Fünftes Buch federal law. Since September 2016, the TK is also branding itself as Die Techniker.

== Finances ==
The TK has about 9.6 million paying insured members and 2.7 million insured members who do not have to pay contributions as they are family members of paying insurance members. This adds up to a budget in 2026 of 53.8 billion euros for health insurance, 12.8 billion euros for long-term care insurance and 2.7 billion euros for payments under the Arbeitgeberaufwendungsausgleichsgesetz, for which public health insurance organizations in Germany are also responsible.

In 2024, the ratio of income to expenditure at TK resulted in a deficit of 1.465 billion euros.

The contribution rate has been 17.29% of the brutto income since 1 January 2026, thus following the general trend of rising contribution rates for public health insurance in Germany, but is still below the average of around 17.5% in 2026.

== Controversies ==
Despite the evidence that homeopathy has no medical benefit, the TK has been the first public health insurance in Germany to offer homeopathy as part of its benefits package since 2009. A study published in 2017 based on data from the TK shows that patients treated with homeopathy cause up to 20% higher costs to the insurance company.
