= Grosser =

Grosser or Großer is the masculine nominative singular form of the German adjective "gross", meaning "big", "great", "large", "tall", and the like. It is part of many placenames, especially of mountains. It is also a surname. People with that surname include:

- Alfred Grosser (1925–2024), German-French writer, sociologist, and political scientist
- Arthur Grosser (active from 1987), Canadian physical chemist and actor
- Jamey Grosser, American motorcycle racer
- Jorge Grosser (born 1945), Chilean runner
- Lily Grosser (1894–1968), German-French activist
- Maximilian Großer (born 2001), German footballer
- Maurice Grosser (1903–1986), American painter, art critic, and writer
- Pamela Großer (born 1977), German actress
- Peter Grosser (1938–2021), German football player and coach
- Philip Grosser (1890–1933), Ukrainian-American anarchist and anti-militarist
- Thomas Grosser (1965–2008), German footballer
- Tim Grosser (born 1942), Australian cricketer

== See also ==
- Gross (disambiguation)
- Groser
