= Black school (Netherlands) =

The terms white and black schools are used to describe the ethnic composition of primary and secondary schools in the Netherlands. In Flanders, so-called "black schools" are referred to as concentratieschool, or "concentrated schools".

== Definition ==
The term began being used in the 1970s. There is no official definition for what constitutes a white or black school, though several unofficial definitions exist.

The most commonly used definition is based on the percentage of cultural minorities in the school population. In this circumstance, "cultural minorities" are considered students in which one parent is born in the Moluccans, Suriname, Aruba, Netherlands Antilles, Southern Europe and its environs (Turkey, Greece, Spain, Portugal, former Yugoslavia, Morocco, Tunisia or Cabo Verde), another non-English speaking country outside Europe (excluding Indonesia), or were admitted under the Aliens Act. In 2003, for example, Statistics Netherlands defined a school as "black" if more than 60% of students are cultural minorities, "mixed" if it was between 30-60% and "white" if the population was 30% or under. This definition is largely used by mass media as well.

Another definition involves the percentage of non-Western migrant background. Non-Western in this context means that the student (or their parents) were born in Africa, Latin America or Asia (excluding Indonesia and Japan). In 2006, for example, Statistics Netherlands deemed a school "black" if more than 50% of the population come from a non-Western migrant background and "white" if it was less than 50% of the school population.

=== International schools ===
There is a difference in terminology and perception between "black schools" and international schools, the latter defined more as schools in big cities that are populated by students of expatriates from Belgium, Germany, France, the United Kingdom, Japan, Russia and the United States. Parents of these students are often short-term businesspeople in the country or diplomats in country^{.}

== Education segregation ==
Schools with special education programs and a high percentage of cultural minorities are eligible for additional government funding. Since 2019, the country of birth for parents has also played a role in funding.

Nevertheless, some parents prefer "white schools" in their neighborhood due to the (perceived) higher quality education. This is similar to the American concept of white flight, and leads to educational segregation in communities.

In response, several municipalities have tried to reduce educational segregation through dispersion policies. In cities like Nijmegen and Deventer this is implemented for primary schools, in Amsterdam it is both primary and secondary schools. Limited distribution policies also exist in The Hague, Utrecht and Rotterdam.

== See also ==
- Gewichtenregeling
- Gelijke Onderwijskansen
