= World Food Festival =

Coordinates: 51°54′55.17″N 4°28′18.93″E

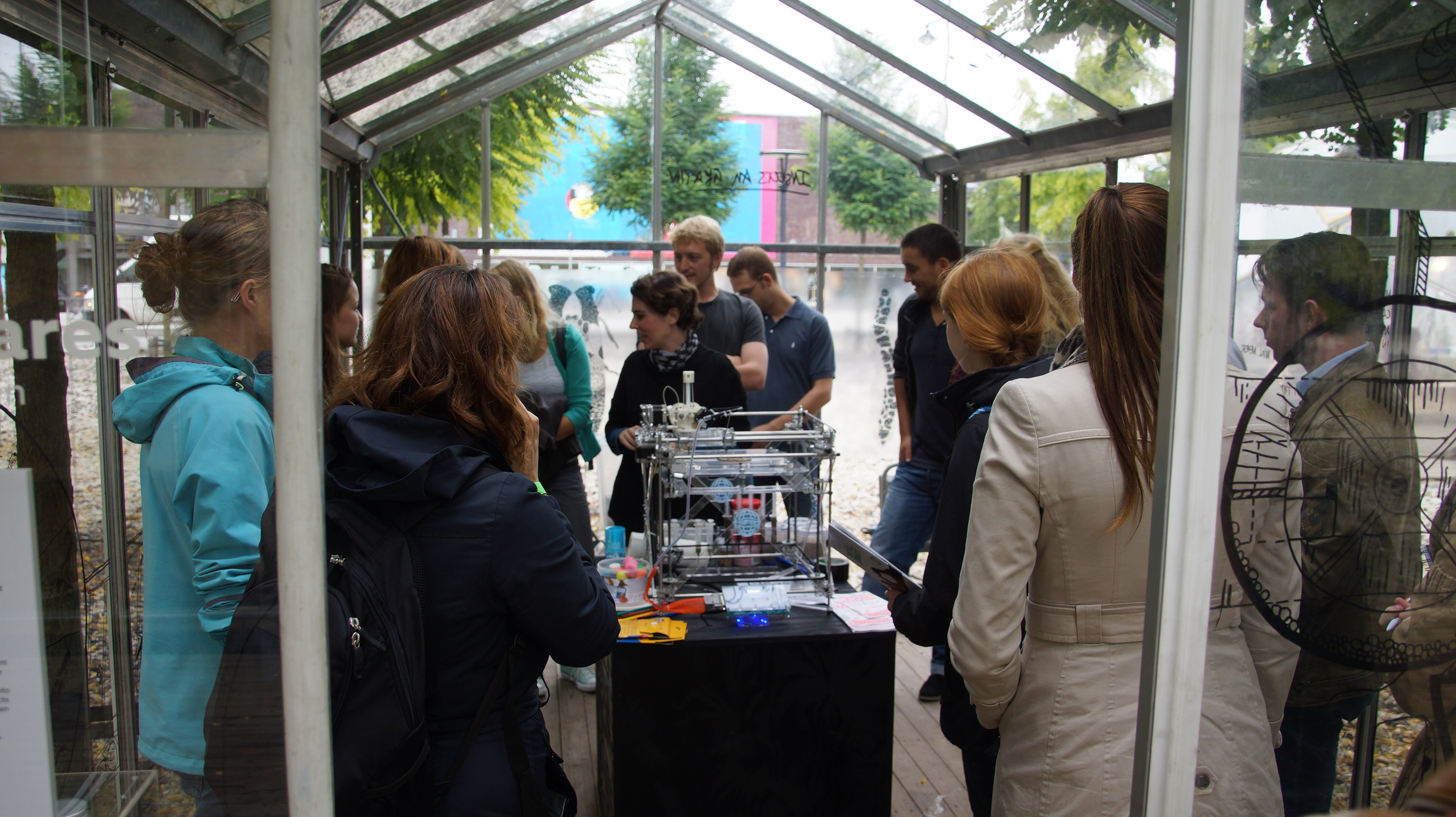
Insects au gratin by Susana Soares

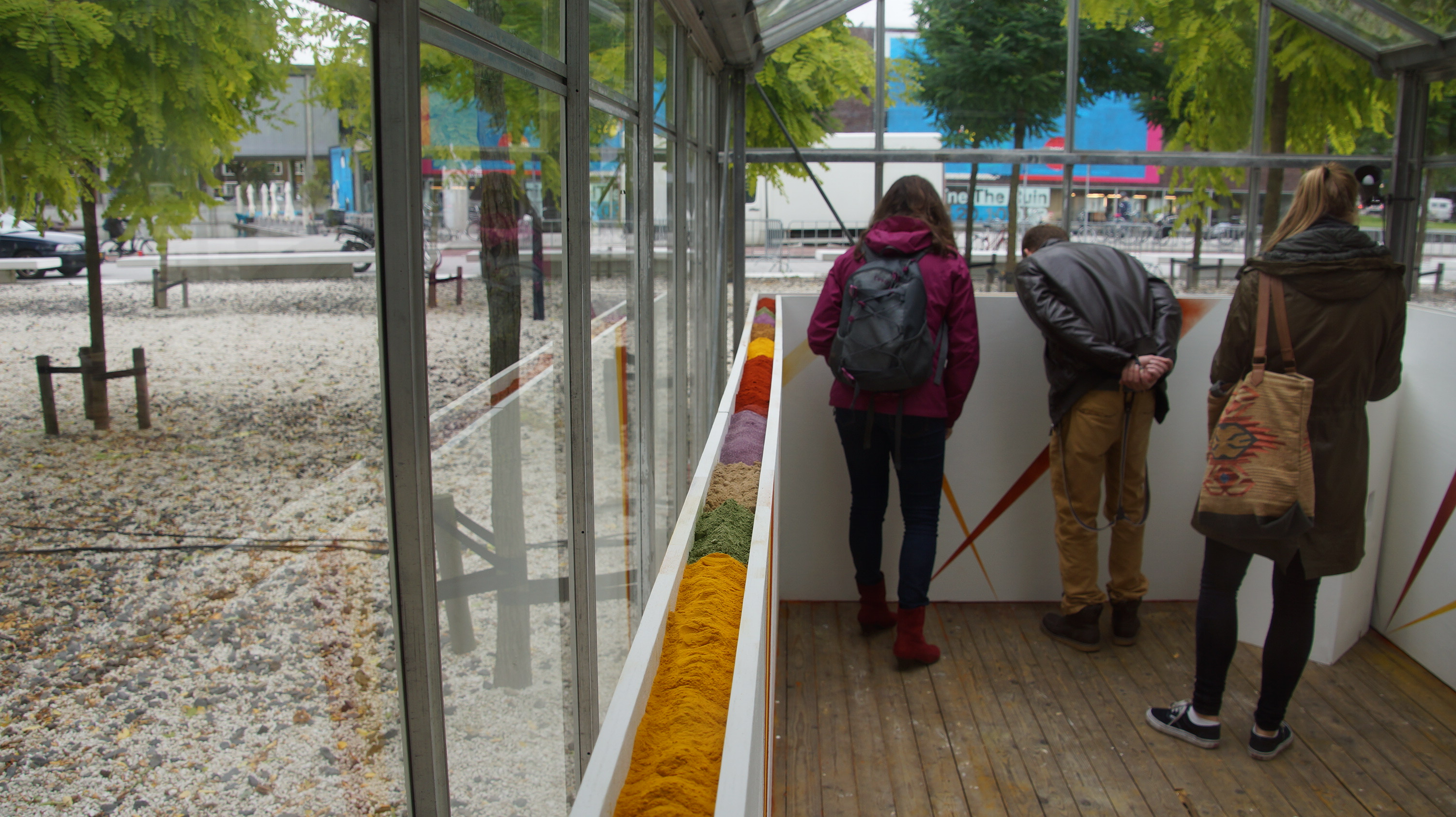
Dear Future by Sita Kuratomi Bhaumik

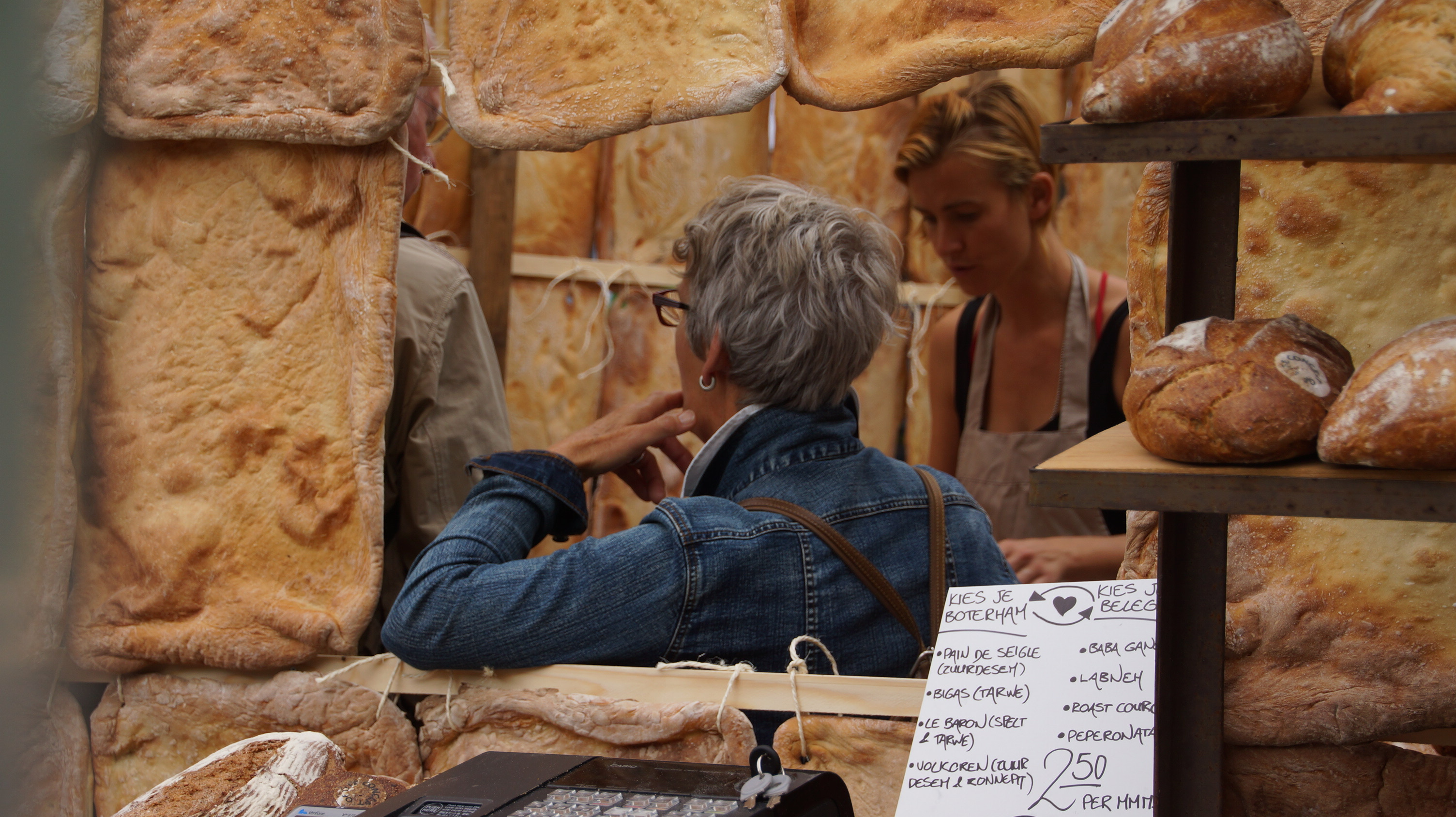
Concept of Life by Piet Hecker and Karel Goudsblom

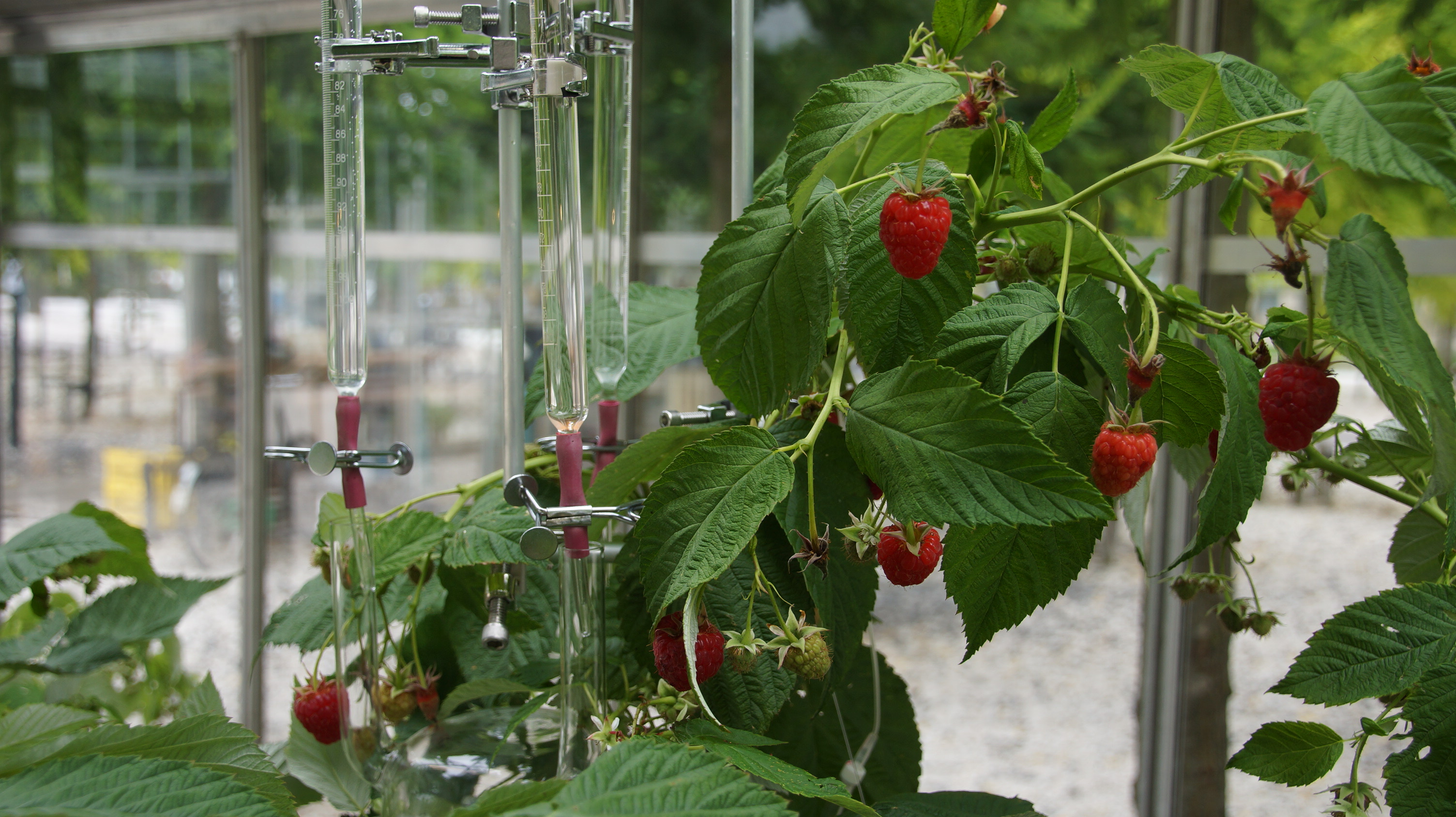
Rusty Knives by Revital Cohen and Tuur van Balen

The World Food Festival was held from 18 September to 27 October 2013 in Rotterdam. The festival took place from Rotterdam's Museumpark out over the city and harbor. It was held for more than five weeks with shows and talks by caterers, food producers, chefs and scientists.

The port town of Rotterdam hosted the Event. It included 170 cultures of tremendous culinary diversity. Gourmets, omnivores and professionals could see the latest developments at the World Food Festival, discuss, taste and experience. The festival brought visitors into contact with the entire food chain with large and small events, markets, tastings, workshops, interactive exhibitions, city walks and harbor excursions. The program focussed on culinary trends and the latest developments in the food industry, highlights world food issues, the impact of nutrition on health and local initiatives in the field of sustainable food. The versatile program of the World Food Festival went beyond the taste buds and provided also "food for thought." The World Food Festival offered an exciting glimpse into the future of food including "culinary jam sessions" between chefs.

== Exhibits (selection) ==
=== Insects au gratin by Susana Soares (UK) ===
Susana Soares from the United Kingdom explained and demonstrated that insects are a very effective source of protein and a realistic alternative to eating meat. However, many people object to the concept of eating insects. Therefore, Susana Soares used a three-dimensional printer to turn flour which was made from ground insects into all sorts of shapes. She forecast that in the future there will be a 3-D printer in many households near the blender and kettle.

=== Dear Future by Sita Kuratomi Bhaumik (US) ===
Sita Kuratomi Bhaumik from the United States visualized that "eating together establishes an emotional bond between people. This has always been the case and will always be so," according to the artist's statement. She created a wall of spices, such as paprika, green tea, purple yam, coriander, cumin, cloves, cardamon, cinnamon and turmeric, which triggers the collection of thoughts and stories of the visitors with various migration backgrounds.

=== Concept of Life by Piet Hecker and Karel Goudsblom (NL) ===
Piet Hecker and Karel Goudsblom from the Netherlands showed that small-scale activities could be the response to mass production without the need for large capital investment but by using high-quality ingredients. They installed a small bakery where visitors could experience the complete process from making dough to eating bread.

=== Rusty Knives by Revital Cohen and Tuur van Balen (UK) ===
Revital Cohen and Tuur van Balen from the United Kingdom combined design with biology, technology, science and curiosity. The observed that when an animal is slaughtered, it produces stress hormones. They added these hormones to raspberries using a bespoke feeding system, by which they could capture the "flavour of fear".
