= Alfred Grosser =

Writer, sociologist and political scientist (1925–2024)

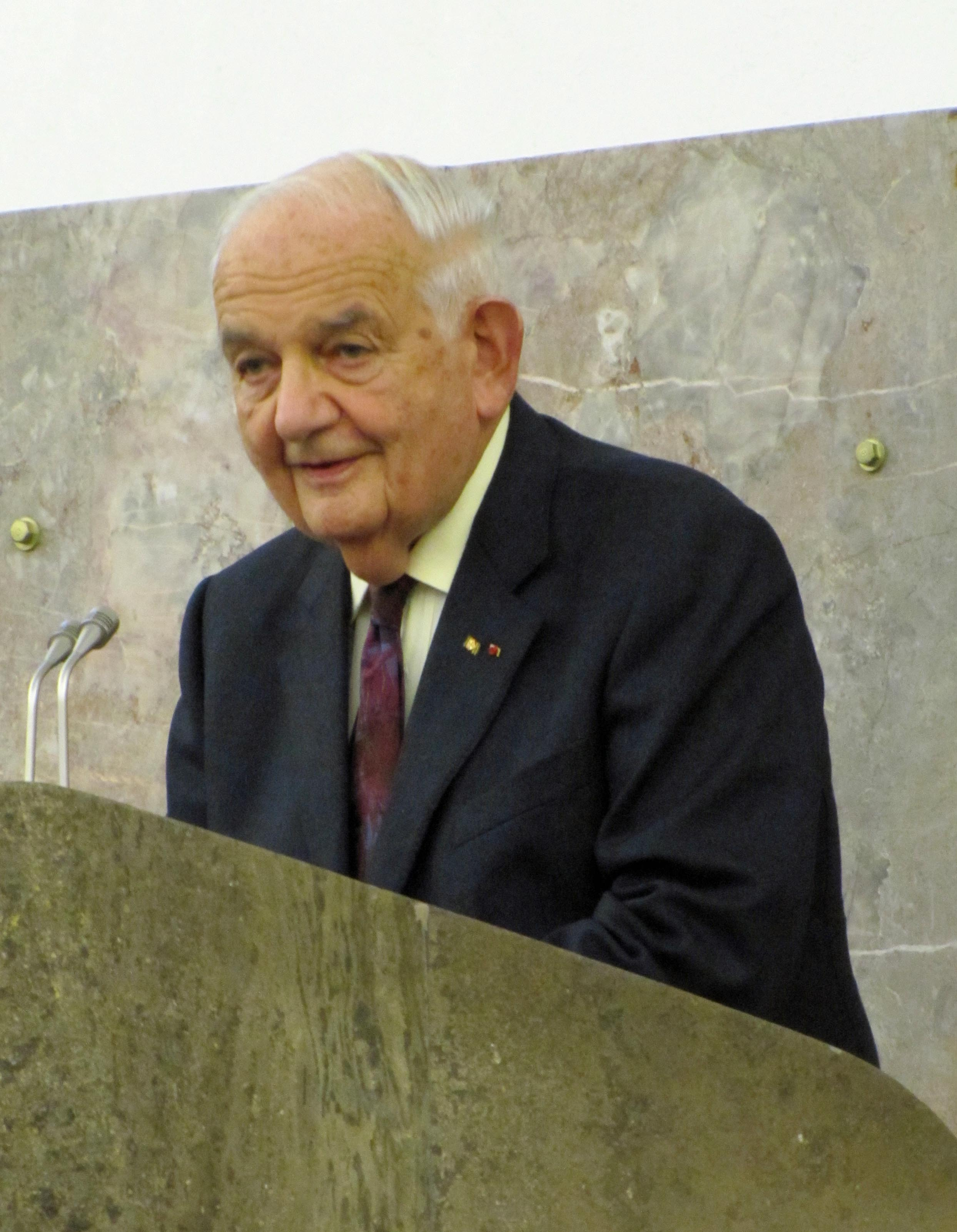
- Grosser in Frankfurt, 2010
- Born: 1 February 1925; Frankfurt, Prussia, Germany
- Died: 7 February 2024 (aged 99); Paris, France
- Occupations: Sociologist; Political scientist; Writer
- Organizations: Institut d'études politiques de Paris
- Awards: Friedenspreis des Deutschen Buchhandels; Order of Merit of the Federal Republic of Germany; Legion of Honour

Alfred Grosser (1 February 1925 – 7 February 2024) was a German-born French writer, sociologist and political scientist. Although his Jewish family had to move from Frankfurt to France in 1933, he focused on Franco-German cooperation after World War II, was instrumental in the Élysée Treaty in 1963, and writing books towards better understanding between the Germans and the French. He was professor at the Institut d'études politiques de Paris from 1955 to 1995, and contributed to newspapers and broadcasts including La Croix and Ouest-France. He was critical of Israeli politics which caused controversies. His work was honoured with notable awards.

== Life and career ==
=== Early life ===
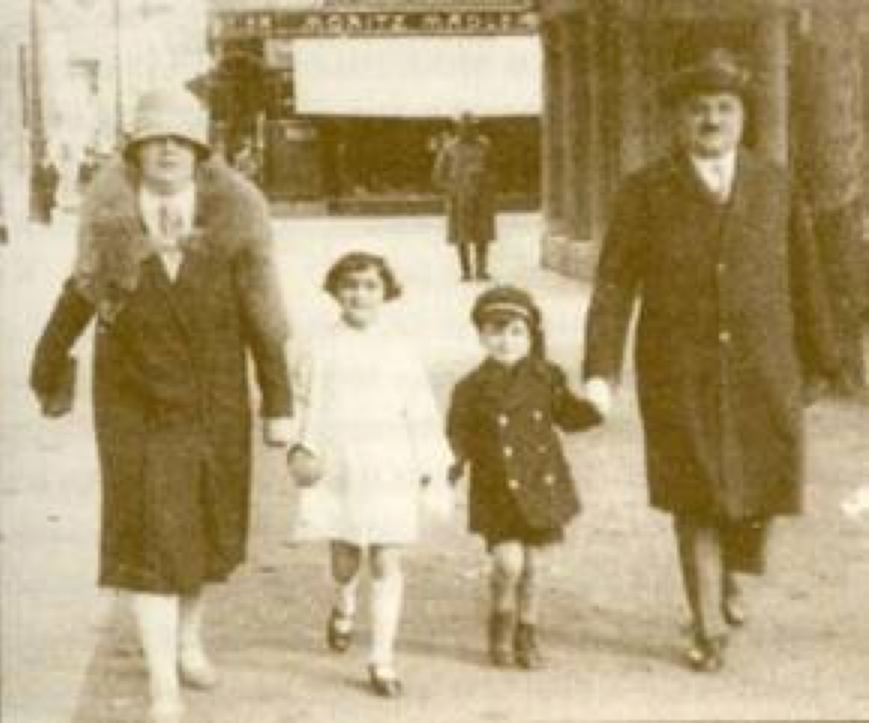
The Grosser family in Frankfurt in 1930

Grosser was born in Frankfurt on 1 February 1925. His father, Paul Grosser, was born in 1880 in Berlin and died in 1934 in Saint-Germain-en-Laye, France. A director of a children's hospital in Frankfurt, socialist, freemason, and Jew, he was forced to immigrate to France in 1933 due to the increasing antisemitism in Nazi Germany. He died only weeks after the family arrived in Paris. Alfred, his mother, Lily Grosser, and his sister were given French citizenship in 1937 through a decree by the Minister of Justice, Vincent Auriol, in 1937; as a result, they were spared possible internment in a French camp following France's declaration of war on Germany, in September 1939, when, under the government of Daladier, German refugees from Nazism were treated as enemy aliens like other German residents. During the war he joined the French Resistance. His sister Margarethe died after an accident with her bicycle in 1941, when she tried to escape German soldiers. In 1944 Grosser lived in Marseille and taught at a Catholic school; he learned then that part of his family in Germany had probably been deported to Auschwitz, but refused to think of a collective German guilt.

=== Studies and work ===
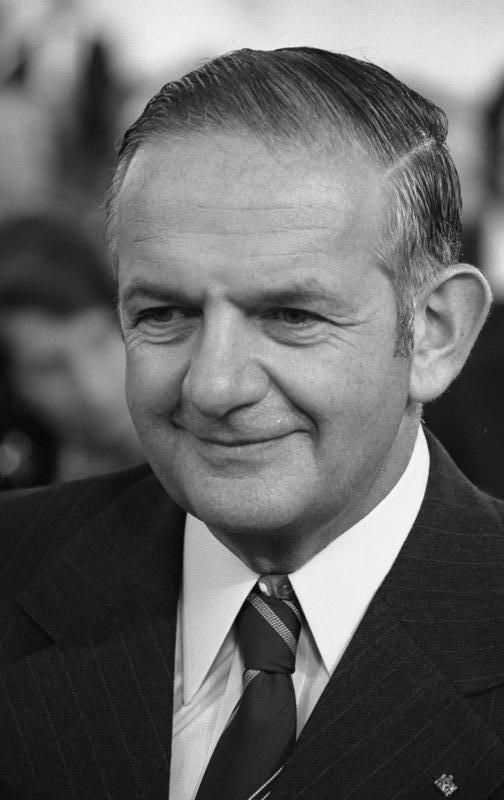
Grosser in 1975

After the war Grosser studied political science and the German language in Aix-en-Provence and Paris. After 1955, he became a professor at the Institut d'études politiques de Paris. In 1965, Grosser began contributing to many newspapers and broadcasts, including La Croix and Ouest-France. He was very involved in improving the Franco-German cooperation, and paved the road for the Élysée Treaty in 1963. He wrote around 30 books towards better understanding between the Germans and French. He received the Friedenspreis des Deutschen Buchhandels in 1975 for his role as "middle man between French and Germans, non-believers and believers, Europeans and people from other continents"; this gave him an early opportunity to speak at St. Paul's Church. In 1992, he retired as the director of studies and research at the Fondation Nationale des Sciences Politiques (Sciences Po).

He later turned to the Israeli–Palestinian conflict, arguing that exactly because his parents and four grandparents were Jewish he felt more strongly that Israel's settlement policy violated human rights. He wrote a book in 2009, Von Auschwitz nach Jerusalem (From Auschwitz to Jerusalem), questioning the policies and politics of Israel. He was invited to deliver the keynote for a yearly memorial event for the November pogroms of 1938 at St. Paul's Church in 2010, which caused controversy already when it was announced.

He gave a speech in the German parliament in 2014 in memory of the outbreak of the First World War. Grosser was a regular guest of the Frankfurt Book Fair. He delivered his speeches with only a few notes, responding with excellent repartee to his audience.

He received the honour of a Grand Officier of the Legion of Honour personally from President Macron in June 2019.

Grosser died in Paris on 7 February 2024, at age 99.

== Political opinions ==
Grosser was sceptical of symbolic meetings of French and German politicians, Adenauer and de Gaulle at the Reims Cathedral, Mitterrand and Kohl in Verdun, and Merkel and Sarkozy at the Arc de Triomphe, finding these places symbols of the First World War, while a better symbolic location after the Second World War, in his opinion, would have been Dachau concentration camp where French and Germans were held prisoners together. He was critical of French policies giving little chances to young people with migration background.

Grosser opposed many Israeli government policies, as well as parts of the French government. When asked to describe the way his statements were received, he referred to the "moral cudgel" (Moralkeule), a phrase coined by writer Martin Walser. In 1998, when one of Walser's speeches created huge controversy, Grosser publicly sided with Walser.

At this I am supporting Martin Walser's idea of the Auschwitz-club [as a stick]. Yes, I see that club, that is waved constantly against Germans when they say something against Israel. When they do so still, then the club says directly: "I hit you with Auschwitz". I find that unbearable. I have always fought anti-Semitism. And I will do it again! But equalizing criticizing Israel with anti-Semitism directly — that is dishonest and leads to mistakes.

— Alfred Grosser, 2007

Grosser was also of the opinion that Israel's politics inherently invoke anti-semitism. In 2003, Grosser left the board of magazine L'Express because he believed its reporting on the Middle East was unbalanced. He stated that the editor had reluctantly published his positive critique on a book that criticized Israel, while later printing multiple readers' letters attacking Grosser.

Grosser criticized awarding the 2007 Ludwig Börne Prize to Henryk M. Broder through Focus publisher Helmut Markwort, feeling that both were worthy neither of the prize nor of the presentation at St. Paul's Church.

Grosser was invited by the city of Frankfurt to give the main speech at a Kristallnacht commemorative meeting on 9 November 2010 at St. Paul's Church. Mayor Petra Roth was criticized for inviting him by members of the Central Council of Jews in Germany and others, but she stood by her invitation. They threatened to walk out should Grosser "fail regarding Israel". In the end, the speech was delivered without disturbance.

== Publications ==
Grosser's publications include:

- Deutschlandbilanz. Geschichte Deutschlands seit 1945, 1970 (Germany in Our Time- a Political History of the Postwar Years, 1974)
- Das Bündnis, 1981
- Versuchte Beeinflussung, 1981
- Der schmale Grat der Freiheit, 1981
- Western Alliance V815 (1982, from French)
- Das Deutschland im Westen, Carl Hanser Verlag, München 1985, ISBN 3-446-12619-8
- Frankreich und seine Außenpolitik, 1986
- Mit Deutschen streiten, 1987
- Mein Deutschland, 1993
- Deutschland in Europa, 1998
- Was ich denke., November 2000
- Wie anders sind die Deutschen?, 2002
- Wie anders ist Frankreich, 2005
- Die Früchte ihres Baumes. Ein atheistischer Blick auf die Christen, September 2005
- Der Begriff Rache ist mir völlig fremd in: Martin Doerry (editor): Nirgendwo und überall zu Haus. Gespräche mit Überlebenden des Holocaust (Deutsche Verlags-Anstalt), München 2006 ISBN 3-421-04207-1 (also on CD) pp. 120 – 129
- Die Frage nach der Leitkultur in: Robertson-von Trotha, Caroline Y. (ed.): Kultur und Gerechtigkeit (= Kulturwissenschaft interdisziplinär/Interdisciplinary Studies on Culture and Society, Vol. 2), Baden-Baden 2007, ISBN 978-3-8329-2604-5
- Von Auschwitz nach Jerusalem (Über Deutschland und Israel), Rowohlt-Verlag 2009, ISBN 978-3-498-02515-1
- Die Freude und der Tod, Rowohlt-Verlag

== Honours ==
A chair at the Sciences Po, where he had taught, was named after him. The Goethe University Frankfurt established a visiting professorship for civic society research in his name, focused on German-French relations.

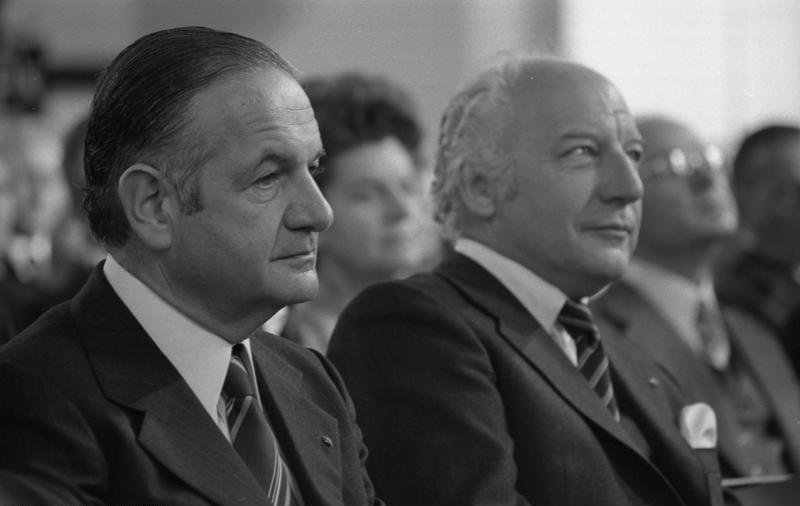
Grosser (l.) with President Walter Scheel, receiving the Friedenspreis

Grosser's awards include:

- 1975: Friedenspreis des Deutschen Buchhandels
- 1978: Theodor Heuss Medal
- 1995: Cicero Prize for Rhetoric
- 1996: Schiller Prize of the City of Mannheim
- 1997: Commandeur of the Ordre des Arts et des Lettres
- 1998: Grand Prix of the Académie des Sciences morales et politiques
- 2004: Abraham Geiger Prize of Abraham-Geiger-Kolleg of the University of Potsdam
- Goethe Plaque of Frankfurt
- Order of Merit of the Federal Republic of Germany
- 2019: Grand Officier of the Legion of Honour
- Grand-Croix of the Ordre National du Mérite

== Interviews ==
- Israels Politik fördert den Antisemitismus Martina Doering interviews Alfred Grosser, Berliner Zeitung, 15 August 2006. German
- Ich muss als Jude nicht für Israel sein Interview by Stefan Reinecke and Daniel Bax with Alfred Grosser in Die Tageszeitung, 4 April 2007. German
- Sofort heißt es: Antisemitismus! Tobias Kaufman interviews Alfred Grosser, following his new book "Von Auschwitz nach Jerusalem" (From Auschwitz to Jerusalem), 18 September 2009. German
- "Ich bin genetisch optimistisch": Talk about "Von Auschwitz nach Jerusalem" with Moritz Reininghaus, Die Tageszeitung 28 September 2009. German

== Reviews ==
- Of Deutschland in Europa, no author named
- Michael Hereth: "Alfred Grosser at his best", of Wie anders ist Frankreich
- Ursula Homann: "Hinwendung zur Welt Warum Alfred Grosser nicht an Gott glaubt", of Die Früchte ihres Baumes. Ein atheistischer Blick auf die Christen.
