= Fadumo Korn =

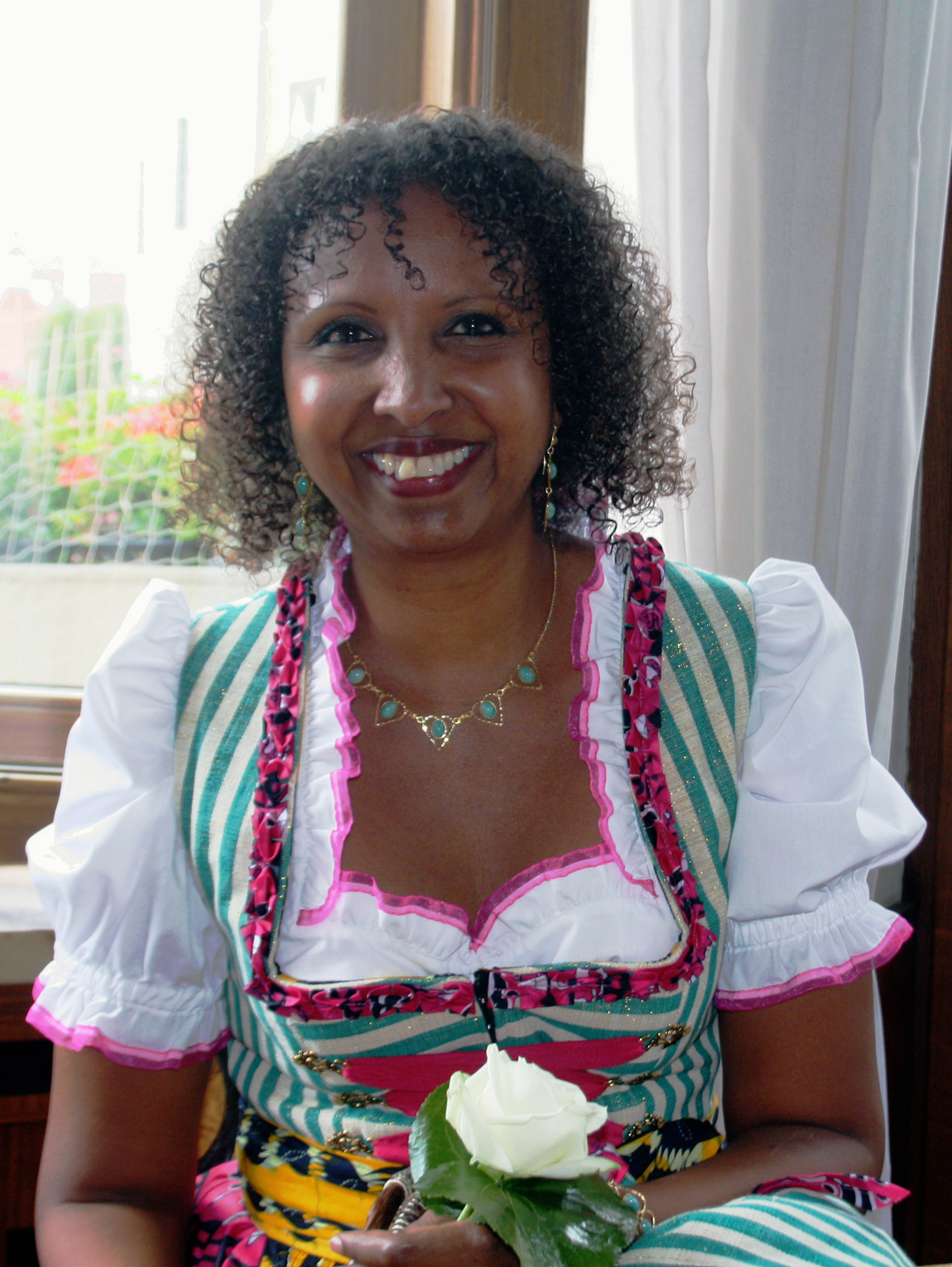
- Fadumo Korn in September 2011
- Born: 1964 (age 61–62); Somalia
- Other name: Faduma Korn

Fadumo Korn (born 1964) is a Somalia-born activist who has lived in Germany since 1979. She gained prominence through her 2004 autobiography, Geboren im großen Regen, and is known for her activism against female genital mutilation. In 2011, she received the Federal Cross of Merit of the Federal Republic of Germany. In 2020, she launched a petition to ensure that the topic of female genital mutilation is included in the training of key personnel such as doctors and social workers.

== Biography ==
Fadumo Korn was born in 1964 as a nomadic girl in rural Somalia. At the age of seven she underwent female genital mutilation, and suffered from medical complictaions, so was sent to live with a wealthy uncle in the capital, Mogadishu. There, she was exposed to an urban environment for the first time and was able to attend school. However, she developed rheumatism and since the doctors in Mogadishu were unable to treat her condition, Fadumo was sent by her uncle to Italy and eventually to Germany. She has lived in Munich in Bavaria since 1979. She and her German husband Walter Korn have a son together.

== Socio-political activities ==
Her autobiography, Geboren im großen Regen, was published in 2004, making her well known in German-speaking countries. In 2012, she founded the association NALA eV Education Instead of Circumcision, which campaigns against female genital mutilation. Fadumo Korn is a translator and author and works for an organization that advocates for better healthcare for migrant women. She leads a support group for circumcised girls and accompanies women who have undergone vulvar reconstruction surgery. On 25 June 2020, Fadumo Korn met with Family Minister Franziska Giffey, to present her with a related petition she had launched, which had been signed by more than 125,000 people. The petition calls for the training and education of doctors, lawyers, police officers, midwives, social workers, and educators in the issue.

In 2007, she was awarded the Münchner Lichtblicke grant. In April 2011, she received the Federal Cross of Merit. In July 2021, she was awarded the Bavarian Order of Merit of the Free State of Bavaria.

== Works ==
- Geboren im großen Regen. Mein Leben zwischen Afrika und Deutschland, 2004, ISBN 978-3-499-23798-0
- Schwester Löwenherz. Eine mutige Afrikanerin kämpft für Menschenrechte, 2009, ISBN 978-3-466-30850-7

== Honours ==
- 2007: Förderpreis Münchner Lichtblicke of the Foreigners' Advisory Council of the City of Munich
- 2011: Order of Merit of the Federal Republic of Germany
- 2021: Bayerischer Verfassungsorden
- 2025: Bavarian Order of Merit

== Radio broadcast ==
- Laura Koppenhöfer: Narben, die keiner sieht. In: SWR2 Kontext vom 9. Februar 2012. (Radio broadcast interview with Fadumo Korn)
