= Groser =

Groser is a surname of English origin, meaning "wholesale dealer grocer". Notable people with the surname include:

- John Groser (1890–1966), English priest and Christian socialist
- Tim Groser (born 1950), New Zealand politician and diplomat

== See also ==
- Grosser
