= Allochtoon =

Dutch statistical category of immigrants and their descendants

Allochtoon (plural: allochtonen) is a Dutch word (from Greek: ἀλλόχθων, from ἄλλος allos 'other' and χθών chthōn 'soil, earth, land'), literally meaning "emerging from another soil". It is the opposite of the word autochtoon (in English "autochthonous" or "autochthon"; from Greek αὐτόχθων, from αὐτός autos 'self, same' and again χθών chthōn 'soil, earth, land'), literally meaning "emerging from this soil".

In the Netherlands (and Flanders), the term allochtoon is widely used to refer to immigrants and their descendants. Officially the term allochtoon is much more specific and referred to anyone who had at least one parent born outside the Netherlands. The antonym autochtoon is less widely used, but it roughly corresponded to ethnic Dutch. Among a number of immigrant groups living in the Netherlands, a "Dutch" person (though they are themselves Dutch citizens) usually refers to the ethnic Dutch.

In 1950, Dutch descent, Dutch nationality, and Dutch citizenship were in practice identical. Dutch society consisted mostly of ethnic Dutch, with some colonial influences and sizeable minorities of Jewish, German and Flemish heritage. In 1950, most Dutch were either Catholic or Protestant, with some Jews and atheists. Decolonisation and immigration from the 1960s on altered the ethnic and religious composition of the country. That development has made the ethnicity and the national identity of the Dutch political issues.

Dutch nationality law is based primarily on the principle of jus sanguinis ("right of blood"). In other words, citizenship is conferred primarily by birth to a Dutch parent, irrespective of place of birth. A child born in the Netherlands to at least one parent residing in the Netherlands is also considered as Dutch.

== Definitions ==
The Dutch Centraal Bureau voor de Statistiek (CBS) used the definition that at least one of the parents is not born in the Netherlands.

A first distinction was made between first-generation and second-generation newcomers.

- A first-generation allochtoon was a person living in the Netherlands but born in a foreign country and who had at least one parent also born abroad. The 'country of origin' was the country in which that person was born.
- A second-generation allochtoon was a person born in the Netherlands with at least one parent born in a foreign country. When both parents were born abroad, the 'country of origin' was taken to be that of the mother. If one parent was born in the Netherlands, the 'country of origin' was the other parent's country of birth.

Note that someone who was born abroad, but with both parents born in the Netherlands, was an autochtoon.

A further distinction was made between "Western" and "non-Western" allochtoon people. A non-Western allochtoon was someone whose 'country of origin' was or lied in Turkey, Africa, Latin America and Asia, with the exception of Indonesia (or the former Dutch East Indies) and Japan.

This last distinction was made because the official definition of allochtoon deviated from the common use in popular speech, where people referred to someone as allochtoon only when that person was an immigrant or an asylum seeker who was clearly distinct in ethnicity (i.e. physical appearance or skin colour), clothing or behaviour from the traditional Dutch society. However, in the official sense, the largest group of allochtoon people were of German ancestry. The groups that people usually thought of when they heard the word allochtoon were those of Turkish, Moroccan, Surinamese and Dutch-Antillean ancestry. As of 2006, the first three groups comprise roughly 350,000 people each, together constituting just over 6% of the population. So a new term was introduced that lied closer to that meaning, "niet-westers allochtoon", which excluded allochtoon people from Europe, Japan (a developed high income country) and Indonesia (a former colony), but not those from the Netherlands Antilles and Suriname, even though the Netherlands Antilles are part of the Kingdom of the Netherlands and those from Suriname immigrated when that country was still part of the Kingdom of the Netherlands. This definition coincided better with the popular conception of the word as signifying people of low socio-economic status who are "different from us".

Although some viewed the usage of allochtoon as a stigma, several members of the Dutch royal family and all past monarchs were officially allochtoon people, as one of the parents was foreign-born. This includes 'western-allochtoon' King Willem Alexander as well as 'non-western allochtoon' Queen Máxima and their children.

As of November 1, 2016, the Statistics Netherlands stopped using the terms allochtoon and autochtoon. Instead, it distinguishes people with a migrant background and people with a Dutch background.

== Criticism ==
Originally proposed as a neutral term, the use of the term allochtoon has been criticized as being stigmatizing. There is a regular stream of newspaper articles reporting statistics that unfavourably distinguish allochtoon people from the rest of the Dutch, in terms of general health, involvement in crime, level of education or perceived loyalty to the host country.

In 2013, the city council of Amsterdam decided to stop using the term because of its divisive effect.

As of 2016, the term allochtoon is no longer used by the Dutch government, being replaced "persoon met migratieachtergrond" (person with immigrant background), an expression borrowed from German ("Mensch mit Migrationshintergrund").

== See also ==
- Demographics of the Netherlands
- Human migration

== Related concepts in other languages ==
- Gaikokujin (also "Gaijin") from Japanese.
- Farangi, Firang and Farang - various forms used to refer to Westerners/foreigners in the East
