= Lily Grosser =

German-born French activist

Lily Emilie Grosser
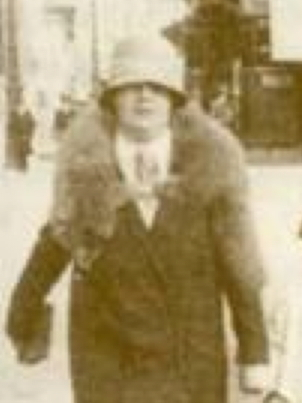
- Born: Lily Emilie Rosenthal; 2 June 1894; Frankfurt, Germany
- Died: 20 September 1968 (aged 74); Saint-Germain-en-Laye, France
- Citizenship: German, French
- Spouse: Paul Grosser (1880 to 1934)
- Children: Margaret (1922–1941), Alfred (1925–2024)
- Father: Alfred Rosenthal
- Awards: Cross of Merit for War Aid (from Germany), Cross of Merit on the ribbon of the Order of Merit of the Federal Republic of Germany

Signature
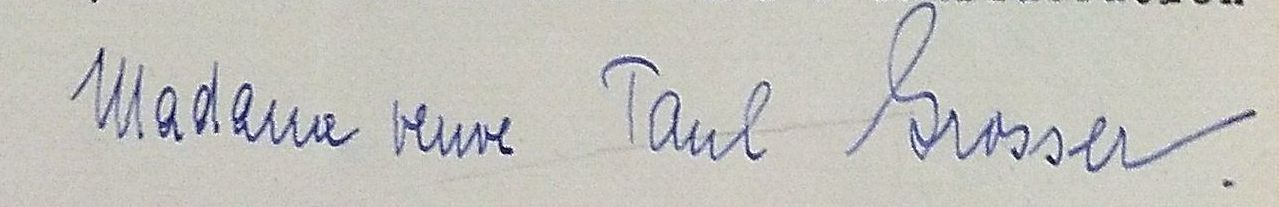

Lily Emilie Grosser (2 June 1894 – 20 September 1968) was a German-born French activist. A medal winner for her activism in Germany during World War I, Grosser and her family fled to France in 1933, where she was granted citizenship in 1937. After the war she became secretary of the French Committee for Exchange with the New Germany and was instrumental in building political and cultural Franco-German relations.

== Life ==
Lily Emilie Rosenthal, daughter of Alfred Rosenthal, was born into a Jewish middle-class household in Frankfurt. Until she was 18, she was allowed to leave the house on Mendelssohn Street in Frankfurt's Westend only in the company of a governess. Like many young women at the time, she supported the German soldiers during World War I from her homeland through active relief measures, and for this she received the German Cross of Merit for War Aid. The conflict was hard on her family; her fiancé Max Koch from Kronberg im Taunus died in 1918 and her father Alfred died in 1919.

On 16 March 1921 she married the Jewish university professor and pediatrician Paul Grosser in Frankfurt. (Paul had earned a post doctoral degree, called habilitation, in 1919 as the first pediatrician at Frankfurt University.) During World War I, he had served his country as a medical officer at the front. From 1921 to 1929, he served as chief physician of the Municipal Children's Home with children's clinic in Frankfurt's Jewish-influenced district of Westend. The Grosser's daughter Margaret was born 13 April 1922 and son Alfred followed on 1 February 1925.

In April 1933, as part of Nazi repressive measures against Jews, Paul Grosser was removed as department chair and, that summer, was dismissed although he was recognized as the "extremely successful medical director" of the Clementine Children's Hospital. The family then traveled to neighboring France to explore residency there and ultimately decided to move.

On 16 December 1933, the family emigrated from Frankfurt am Main to Saint-Germain-en-Laye northwest of Paris by rail via Switzerland. However Paul Grosser died of a heart attack on 7 February 1934 at the age of 54. With his death, Lily had to abandon Paul's plans to build a children’s sanatorium on the outskirts of the French capital. Instead, Lily established a children's home on the property Paul had purchased but without the planned medical facilities.

On 1 October 1937 Lily Grosser and her children were given French citizenship through a decree by the Minister of Justice (and later President), Vincent Auriol; as a result, they were spared possible internment in a French camp as enemy aliens.

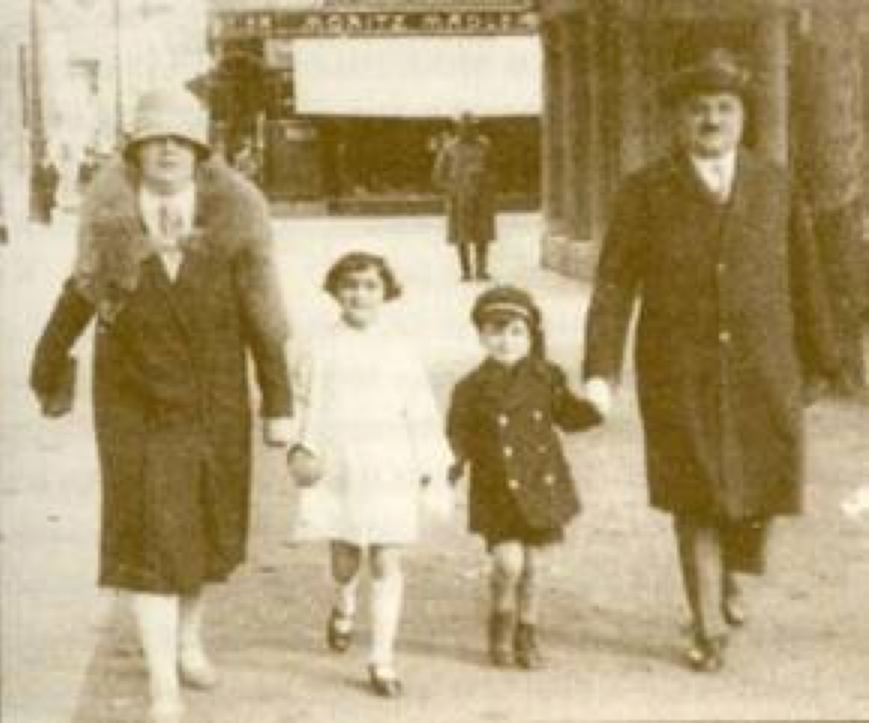
The Grosser family about 1929/1930 in Frankfurt, Germany.

Beginning in 1940, the family endured a series of escapes and separations.

- On 10 June 1940, after the German troops invaded Paris, Lily Grosser's children Margarethe and Alfred fled alone to the unoccupied part of France. Her son Alfred recalled that the two siblings bicycled their way to freedom. Lily remained with her mother who died after a long illness on 29 July 1940 at the age of 81.
- In September 1940, Lily Grosser followed her children to Saint-Raphaël in southwestern France, but in 1941 daughter Margarethe died from a blood infection that resulted from an injury during the bicycle escape.
- In 1943, when German soldiers arrived to replace the occupying Italian Axis forces, Lily Grosser and son Alfred fled again but became separated from each other.
- In the autumn of 1944, Lily and her son Alfred met again in Marseilles, France. There she became deputy head of a military hospital run by the French Red Cross.

After the end of World War II, from 1948 to 1967, despite and because of these experiences, Lily Grosser and her son joined the Comité français d'échanges avec l 'Allemagne nouvelle (French Committee for Exchange with the New Germany) and worked to establish a lively exchange and reconciliation between the French and Germans, ultimately hoping to strengthen democratic structures in Germany. She was remembered as "the soul of the committee." In 1962 she received the Cross of Merit on the Ribbon of the Order of Merit from Germany for her tireless dedication toward improved relations between the two countries.

Lily Grosser died 20 September 1968 in Paris after a serious illness.

== Honors ==
- As a young woman, on 24 August 1918, Lily Emilie Rosenthal received the German Cross of Merit for War Aid, which was awarded to all men and women who had excelled in domestic service during World War I.
- On 23 January 1962, Lily Grosser was awarded the Cross of Merit on the Ribbon of the Order of Merit of the Federal Republic of Germany for special achievements in the political, economic, cultural, spiritual or voluntary fields after the end of World War II.
