= Tim Grosser =

Australian cricketer (born 1942)

Personal information
- Full name: John William Grosser
- Born: 29 August 1942 (age 84); Gunnedah, Australia
- Source: Cricinfo, 30 December 2016

John William "Tim" Grosser (born 29 August 1942) is an Australian former cricketer. He played two first-class matches for New South Wales in 1968/69.

== See also ==
- List of New South Wales representative cricketers
