= Migration background =

German-language identity and ancestry term

Age structure by migration background in Germany in 2021

In the Germanosphere, migration background (German: Migrationshintergrund) is a term used to describe people on the basis of identity and ancestry. Migration background is a variably defined socio-demographic characteristic that describes persons who or their close ancestors come from another country.

The term was first used in 1998 by sociologist Ursula Boos-Nünning in the 10th Children and Youth Report. It is used as a concept primarily in German-speaking countries. The definitions are usually linked to nationality or place of birth. In Germany (or according to the Federal Statistical Office), people who were not born with German citizenship themselves or whose father or mother were not born with German citizenship are considered to have a migration background. In Austria, it refers to people whose parents were both born abroad; depending on their place of birth, a distinction is also made between first and second generation migrants. In Switzerland the Federal Statistical Office defines the term relatively independently of nationality.

In 2007, the German Federal Statistical Office started publishing data regarding "the population with a migration background". In 2019, according to the official definition, 21.2 million people with a migration background lived in Germany, which corresponds to a population share of around 26%.

== Germany ==
=== Conceptual history ===
Proportion of residents with a migration background in 2019

The term Migrationshintergrund is a neologism that was first used by the Essen education professor Ursula Boos-Nünning in the 1990s. The term is derived from the English term "migration background" and was translated by Boos-Nünning. The term was brought about as a reaction to changing demographics: with naturalized people, late repatriates (with German citizenship) and children of foreigners born in Germany who, under certain conditions, had German citizenship following a legal reform, more than 7 million people lived in Germany at the beginning of the 21st century and their migration experiences should be taken into account. The previously used criterion of citizenship or statelessness was too short to describe the social integration processes of naturalized immigrants of the first generation and their descendants, so the new criterion was also used.

When defining the term for the 2005 microcensus, the Federal Statistical Office of Germany claimed that the term had been "common in science and politics for a long time". It was being used "increasingly frequently, despite its awkwardness". It expressed "that those affected should not only include the immigrants themselves – i.e. the actual migrants – but also certain of their descendants born in Germany". The office admitted, however, that it was difficult to use the term "people with a migration background" in a clear-cut manner. For example, the term appeared in 1998 in the tenth report on children and young people by the German Youth Institute, and in the PISA study of 2003. In 2005, the term was officially included as an ordering criterion in the official statistics of the microcensus, which, according to migration researcher Klaus Jürgen Bade, had been "demanded by experts for years".

=== Definition ===
==== Definition of the Federal Statistical Office 2005 ====
Since the 2005 microcensus, the state statistical offices and the Federal Statistical Office have distinguished between the population with a migration background and the population without a migration background. This distinction is made by indirectly determining data on migration background. The basis for this is an amendment to the Microcensus Act of 2004, which provides for the inclusion of questions to determine migration background in the surveys from 2005 to 2012. Specifically, information is requested on immigration, nationality and immigration of the respective respondent and their parents. People with a migration background (in the broader sense) are defined as "all those who immigrated to the current territory of the Federal Republic of Germany after 1949, as well as all foreigners born in Germany and all those born in Germany as Germans with at least one parent who immigrated after 1949 or was born in Germany as a foreigner". The definition of people with a migration background in the narrower sense, which is also used for the purpose of comparability over time, is the same, except that this definition does not include German immigrant children who are born and no longer live with their parents or one parent.

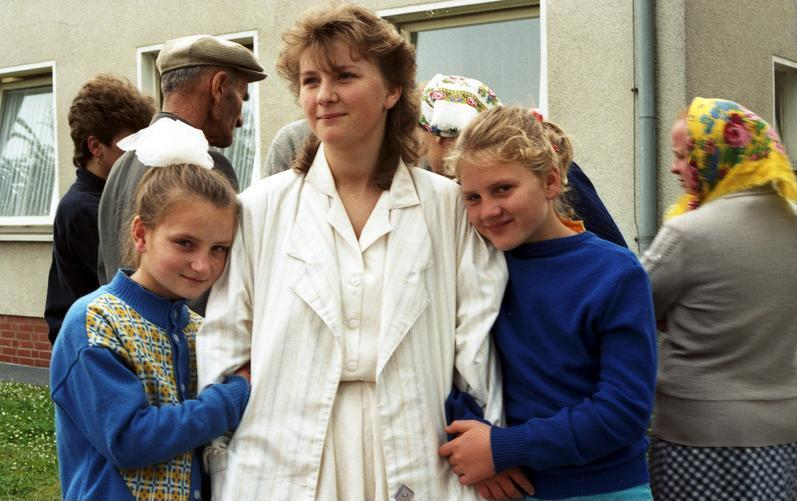
This family from Kazakhstan moved to Germany in the late 1980s. They are considered Aussiedler, meaning they are immigrants of German ancestry. Many "re-settlers" moved to Germany from the Eastern Bloc in the period.

By definition, late repatriates and their children are also considered to be people with a migration background. These people don't necessarily need to have any migration experience of their own. In Germany, migration experience of one parent is sufficient to be classified as a person with a migration background, while in Austria, for example, migration experience of both parents is required. An estimated 2.45 million people (27.2% of the total population) with a migration background lived in Austria in 2023.

One-third of people with a migration background have lived in Germany since birth. In 2023, roughly 58.97 million Germans did not have a migration background.

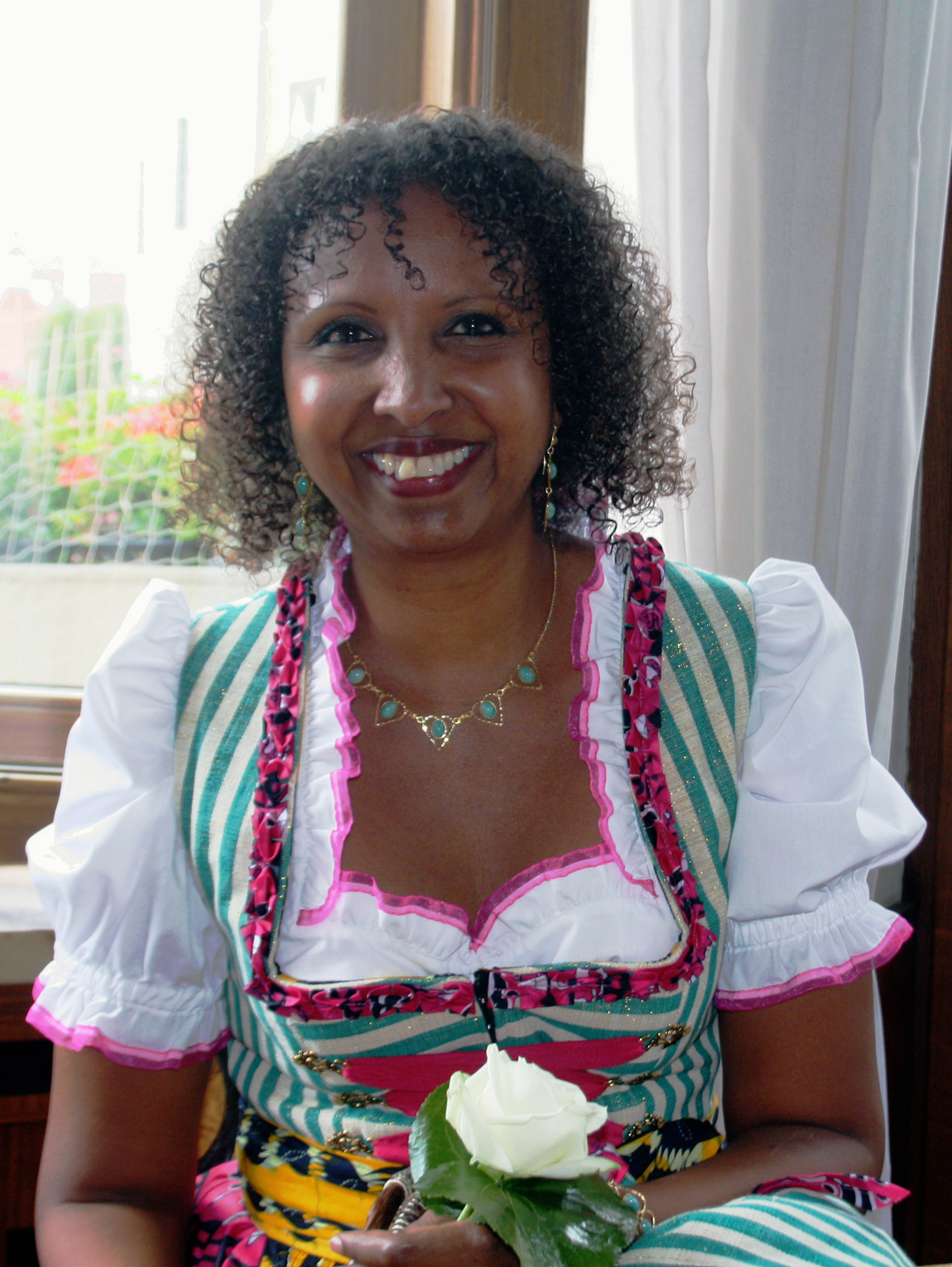
Somali-born women's rights activist Fadumo Korn has lived in Germany since 1979. She is a German citizen of "migration background".

According to this definition, in 2006, 15.3 million people with a migration background lived in Germany, corresponding to 18.6% of the population. In 2009, the number of people with a migration background in Germany rose to 16 million, or 19.6% of the population. This growth is due to the increase in the number of German citizens with a migration background, as the number of foreigners in Germany has stagnated at 7.2 million for around ten years.

At 10.4 million, those who have immigrated since 1950 – the population with their own personal experience of migration – make up two thirds of all people with a migration background. In 2006, 7.3 million or 8.9% of the population or 47% of people with a migration background had foreign nationality. People with a migration background and German citizenship comprised 7.9 million or 9.5% of the population or 53% of people with a migration background in 2006. People with a migration background are on average significantly younger than those without a migration background (33.8 compared to 44.6 years). They are more strongly represented in the younger age cohorts than in the older ones. Among children under five, people with a migration background made up a third of this population group in 2008.

The 2011 European Union census was based on a slightly different definition of migration background. The question was not about immigration after 1949, but after 1955.

===== Change in 2016 =====
In 2016, the Federal Statistical Office of Germany changed the definition as part of a "typification of migration background" so that it is now "easier to understand". It now reads: "A person has a migration background if they themselves or at least one parent was not born with German citizenship. In detail, this definition includes immigrant and non-immigrant foreigners, immigrant and non-immigrant naturalised citizens, (late) repatriates and the descendants of these groups who were born as Germans."

To explain why the old definition was inadequate, the Federal Statistical Office explains: "There is also a small group of people who were born abroad with German citizenship and whose parents do not have a migration background. In the 2015 microcensus, this affects an estimated 25,000 people. These people were born while their parents were abroad, e.g. while studying abroad or working abroad. But these people born abroad do not have a migration background because they themselves and their parents were born with German citizenship. Children of parents without a migration background cannot have a migration background".

According to the new definition, the migration background no longer depends on the time of a person's immigration to the territory of Germany. Nevertheless, the Federal Statistical Office restricts this: "The displaced persons of the Second World War and their descendants do not belong to the population with a migration background, since they and their parents were born with German citizenship". The fact that people such as Sudeten Germans or Status Germans were usually actually born without German citizenship is apparently not taken into account in this definition.

The new definition is first found in a statement issued in September 2016 entitled "Population with a migration background at record levels", while the old definition is still used in the 2016 Statistical Yearbook.

==== Further definitions ====
- Ethnic minorities in Poland

According to Article 3 of the Basic Law and the General Equal Treatment Act (AGG), it is forbidden to attach legal consequences to a person's "ethnic origin". No one may be discriminated against or given preferential treatment because they or their ancestors immigrated to Germany.

Two years after the entry into force of the Integration and Participation Act in Berlin, which provides for the recording of the proportion of people with a migration background in various social groups, the Berlin Senate announced in 2012 in response to a parliamentary question that correct measurements in the public service or among politicians would require surveys that are not legally permissible. Therefore, the state of Berlin finally revised the legislation and on 17 June 2021 the House of Representatives passed the Act on the New Regulation of Participation in the State of Berlin, which came into force on 16 July 2021. Article 1 of the Act contains the Act to Promote Participation in the Migration Society of the State of Berlin (Participation Act – PartMigG), which replaces the previous Integration and Participation Act and specifies how the migration background should be recorded. Paragraph 3, paragraph 2 PartMiG states: "A person has a migration background if they themselves or at least one of their parents does not have German citizenship by birth." Paragraph 8, in turn, regulates how this migration background is to be recorded: "The public bodies pursuant to paragraph 4, paragraph 1 shall, after obtaining written consent from applicants and employees, determine whether they are persons with a migration background. The data is collected for the purpose of implementing measures pursuant to this section and for statistical purposes. Discrimination based on information or lack of information on migration background is prohibited. Consent can be revoked at any time without giving reasons to the body collecting the consent. In the event of revocation, the data must be deleted immediately and confirmation of the revocation must be sent to the person revoking the consent." On this basis, according to paragraph 9, paragraph 1, for "each salary, remuneration and pay group as well as each superior and management level ... it must be determined whether persons with a migration background are employed in proportion to their share of the Berlin population. The number of trainees and civil servant candidates, broken down by whether they have a migration background or not, by career or professional field and by training occupation, must be presented".

At the same time, due to criticism of the concept of migration background, the new Section 3 Paragraph 1 of the PartMiG introduced the new category of "person with a migration history", which covers a much wider group of people. In addition to people with a migration background, this category also includes "people who are racially discriminated against and people who are generally attributed a migration background. This attribution can be linked in particular to phenotypic characteristics, language, name, origin, nationality and religion". Legal consequences are linked to this definition, as Section 19 Paragraph 2 stipulates for the District Advisory Council for Participation and Integration to be formed in each Berlin district: "The District Advisory Council consists of representatives of people with a migration history as well as representatives who can contribute to the work of the District Advisory Council due to their knowledge of issues of participation, integration and equal participation of people with a migration history. The representatives of people with a migration history should form the majority".

=== New definition of "immigration history" ===
In March 2023, results of the microcensus on the population "with an immigration history" were published. According to this concept, (German: Einwanderungsgeschichte), a person has an "immigration history" if they themselves immigrated or both parents immigrated to what is now Germany after 1950.

When publishing the results of the 2022 census at the end of June 2024, the Federal Statistical Office announced that the "concept of immigration history [...] replaces the concept of migration background from the 2011 census". The new concept now appears in the forms "with immigration history", "immigrants", "descendants of immigrants", "with one-sided immigration history" and "without immigration history". A newly created definition of immigration history was announced: "An immigration history is said to be someone who has either immigrated to Germany themselves or whose two parents have immigrated to Germany. The state of a person at the time of their birth applies. People born before 2 August 1945 are evaluated based on the borders of the German Reich as of 31 December 1937. People born after 2 August 1945 are classified based on the borders of today's Federal Republic. Information on the descendants of migrants, regardless of whether they have a bilateral or unilateral immigration history, can only be provided for persons of the same age and under 18 years of age who are registered in the same municipality as their parents". This means that all German persons who were born sometime before 1945 in the areas annexed from 1938 onwards now have an immigration history, as do those who were born after 2 August 1945, but before the expulsion in the areas east of the Oder-Neisse line.

==== Different definitions of individual federal states ====
The federal states use their own definitions for their purposes. According to the definition used in North Rhine-Westphalia up to and including 2010, a person has a migration background if he or she has a foreign nationality or immigrated to the territory of the present Federal Republic of Germany after 1949 or has at least one immigrant or foreign parent; in the definition used since 2011, the nationality of the parents no longer plays a role.

On 7 July 2016 the Bundestag approved the draft of the Federal Government and the coalition factions CDU/CSU and SPD for a Federal Integration Act in response to the European refugee crisis. The 2016 draft bill for a Bavarian Integration Act was intended to give Germans with a migration background equal status to persons with a parent or grandparent who immigrated to Germany after the end of the migration movements related to the Second World War. Unless otherwise stated this article is based on the definition of the Federal Statistical Office.

==== Use of the term ====
The term "person with a migration background" is not synonymous with the terms "Ausländer", "immigrant" or "migrant", but is often incorrectly used as follows:

- Naturalization does not change the status "with a migration background".
- There are foreigners who migrated to Germany before 1950 and have not yet been naturalized. According to the original definition of the statistics, neither they nor their descendants are "people with a migration background," but according to the later definition of the Migration Background Survey Ordinance of 2010, they are.
- People who have immigrated to Germany as Germans (especially late repatriates, but also children of German parents who happened to be born abroad) are also "people with a migration background" according to the definition of 2005 or 2011.
- People who were born as Germans in Germany and have German parents can also have a migration background. And conversely, people with a migration background (according to the 2016 definition) are not necessarily migrants themselves.
- Germans with one foreign parent who never immigrated to Germany have a migration background according to the 2016 definition, but would not have a migration background according to the 2005 or 2011 definition.
- A child born in Germany to foreign parents on or after 1 January 2000 is German under certain conditions. New regulations came into force in 2014.

In the course of the debate on integration policy, the integration of foreigners, immigrants and people with a migration background is often referred to as "integration of people with a migration background" in the current political debate in Germany. This topic was an important issue in the 2025 German federal election.

The term "migration background" has become widespread in the media and in everyday language, although its use is not always correct. For example, the term "people with a migration background" often replaces the previously common term "foreign citizens". Inaccurately, the term "person with a migration background" is often replaced by the shorter word "migrant". If this is used again elsewhere with a different meaning, for example in a numerical comparison of social groups, confusion can arise.

The term "people with a migration background" was also caught up in the mechanism known as the "euphemism treadmill". Many of them now have the same connotations as the term "foreigner". In some selection processes, "migration background" was suggested as the "un-word of the year".

The daily newspaper Die Tageszeitung called on its readers to suggest a new term at the end of 2010. The most frequently suggested terms were "human being", "foreigner", "new German", "immigrant", "new citizen" and "immigrant" – but none of the suggestions convinced the editors: "So the conclusion remains that many people would like a different word, but unfortunately there is no really catchy one at hand".

Meanwhile, the term is also used jokingly in the media in non-political contexts ("German words and their migration background", "Nausea with a migration background", and "Royal dish with a migration background").

==== Synonyms and antonyms ====
The term immigration history (German: Migrationshintergrund) is increasingly used as a synonym for migration background, for example "people with an immigration history", which was coined by the former North Rhine-Westphalian Integration Minister Armin Laschet. He is considered one of the first conservative politicians to advocate a non-ideological commitment to immigration.

When referring to population groups, the Dutch words allochthon and autochthonous mean the same as "with a migration background" or "without a migration background". In relation to Germany, the controversial term "Bio-German" is also used for people without a migration background.

The term "German of German descent" is not the opposite of the term " people with a migration background", as the latter also includes immigrants of German descent with German citizenship (e.g. late repatriates) and their descendants, who thus fall under both terms. Children from binational families can also be "German of German descent" and "with a migration background" at the same time due to their international roots.

The term "passport German" is also used for naturalized persons with a migration background. Initially, the term "passport German" was used primarily to describe late repatriates who were considered to be of German nationality under the law of their country of origin and who had a privileged legal position compared to other migrants when acquiring German citizenship. Although they were often perceived as foreign immigrants, they were not legally considered foreigners. The term was later co-opted, especially in circles of the New Right, as a derogatory term for Germans with a migration background. A passdeutsch, "passport German", identity is often contrasted with the concept of ethnic Germans.

==== Criticism of the category of migration background ====
The use of the term in the definition has also been criticized. At a conference held by the Berlin Institute for Empirical Integration and Migration Research at the end of 2015 on the use, impact and evaluation of empirical data in the context of immigration society, the participating experts agreed that the migration background neither "makes it comprehensively clear who has migration ties in Germany" nor "provides useful data on membership of a minority". In this context, the social anthropologist Anne-Kathrin Will explained that the use of the term could promote an "ethnically connotated" understanding of being German, according to which "only those who are of German descent are German – despite the reform of citizenship law". The sociologist Kenneth Horvath also criticized the fact that the migration background serves as a category of difference to define the "other" and is in the ethnicizing tradition of terms such as foreigner. Furthermore, the concept does not statistically cover all those who are "meant" by it, but on the other hand it counts people who are not actually the subject of the discourse on migration backgrounds. The term is also rejected by many of those referred to by it because of its "essentializing and stigmatizing potential". In its 2021 report, the independent expert commission on integration capacity appointed by the federal government recommended abandoning the statistical category of migration background because it now covers a very large and heterogeneous group, mixes nationality and migration experience at an analytical level, is unnecessarily complex and obscures rather than explains the causes of inequalities. For people who do not identify with the label, there is no way to "escape" it. Instead, the commission recommends speaking of "immigrants and their (direct) descendants" when referring to immigrants and children of two immigrants.

In his speech on the 60th anniversary of the German-Turkish recruitment agreement, Federal President Frank-Walter Steinmeier said it was time for a change of perspective, and explained: "If today more than a quarter of the people have a so-called migrant background, most of them born here, why do we still point at other people and say, 'these are people with a migrant background', as if they were somehow different, extraordinary, more foreign than 'us'? Who is this 'us'? No, ladies and gentlemen, you are not 'people with a migrant background' – we are a country with a migrant background!"

Sociologist Aladin El-Mafaalani believes that the term "migration background" covers too many things. It suggests that the group described in this way is somehow homogeneous. In reality, however, it is much more heterogeneous than the group without a migration background. Some are themselves immigrants, others belong to the second or even third generation, some only speak German, others primarily speak their native language. Country of origin, ethnic origin, religion and educational background are very different. This group cannot be tarred with the same brush. In a sense, it is "superdiverse".

=== Statistics ===
==== Statistics in 2007 ====
According to the 2007 microcensus, the population with migration background totalled 15.4 million people.

==== Statistics in 2011 ====
According to the 2011 census 18.9% of the population in Germany had a migration background. The migrant population is concentrated in the metropolitan areas of southern and western Germany from Munich to the Ruhr area. In 2011, 42.7 percent of the population in Frankfurt am Main, 38.6 percent in Stuttgart and 36.2 percent in Nuremberg had a migration background. In Offenbach am Main, the number of people with migrant background and was around 50%.

==== Statistics in 2015 ====
In 2015, 21% of the population in Germany, or 17.1 million people, had a migration background, which represents an increase of 4.4% over the previous year. The majority of people who came to Germany in 2015 are not yet recorded here.

==== Statistics in 2019 ====
In 2019, 26% of the population in Germany, or 21.2 million people, had a migration background, an increase of 2.1% over the previous year.

In 2019, around 52% of the population with a migration background (11.1 million people) were German citizens and almost 48% were foreigners (10.1 million people). The vast majority of the foreign population with a migration background immigrated themselves (85%), while 46% of Germans with a migration background immigrated themselves.

Of the Germans with a migration background, 51% have had German citizenship since birth. They have a migration background because at least one parent is foreign, naturalized, or a (late) re-settler. A further 25% are naturalized, 23% came to Germany themselves as (late) re-settlers, and around 1% have German citizenship through adoption.

Share of the total population of people with a migration background in Germany
| Migration status | Number in 1000 | in % |
| population in private households total | 81,848 | 100,0 |
|---|---|---|
| without a migration background | 60,603 | 74.0 |
| with a migration background | 21,246 | 26.0 |
| of them Germans with a migration background | 11,125 | 13.6 |
| of these, Germans with a migration background | 5,125 | 6.3 |
| of whom Germans born in Germany with a migration background | 6,000 | 7.3 |
| of them foreigners | 10,121 | 12.4 |
| of which immigrated foreigners | 8,556 | 10.5 |
| of whom were foreigners born in Germany | 1,564 | 1.9 |

==== Statistics in 2022 ====
According to an evaluation based on the 2022 microcensus, the proportion of people with an immigration history among all employed persons was 25 percent.

=== Composition of population groups with a migration background ===
==== By religious affiliation ====
According to the results of the 2011 German census, 29.0% of the population with a migration background are Roman Catholic, 15.9% are members of a Protestant regional church, 6.5% are Eastern Orthodox, and 0.5% belong to Jewish communities. Muslims are provisionally included in the category "not belonging to any public religious community", which makes up a total of 36.1% of the population with a migration background.

==== By status and generation ====
According to the Federal Statistical Office, the number of people with a migration background in 2005 was as follows:

- immigrant foreigners (1st generation): about 36 percent
- foreigners born in Germany (2nd and 3rd generation): about 11%
- Late repatriates: about 12%
- naturalized immigrants: about 20%
- Persons with at least one immigrant parent or parent with foreign citizenship: approximately 21%

==== According to the geopolitical origin of the immigrants ====
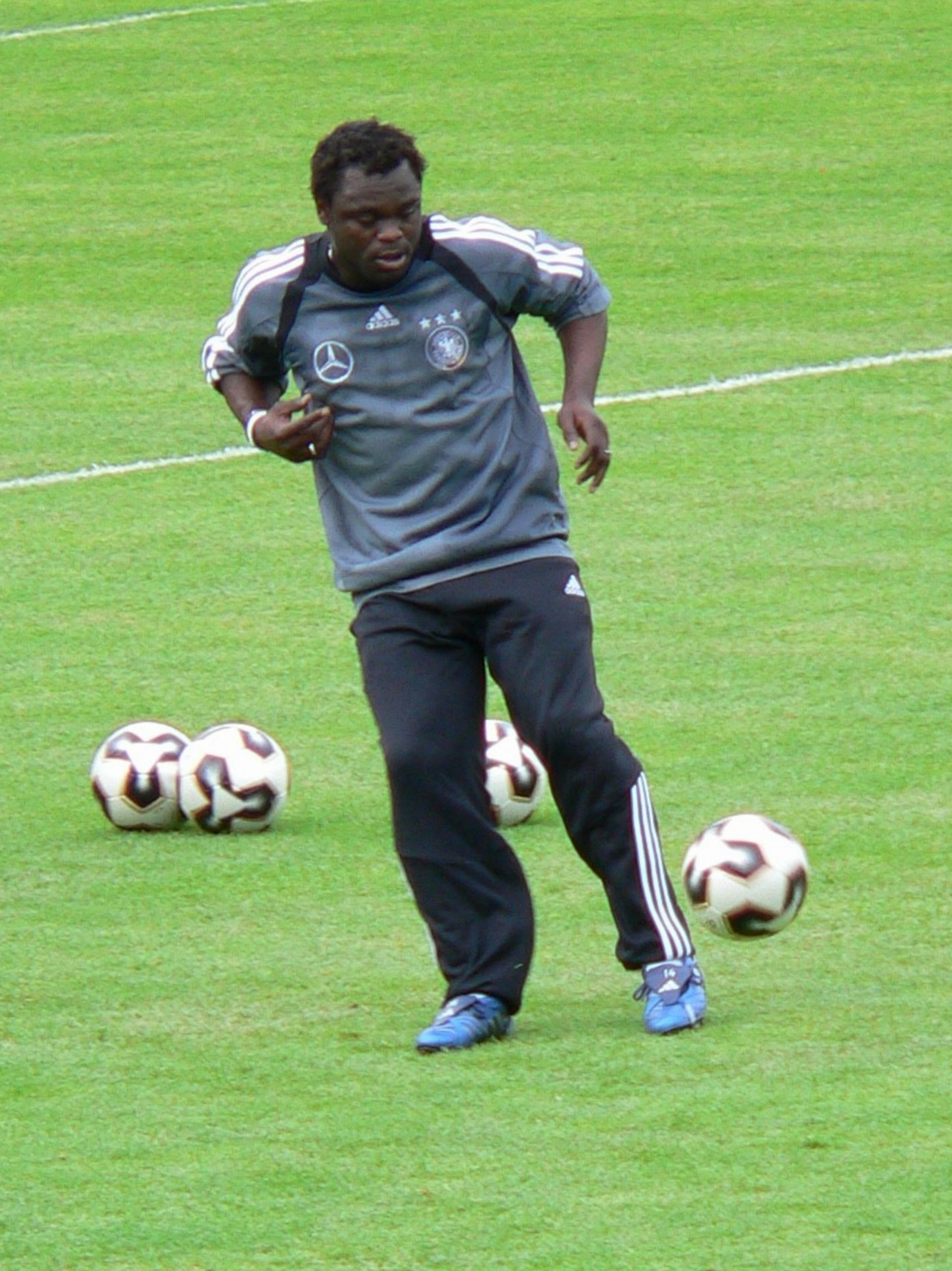
Gerald Asamoah, an Afro-German national football player, took part in the "Du bist Deutschland" campaign in 2005.

Europe is particularly important for immigration to Germany in quantitative terms. 59.9% of immigrants since 1950 came from Europe in 2008. 23.5% of them came from the then 27 member states of the European Union. The eleven most important countries of origin in 2008 were:

- Turkey (with 14.2% of all immigrants)
- Russia (8.4%)
- Poland (6.9%)
- Italy (4.2%)
- Serbia and Montenegro (3.4%) (two states since 2006, and the new state of Kosovo since 2008)
- Kazakhstan (3.3%)
- Romania (3.0%)
- Croatia (2.6%)
- Greece (2.2%)
- Bosnia and Herzegovina (2.2%)
- Ukraine (1.9%)

Statistical material can also be found in the ten graphics of a Spiegel Online article from 17 October 2010.

=== Migrant background in German cities ===
The major cities with a population with a migration background of at least 30 percent are mainly located in Hesse, Baden-Württemberg, Bavaria and North Rhine-Westphalia. The highest proportion, at 66.5 percent, is in Offenbach am Main, which borders Frankfurt directly and has around 135,000 inhabitants (as of 2023). At the same time, the city of Offenbach had the second lowest average age among German cities and districts in 2021 at 40.8 years. Frankfurt had the highest percentage among major cities with 500,000 or more inhabitants in 2023 at 57.0 percent, followed by Nuremberg with 51.6 percent (2024) and Munich with 49.5 percent (2024).

Large cities with 100,000 or more inhabitants with at least 30 percent of the population having a migration background
| City | State | Percent | Year | Source |
|---|---|---|---|---|
| Offenbach am Main | Hesse | 66.5 | 2023 | |
| Salzgitter | Lower Saxony | 60.2 | 2026 | |
| Pforzheim | Baden-Württemberg | 59.7 | 2023 | |
| Heilbronn | Baden-Württemberg | 58.3 | 2023 | |
| Frankfurt am Main | Hesse | 57.0 | 2023 | |
| Ludwigshafen am Rhein | Rhineland-Palatinate | 53.6 | 2022 | |
| Nürnberg | Bavaria | 51.6 | 2024 | |
| Hanau | Hesse | 50.0 | 2020 | |
| Augsburg | Bavaria | 49.9 | 2023 | |
| Ingolstadt | Bavaria | 49.5 | 2023 | |
| Munich | Bavaria | 49.5 | 2024 | |
| Stuttgart | Baden-Württemberg | 48.7 | 2023 | |
| Mannheim | Baden-Württemberg | 48.5 | 2023 | |
| Hagen | North Rhine-Westphalia | 47.2 | 2023 | |
| Duisburg | North Rhine-Westphalia | 46.5 | 2023 | |
| Darmstadt | Hesse | 45.5 | 2023 | |
| Düsseldorf | North Rhine-Westphalia | 45.3 | 2023 | |
| Ulm | Baden-Württemberg | 45.1 | 2023 | |
| Wuppertal | North Rhine-Westphalia | 44.4 | 2023 | |
| Kassel | Hessen | 44.3 | 2023 | |
| Fürth | Bavaria | 44.2 | 2022 | |
| Wolfsburg | Lower Saxony | 44,0 | 2024 | |
| Bremen | Bremen | 44.0 | 2023 | |
| Reutlingen | Baden-Württemberg | 43.8 | 2022 | |
| Wiesbaden | Hesse | 43.1 | 2023 | |
| Remscheid | North Rhine-Westphalia | 42.8 | 2023 | |
| Bielefeld | North Rhine-Westphalia | 42.6 | 2023 | |
| Köln | North Rhine-Westphalia | 42.4 | 2023 | |
| Hannover | Lower Saxony | 42.2 | 2023 | |
| Braunschweig | Lower Saxony | 42.2 | 2025 | |
| Dortmund | North Rhine-Westphalia | 41.0 | 2023 | |
| Hamm | North Rhine-Westphalia | 40.6 | 2023 | |
| Hamburg | Hamburg | 40.4 | 2023 | |
| Berlin | Berlin | 40.3 | 2024 | |
| Essen | North Rhine-Westphalia | 38,3 | 2022 | |
| Mainz | Rheinland Palastinate | 37.4 | 2024 | |
| Karlsruhe | Baden Württemberg | 36.8 | 2022 | |
| Herne | North Rhein-Westfalen | 35,9 | 2023 | |
| Göttingen | Lower Saxony | 35.4 | 2023 | |
| Bochum | North Rhein-Westfalen | 34,9 | 2024 | |
| Würzburg | Bavaria | 33,5 | 2024 | |
| Osnabrück | Lower Saxony | 33,4 | 2023 | |
| Saarbrücken | Saarland | 33,4 | 2023 | |
| Aachen | North Rhein-Westphalia | 32,8 | 2023 | |
| Freiburg im Breisgau | Baden Württemberg | 32.0 | 2022 | |
| Regensburg | Bavaria | 31,2 | 2017 | |
| Kiel | Schleswig Holstein | 30.7 | 2024 | |

=== Further statistical statements ===
==== By environment ====
In 2018, the Sinus Institute divided people with a migration background into ten social milieus known as the Sinus migrant milieus that differ in several respects:

| Sinus migrant milieus | Short description | Population share 2018 (in %) |
|---|---|---|
| Status-conscious milieu | Aspiring milieu with traditional roots that seeks to achieve material prosperity and social recognition through achievement and determination without giving up its ties to its culture of origin | 12% (approx. 1.8 million) |
| Traditional working-class environment | The established traditional milieu of migrant workers and late repatriates who strive for material security and recognition, who have adapted and maintain their (family) traditions of their country of origin without causing offence | 10% (approx. 1.5 million) |
| Religiously rooted milieu | The archaic, patriarchal, socially and culturally isolated milieu, stuck in the pre-modern patterns and religious traditions of the region of origin, with clear tendencies towards withdrawal and isolation | 6% (approx. 0.9 million) |
| Precarious Environment | The lower class, striving for orientation, home / identity and participation, with strong fears about the future, resentment and an often fatalistic attitude to life, who feel excluded and disadvantaged | 7% (approx. 1.1 million) |
| Consumer-hedonistic milieu | The young leisure-oriented lower class milieu with a deficient identity and underdog consciousness, in search of fun, entertainment and consumption, which refuses to conform to the performance and conformity expectations of the majority society | 8% (approx. 1.2 million) |
| Middle class | The hard-working and adaptable middle of the migrant population, who identify with the conditions in the host country, strive for social acceptance and belonging and want to live harmoniously and securely | 11% (approx. 1.7 million) |
| Adaptive-Pragmatic Milieu | The optimistic, performance- and family-oriented young mainstream with joy in technical progress, pragmatic-realistic goal definitions and a high willingness to adapt | 11% (approx. 1.7 million) |
| Experimentalist milieu | The individualistic milieu of fun and scene-oriented nonconformists with a pronounced love of experimentation, distance from the mainstream and focus on life in the here and now | 10% (approx. 1.5 million) |
| Milieu of the performers | The determined, multi-optional, globally thinking future optimists with a high affinity for technology and IT, great self-confidence and high style and consumption standards | 10% (approx. 1.5 million) |
| Intellectual-cosmopolitan milieu | The successful, enlightened educational elite with a liberal and post-materialistic attitude, a multicultural self-image and diverse intellectual interests | 13% (approx. 2.0 million) |

==== Social status ====
===== Migration background and health =====
People with a migration background in the living generation have worse health prospects. Maternal and infant mortality is increased, and infant and toddler mortality is 20 percent higher. Toddlers and school children are at above-average risk of accidents.

Social epidemiological research repeatedly points out that a particular burden on migrants can also be proven in the second and third generation.

In 2014, a representative study for Germany by Donath and colleagues showed that young people with a migration background living in Germany have a significantly higher risk of suicide attempts than their classmates without a migration background (study with over 44,000 9th grade students in Germany).

There are also negative health effects of self-reported experiences of discrimination among people with a migration background. The extent to which a migration background represents a medical risk factor for health-endangering substance use must be considered in a differentiated manner. It has been shown that young people with a migration background, for example, engage in binge drinking less often than young people without a migration background.

A representative study from 2016 also shows that young people with a migration background drink alcohol significantly less often than young people without a migration background. However, they showed significantly earlier and higher consumption of tobacco and cannabis than young people without a migration background. This applied to both boys and girls.

A study of adolescents with a migration background aged on average 15 years showed that the likelihood of binge drinking was positively associated with the type of school leaving certificate planned, with the family's independence from state financial support and with the adolescent's assimilation in the current (new) country. The risk of binge drinking among adolescents with a migration background was lower if they or their families preferred attitudes towards segregation from the current country of residence and strongly adhered to the traditions of their country of origin.

==== Migration background and academic success ====
===== Academic achievements =====
In 2014, 30.0% of the population with a migration background had a high school diploma or university of applied sciences entrance qualification, compared to 28.5% of the population without a migration background. At the same time, 46.5% of them have no vocational qualification, compared to 21.2% of the population without a migration background.

An OECD study from 2018 examined what percentage of students (with and without a migration background) have basic knowledge in the subjects of science, reading and mathematics. It was found that students with a migration background in both the first and second generation of immigrants performed significantly worse than students without a migration background. The difference was striking (more than 30 percentage points difference) in Finland, Austria, Belgium, Denmark, France, Sweden and Germany.

In 2006, sociologist Frank Gesemann showed that only 33.9% of foreign students in Germany attend a secondary school (middle school, high school), while this proportion is 60.8% for German students. The proportion of male students of non-German nationality who come from predominantly Muslim countries and attend a middle school or high school varies greatly, ranging from 50.2 percent (Iranians) to 12.7 percent (Lebanese). Attendance at secondary schools was also well below average among the group of Turks (26%), who represented the largest group among foreign students at 43.1%.

In 2002, academic Dietrich Thränhardt described statements about students with a migration background as "not very clear and meaningful". There are groups that do very well in the German school system, as well as those that do very poorly. The groups with the least success in school are those of Italian and Turkish nationals: in addition to a high number of school dropouts, both groups also have a particularly large group without any training, even if they have achieved a school leaving certificate (56.1% of Turks and 50.3% of Italians compared to 9.3% of Germans). The majority of students in these two groups are also found in Hauptschule, only smaller percentages attend Gymnasium and Realschulen.

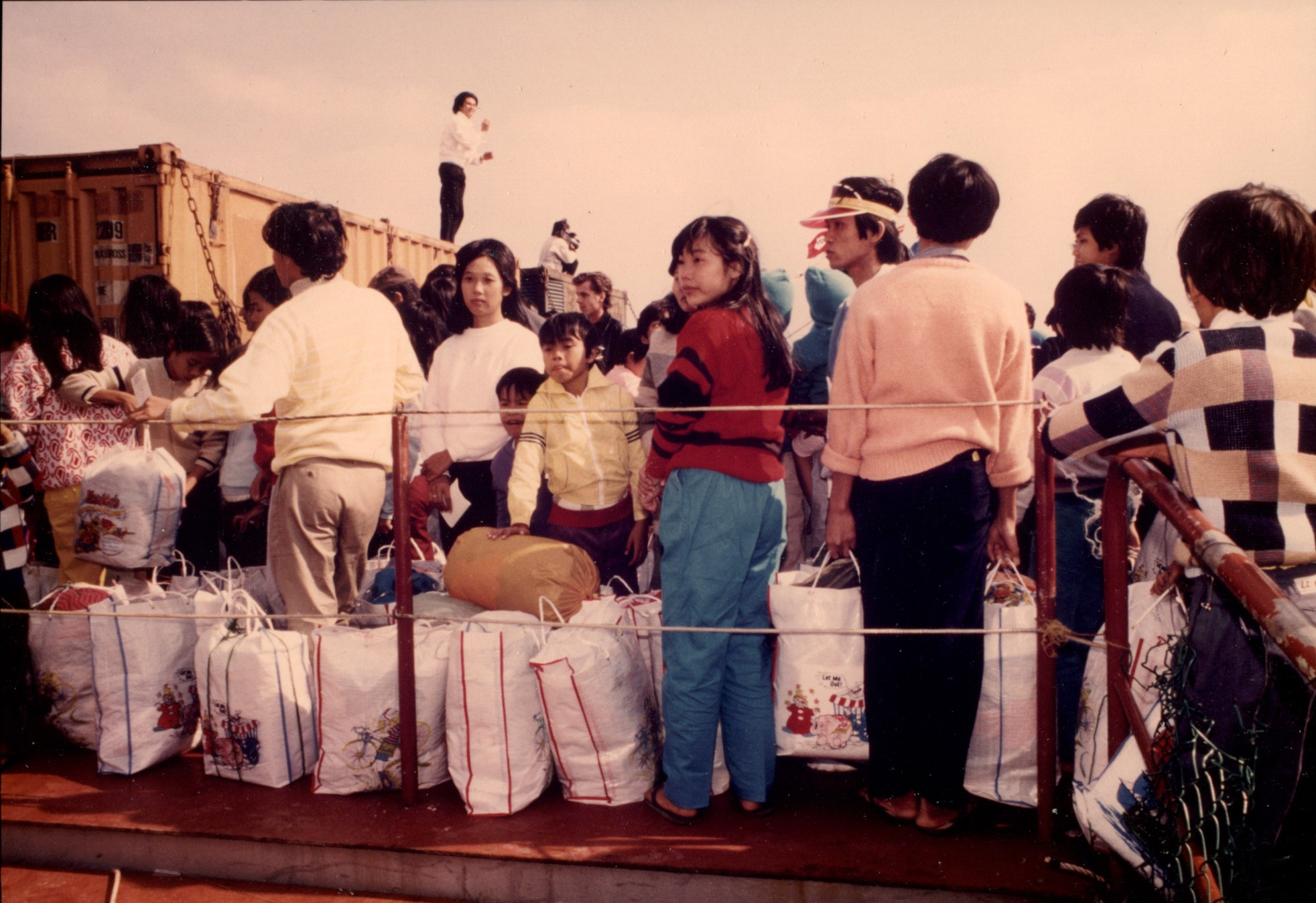
Vietnamese refugees landing in Hamburg in 1986

On the other hand, there are many secondary school and high school students among students of Spanish, Russian, Polish, Croatian and Bosnian origin. They achieve similar academic success to German students. Likewise, the proportion of students of Vietnamese origin who attend high school has been above average for years, as studies by Beuchling have shown.

The academic performance of children with an ex-Yugoslav background is significantly better than that of their Turkish and Italian classmates, but not as good as that of ethnic Germans and German students (see tables below).

Statistically, children with a Greek migration background are even more likely to attend high school than Germans. No other immigrant group in Germany is more successful at school than the Vietnamese: over 50 percent of their students make it to high school. This means that a higher percentage of Vietnamese young people are aiming for the Abitur than Germans.

According to Cornelia Kristen (2002), students from some migrant groups receive worse school grades despite achieving similar results to others. This was cited to them having to attend worse schools.

Grades are the most important factor for the type of school attended, but not the only one. Children of German nationality attend Hauptschule less often than migrant children, even if their grades are equally poor – a distinction was made between Turkish, Italian, Yugoslavian, ethnic German or "other" nationality. Migrant children instead attend Realschule more often. When moving on to Gymnasium, however, there is no longer any effect of nationality if grades are controlled for. Migrant children have a particularly poor chance of going to Gymnasium or Realschule if they attend a school with many other migrant children. In such schools, they perform worse and achieve worse grades than in more socially heterogeneous schools. This result takes on particular significance in view of the pronounced ethnic segregation tendencies in the German primary school system. In segregated school systems in particular, migrant children are particularly likely to end up in primary school classes whose student body is relatively homogeneous and at a low level.

In Germany and Austria, the Start scholarship program supports selected young people with a migration background who achieve good to very good school results and are socially active. A difficult family, economic or personal situation is also taken into account when selecting scholarship recipients.

===== Different academic achievements in East and West Germany =====
In all eastern German states, there are more high school graduates and fewer students in special education among foreign young people than in all western states. Foreign students in eastern Germany tend to be less successful in high school than their western-based counterparts In Brandenburg, 44% of all foreign young people leave school with a high school diploma. This means that in Brandenburg there are even more high school graduates among immigrants than among Germans. There are early support programs (especially for late repatriates) and kindergartens throughout the country.

===== Results of the PISA study =====
The special study Where Immigrant Students Succeed – a comparative Review of Performance and Engagement from PISA 2003 (German title: Where do students with a migration background have the greatest chances of success? – A comparative analysis of performance and engagement in PISA 2003 ) determined whether migrant children are just as successful in the school system as students without a migration background.

A first result was that there is no decisive connection between the number of students with a migration background in the sample countries on the one hand and the extent of the observed performance differences between students with and without a migration background on the other. This refutes the assumption that a high proportion of students with a migration background has a negative effect on integration.

In the country comparison of this study, Germany is at the bottom of the list when it comes to the integration of second-generation migrant children. Although the study attests that migrant children are willing to learn and have a positive attitude, their chances of success in the German education system are lower than in any of the other 17 countries examined:

- On average, migrant children lag behind children without a migrant background by 48 points; in Germany, however, the figure is 70 points lower. The differences are greatest in the natural sciences and smallest in reading skills.
- While in almost all other participating countries, second-generation migrant children achieve higher performance scores, in Germany these scores fall even further: second-generation migrant children are around two years behind their classmates. Over 40% of them do not achieve the basic skills of level 2 in mathematics and also perform similarly poorly in reading skills.

More detailed studies based on the "PISA 2000" study show that it is not the origin as such, but (in addition to the language spoken in the parental home [Esser 2001; Kristen 2002]) the educational level of the parents, especially the mother, that determines educational success – a connection that was also found for students without a migration background.

Credit points in mathematics of 15-year-old students
| | students without a migration background | first-generation students * | second-generation students ** |
|---|---|---|---|
| OECD average | 523 | 475 | 483 |
| Germany | 525 | 454 | 432 |
* born abroad, foreign parents ** born in the survey country, foreign parents

However, it would be a statistical fallacy to say that young people who are immigrants themselves achieve better results than second-generation young people according to this table. The families of students born in Germany with an immigrant background are mostly of Turkish origin and these people perform particularly poorly in PISA. Among young people who are immigrants themselves, young people from ethnic German families are more strongly represented. These are usually better performers. It cannot therefore be said that the situation in Germany is getting worse over the generations. On the contrary: within the individual groups of origin, the educational situation seems to be improving from generation to generation.

For each individual country of origin, young people born in Germany (i.e. second-generation students) achieve better results than young people born abroad (i.e. first-generation students). This is shown for example in the case of young people from the former Yugoslavia and Turkey in the area of mathematics. The same applies to other groups of origin and the areas of science and reading skills:

| Family origin | Migration status | Credit points in mathematics |
|---|---|---|
| former Yugoslavia | born in Germany | 472 |
| former Yugoslavia | immigrated | 420 |
| Türkiye | born in Germany | 411 |
| Türkiye | immigrated | 382 |

Effects of language-heavy test tasks

It is possible that the poor performance of young people with a migration background in PISA is a result of language-heavy test items. The items in PISA differ in terms of their language-heavy nature. In particular, items that measure technical skills require minimal language instructions, while others require more text.

It was examined whether students with a migration background solved less language-intensive tasks better. This was not the case. Instead, the opposite appears to be the case: students with a migration background perform slightly better on language-intensive tasks than on relatively language-free tasks. The reasons for this are unclear. It is clear that the low average competence of students with a migration background is not due to poorer results in language-dependent sub-competencies.

==== Migration Background and Integration into the Labour Market ====
Since January 2005, the Integration through Qualification network has been operating nationwide to improve integration into the labour market for people with a migration background. Since January 2011, there has been a funding program that creates and promotes structures and process chains to improve integration into the labour market.

Various studies and experiments show that applications from people whose names indicate a migration background – especially those with Arabic-sounding names – are less likely to be considered when they are equally qualified.

After the start of the migration background survey (HEGA 07/2011-07), the Federal Employment Agency (BA) announced that it is obliged to collect data on migration backgrounds and to take them into account in its labor market and basic security statistics (Section 281 Paragraph 2 SGB III, Section 53 Paragraph 7 Sentence 1 SGB II). Answering the questions is voluntary. The data is entered into the central personal data management system (zPDV) and may only be used for statistical purposes. Details of the procedure are contained in the Migration Background Survey Ordinance (MighEV).

== Austria ==
The definition of people with a migration background in Austria corresponds to that of the Recommendations for the 2010 censuses of population and housing issued by the United Nations Economic Commission for Europe (UNECE). Accordingly, in Austria, people with a migration background are referred to as such if both parents were born abroad. In addition, a distinction is made between:

- First-generation migrants whose own place of birth, as well as that of both parents, is abroad.
- Second-generation migrants whose own place of birth is in Austria and that of both parents abroad.

The migration background according to this definition can only be represented since 2008 using the microcensus labour force survey. According to this, in 2008, 1.426 million people in Austria, or 17.4% of the Austrian population, had a migration background – that is, two parents born abroad. 1.063 million of them were themselves born abroad and thus correspond to people with a migration background of the first generation. The remaining 363,300 people of the second generation were already born in Austria, but the place of birth of both parents is abroad. On average in 2019, the number of people with a migration background living in Austria was 2.070 million (23.7% of the population), of which 1.528 million were first-generation immigrants and around 542,000 people with a second-generation migration background.

Overall, in 2019, only around 36% of people with a migration background living in Austria had Austrian citizenship – among first-generation citizens, the proportion was 27% and among second-generation citizens, 63%. In 2022, the proportion of people with a migration background was only above the national average of 27.2% in the federal capital Vienna with 50.3% and in Vorarlberg with 29.1%.

Population with a migration background in the Austrian federal states (2023)
| Federal State | Population in private households | Proportion of the population with a migration background (in %) |
|---|---|---|
| Wien | 1,953,300 | 50.3 |
| Vorarlberg | 403,200 | 29.1 |
| Salzburg | 560,200 | 26.5 |
| Tirol | 760,800 | 24.5 |
| Oberösterreich | 1,505,200 | 22.5 |
| Niederösterreich | 1,701,800 | 18.3 |
| Steiermark | 1,247,000 | 18.1 |
| Kärnten | 560,300 | 16.4 |
| Burgenland | 297,500 | 15.5 |

Migrant background is considered a factor in Austrian young peoples mental health during the COVID-19 pandemic.

== Switzerland ==
According to the Federal Statistical Office (FSO), a person with a migration background is defined as a person – regardless of their nationality:

- who immigrated to Switzerland as a migrant;
- whose immediate (direct) descendants were born in Switzerland;
- whose parents were born abroad.

Of the approximately 8.1 million inhabitants, the Federal Statistical Office has collected the following data on migration status – but only for residents aged 15 and over: In the whole of Switzerland, 2,374,000 inhabitants (35 percent) have a migration background.

Children of migrants born in Switzerland are called Secondos. In order to integrate some individuals adopt Swiss names. They are considered disadvantaged compared to natives.

On 12 February 2017, the "Federal Decree of 30 September 2016 on the simplified naturalisation of third-generation foreigners" was adopted in a referendum. The decree is intended to facilitate naturalisation for grandchildren of immigrants born in Switzerland. People of migrant background are disadvantaged.

== Other countries ==
The recording of migration background or other comparable statistical or socio-demographic categories varies worldwide both in terms of data collection and the aggregation of domestically and foreign-born populations. The term is translated into English by the EU as migratory background but is not used according to this definition in the Anglophone countries.

In the United States and Canada, the population is recorded according to the immigrant generation. First generation (or foreign born) immigrants are those whose parents do not have citizenship of the destination country; second generation are those who were born in the country and have at least one immigrant parent. Third generation refers to people who were born in the country and both parents were also born there.

In the United Kingdom, the category of immigrant is used for statistical purposes. Immigrants are classified in different ways to describe economic migrants and asylum seekers.

Children of migrants born in the United Kingdom are not themselves considered migrants. In addition, unlike in Germany, ethnic groups are recorded. The situation is similar in Poland, where immigrants (przybysze) and members of national or ethnic minorities are recorded.

In France, foreigners (étranger), immigrants (immigré, which includes foreign nationals and naturalised citizens), and occasionally children of immigrants (descendants d'immigrés) are recorded statistically. The latter include children with at least one immigrant parent.

In the Netherlands, since 1995, people have been recorded as autochthonous, allochthonous from Western countries of origin (including Europe, North America, Oceania, Japan and Indonesia) and allochthonous from non-Western countries of origin. The country of birth of the parents' and grandparents' generation plays a role in the categorization as allochthonous. In 2016, the Dutch government's Scientific Council recommended speaking of "residents with a migration background" (inwoners met migratieachtergrond) and "residents with a Dutch background" (Inwoners met nederlandse achtergrond).

In Sweden, a foreign background (utländsk bakgrund) is recorded for people whose parents were both born abroad, including people born in Sweden. People who have one parent born in Sweden and one born abroad do not have a foreign background. In addition, people born abroad (utrikes födda) are counted. People born abroad to Swedish parents are not counted as immigrants.

In Spain, the population of immigrants (inmigrante) has grown over time. In the 2000s its foreign-born population increasing from 2% in 2000 to 11% in 2007.

In Turkey, immigrants (göçmen) have gained prominence in recent years. The mass migration of Syrian refugees since 2011 turned Turkey into a net-immigration country. This has not been without controversy.

== Controversy ==
The category of migration background (German: Migrationshintergrund) marks people who, due to their migration history or that of their family, do not conform to the unquestioned norm. They are expected to integrate into the majority society, but people without a migration background do not have to. The category thus perpetuates the exclusion of people identified as migrants. It creates the impression that difference is not constitutive for every society, but is only attributed to "the others" (othering), namely people with a migration background. For this reason, social scientists and those affected criticize the term and recommend that it be abandoned. The German ethnologist Martin Sökefeld, on the other hand, points out that the category was created to identify discrimination and counteract it with support measures. Abolishing the category would not eliminate the discrimination that actually exists. He therefore advocates problematizing it and continuing to use it in a reflective manner. This is the only way to achieve the goal of making language use as unessentialist and exclusionary as possible.

== Literature ==
- Stefan Böckler, Ansgar Schmitz-Veltin (Hrsg.): Migrationshintergrund in der Statistik – Definition, Erfassung und Vergleichbarkeit. In: Materialien zur Bevölkerungsstatistik. Heft 2, Verband Deutscher Städtestatistiker, Köln 2013, ISBN 978-3-922421-53-5 (PDF-Download möglich).
- Bundeszentrale für politische Bildung (Hrsg.): Lebenswelten von Migrantinnen und Migranten. In: Aus Politik und Zeitgeschichte. Heft 5, 2009 (PDF; 2,8 MB auf bpb.de).
- Ruth-Esther Geiger: Ihr seid Deutschland, wir auch. Junge Migranten erzählen. Suhrkamp, Frankfurt am Main 2008, ISBN 978-3-518-46009-2
- Helmut Groschwitz: Kritische Anmerkungen zur populären Zuschreibung „Migrationshintergrund". In: Rheinisches Jahrbuch für Volkskunde 39 (2011/2012), S. 129–141. Volltext auf academia.edu.
- Léa Renard: Mit den Augen der Statistiker.Deutsche Kategorisierungspraktiken von Migration im historischen Wandel, in: Zeithistorische Forschungen 15 (2018), S. 431–451.
- Ilka Sommer, Andreas Heimer, Melanie Henkel: Familien mit Migrationshintergrund. Lebenssituation, Erwerbsbeteiligung und Vereinbarkeit von Familie und Beruf. Prognos AG, Geschäftsstelle Zukunftsrat Familie des Bundesministeriums für Familie, Senioren, Frauen und Jugend, Berlin November 2010 (PDF; 2,9 MB; 106 Seiten auf prognos.com).
- Erol Yildiz, Marc Hill (Hrsg.): Nach der Migration. Postmigrantische Perspektiven jenseits der Parallelgesellschaft. transcript-Verlag, Bielefeld 2015, ISBN 978-3-8376-2504-2
