= Berlin population statistics =

Berlin is the most populous city in the European Union, as calculated by city-proper population (not metropolitan area).

== Population by borough ==
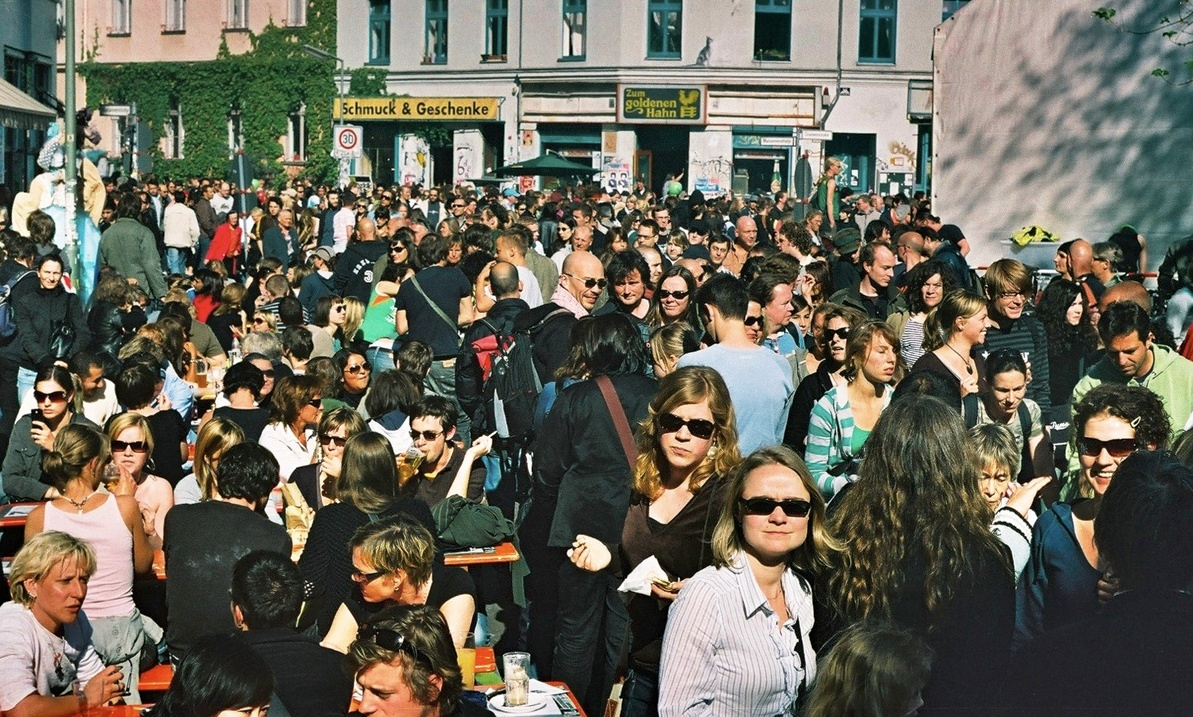
in Kreuzberg

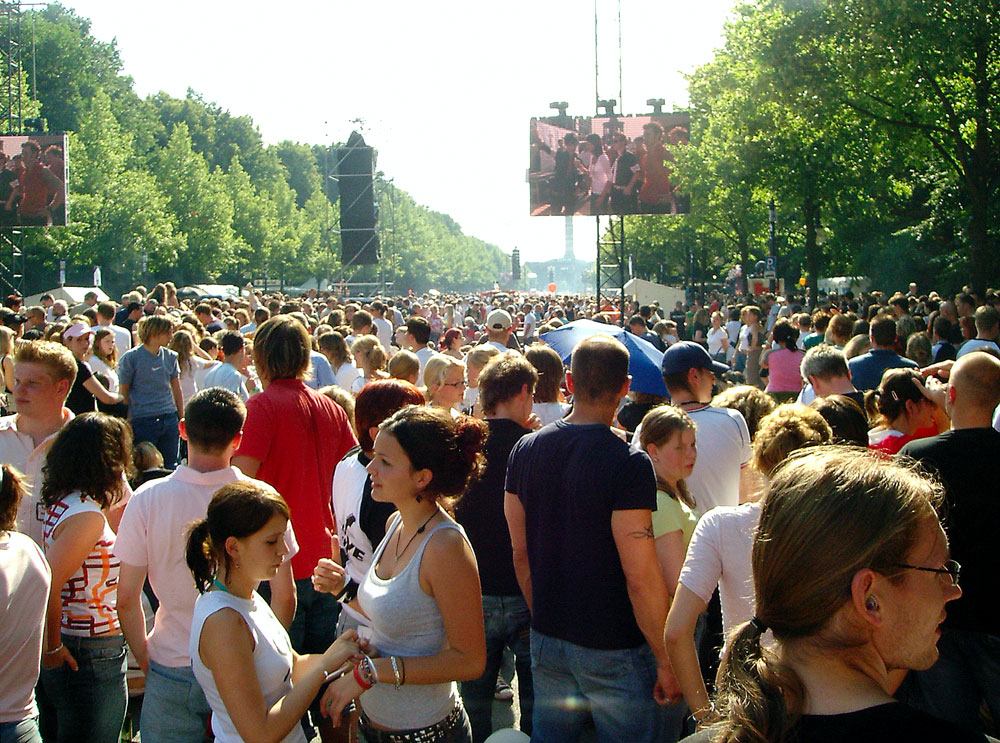
Berliners at the Tiergarten

| Borough | Population 30 September 2010 | Area in km^{2} | Largest Non-German ethnic groups |
|---|---|---|---|
| Mitte | 332,100 | 39.47 | Turks, Arabs, Kurds, many Asians, Africans and Western Europeans. |
| Friedrichshain-Kreuzberg | 268,831 | 20.16 | Turks, Arabs, African, Kurds, Chinese |
| Pankow | 368,956 | 103.01 | Poles, Italians, French, Americans, Vietnamese, British |
| Charlottenburg-Wilmersdorf | 320,014 | 64.72 | Turks, Africans, Russians, Arabs, others. |
| Spandau | 225,420 | 91.91 | Turks, Africans, Russians, Arabs, others. |
| Steglitz-Zehlendorf | 293,989 | 102.50 | Poles, Turks, Croats, Serbs, Koreans |
| Tempelhof-Schöneberg | 335,060 | 53.09 | Turks, Croats, Serbs, Koreans, Africans |
| Neukölln | 310,283 | 44.93 | Arabs, Turks, Kurds, Russians, Africans, Poles |
| Treptow-Köpenick | 241,335 | 168.42 | Russians, Poles, Ukrainians, Vietnamese |
| Marzahn-Hellersdorf | 248,264 | 61.74 | Russians, Vietnamese, several other Eastern Europeans. |
| Lichtenberg | 259,881 | 52.29 | Vietnamese, Russians, Ukrainians, Poles, Chinese |
| Reinickendorf | 240,454 | 89.46 | Turks, Poles, Serbs, Croats, Arabs, Italians |
| Total Berlin | 3,450,889 | 891.82 | Turks, Arabs, Russians, Vietnamese, Poles, Africans |

== Historical development of Berlin's population ==
Berlin's population development since 1920

| Year | Population |
|---|---|
| 1250 | 1,200 |
| 1307 | 7,000 |
| 1400 | 8,500 |
| 1576 | 12,000 |
| 1600 | 9,000 |
| 1631 | 8,100 |
| 1648 | 6,000 |
| 1685 | 17,500 |
| 1709 | 57,000 |
| 1750 | 113,289 |
| 1775 | 136,137 |
| 1800 | 172,132 |
| 1825 | 219,968 |
| December 3, 1840 ¹ | 322,626 |
| December 3, 1846 ¹ | 408,500 |
| December 3, 1849 ¹ | 418,733 |

| Year | Population |
|---|---|
| December 3, 1852 ¹ | 426,600 |
| December 3, 1855 ¹ | 442,500 |
| December 3, 1858 ¹ | 463,600 |
| December 3, 1861 ¹ | 524,900 |
| December 3, 1864 ¹ | 632,700 |
| December 3, 1867 ¹ | 702,400 |
| December 1, 1871 ¹ | 826,341 |
| December 1, 1875 ¹ | 969,050 |
| December 1, 1880 ¹ | 1,122,330 |
| December 1, 1885 ¹ | 1,315,287 |
| December 1, 1890 ¹ | 1,578,794 |
| December 2, 1895 ¹ | 1,678,924 |
| December 1, 1900 ¹ | 1,888,848 |
| December 1, 1905 ¹ | 2,042,402 |
| December 1, 1910 ¹ | 2,071,257 |
| December 1, 1916 ¹ | 1,712,679 |

| Year | Population |
|---|---|
| December 5, 1917 ¹ | 1,681,916 |
| October 8, 1919 ¹ | 1,902,509 |
| June 16, 1925 ¹ | 4,024,286 |
| June 16, 1933 ¹ | 4,242,501 |
| May 17, 1939 ¹ | 4,338,756 |
| August 12, 1945 ¹ | 2,807,405 |
| October 29, 1946 ¹ | 3,170,832 |
| December 31, 1950 | 3,336,026 |
| December 31, 1960 | 3,274,016 |
| December 31, 1970 | 3,208,719 |
| December 31, 1980 | 3,048,759 |
| December 31, 1990 | 3,433,695 |
| December 31, 2000 | 3,382,169 |
| September 30, 2005 | 3,394,000 |
| December 31, 2010 | 3,460,725 |
| December 31, 2020 | 3,664,088 |

The spike in population in 1920 is a result of the Greater Berlin Act.

== Population by nationality ==
| Country of origin | Population |
|---|---|
| Germany | 2,525,000 |
| Russia (incl. Russian-Germans) | Est. 300,000 |
| Turkey | 250,000–300,000 (see: Turks in Berlin) |
| Poland | Est. 300,000- 340.000 |
| Vietnam | Est. 83,000 |
| Arab League | Est. 70,000 (see: Arabs in Berlin) |
| Ghana | Est. 20,000 (estimations vary from 15,000 to 25,000). Actually there are about 1,800 Ghanaian citizens residing in Berlin, however, there are many Germans of Ghanaian and other West-African origin or with one parent being German and the other being from Ghana. |
| Bosnia and Herzegovina; China; Croatia; Greece; Italy; Iran; Serbia; United States | Almost or at least 20,000 |

Berlin has a large population of a migration background. On 31 December 2010 the largest groups by foreign nationality were citizens from Turkey (104,556), Poland (40,988), Serbia (19,230), Italy (15,842), Russia (15,332), United States (12,733), France (13,262), Vietnam (13,199), Croatia (10,104), Bosnia and Herzegovina (10,198), UK (10,191), Greece (9,301), Austria (9,246), Ukraine (8,324), Lebanon (7,078), Spain (7,670), Bulgaria (9,988), the People's Republic of China (5,632), Thailand (5,037). There is also a large Arabic community, mostly from Lebanon, Palestine and Iraq. Additionally, Berlin has one of the largest Vietnamese communities outside Vietnam, with about 83,000 people of Vietnamese origin.

== See also ==
- Demographics of Berlin
- Demographics of Cologne
- Demographics of Hamburg
- Demographics of Munich
