= Arabs in Germany =

Ethnic Arabs living in Germany

Arabs in Germany Araber in Deutschland العرب في المانيا
- Distribution of citizens of Arab countries in Germany (2021)

Total population
- approximately 1-2 million people with a background from an Arabic-speaking country

Regions with significant populations
- Berlin, Bochum, Bonn, Bremen, Cologne, Dortmund, Duisburg, Düsseldorf, Essen, Frankfurt, Gelsenkirchen, Hamburg, Hanover, Leipzig, Munich, Offenbach, Wuppertal, Mainz, Braunschweig, Nürnberg

Languages
- Arabic • German

Religion
- Majority Islam (mainly Sunni Islam, minorities Twelver Shia Islam, Alevism, Alawites, Sufism, Isma'ilism, Zaidiyyah, Ibadi); Christianity (mainly Syriac Orthodox Church, minorities Eastern Catholic Churches, Oriental Orthodoxy, Syriac Maronite Church, Coptic Orthodox Church); Druze; Mandaeans; Atheism

Related ethnic groups
- Arabs (Arab diaspora)

Arab Germans, also referred to as German Arabs or Arabic Germans (German: Araber in Deutschland/Deutsch-Araber; Arabic: العرب في المانيا), form the second-largest predominantly Muslim immigrant group.

The largest group of Arabs living in Germany is from Syria, with 1,281,000 people with a Syrian immigrant background in 2023. Syrians mostly arrived in Germany after 2015, when the German government under Angela Merkel decided to keep the borders open to refugees from the Syrian civil war. Since then, they have been by far the largest group of immigrants to Germany. To a lesser extent, there had been Arab immigration before, most notably by Moroccans during the guest worker movement or by Palestinian and Lebanese immigrants who moved to Germany, especially West Berlin, in the 1980s. The majority of Arabs in Germany are refugees from the conflicts in the Middle East.

== History ==
The first notable Arab-German was Emily Ruete, born 1844, originally Salama bint Said, a Princess of Zanzibar who became pregnant by a German man who was her neighbor. Fearing retaliation, she eloped with him to Germany, converted to Christianity, and married him. She later published her autobiography, “Memoirs of an Arabian Princess”.

== Geographical distribution ==
The largest concentration of Arab people in Germany lives in Berlin, where they make up 2%–3% (100,000 people) of the population. The percentage is significantly higher in the Berlin neighborhoods of Neukölln, Kreuzberg and Gesundbrunnen. Other centres of Arab population in Germany can be found in the Rhine-Ruhr metropolitan region, Frankfurt, Munich, Hanover and Hamburg. Most Arabs reside in urban areas and cities in former West-Germany. The only place in former Eastern Germany with a sizeable number of Arabs is Leipzig, where people of Arab descent make up 0.8% of the total population (4,000 out of 522,800). Among the German districts with the highest share of Arab migrants in 2011 were cities in the Frankfurt Rhine-Main Metropolitan Region (Frankfurt, Offenbach) and the Rhineland (Bonn, Düsseldorf) with large groups of Moroccan migrants.

No	Country of birth	Population (2015)	Population (2016)	Population (2017)	Population (2020)
1.	Syria	366,556	637,845	698,950	818,460
2.	Iraq	136,399	227,195	237,365	259,500
3.	Morocco	72,129	75,855	75,620	79,725
4.	Lebanon	37,160	41,445	41,375	41,090
5.	Somalia	23,350	33,900	38,675	47,495
6.	Tunisia	30,696	32,900	34,140	38,405
7.	Egypt	22,979	26,915	29,600	37,430
8.	Algeria	20,505	21,320	19,845	19,160
9.	Libya	13,123	14,265	14,805	14,900
10.	Jordan	10,041	10,755	11,520	13,340
11.	Sudan	7,145	7,715	7,760	7,605
12.	Yemen	4,150	4,870	5,540	7,845
13.	Saudi Arabia	6,207	5,835	5,350	4,665
14.	Palestine	2,531	3,470	3,770	4,540
15.	Kuwait	3,043	3,845	3,310	2,525
16.	UAE	3,551	4,185	3,715	2,260
17.	Qatar	1,047	1,085	1,060	1,025
18.	Mauritania	704	750	740	770
19.	Oman	620	600	540	435
20.	Bahrain	390	435	480	545
21.	Djibouti	104	125	135	160
22.	Comoros	68	80	70	70
Σ 22	Total	762,498	1,155,390	1,234,635	1,401,950

== Notable Germans of Arab descent ==
- Hamed Abdel-Samad, political scientist and author of Egyptian origin
- Khalid al-Maaly, Arab writer and publisher of Iraqi origin
- Hans Hauck, son of Algerian soldier
- Lamya Kaddor, scholar of Islamic studies and writer of Syrian origin
- Adel Karasholi, writer of Syrian origin
- Souad Mekhennet journalist and author of Moroccan origin
- Bassam Tibi, Syrian-born political scientist
- Najem Wali journalist and novelist of Iraqi origin

Film, television, acting

- Lexi Alexander, film director of Palestinian origin
- Elyas M'Barek, actor of Tunisian/Austrian origins
- Hisham Zreiq, filmmaker and visual artist of Palestinian origin

Music

- Laith Al-Deen, pop musician of Iraqi origin
- Farid Bang rapper of Moroccan origin
- Bushido, rapper of Tunisian origin
- Tony D, rapper of Lebanese origin
- Samy Deluxe, rapper and hip hop artist of Sudanese origin
- Loco Dice, DJ and electronic music producer of Tunisian origin
- Senna Gammour, pop singer and songwriter of Algerian-Moroccan origin
- Fady Maalouf, singer of Lebanese origin
- Massiv, rapper of Palestinian origin
- Baba Saad, rapper of Lebanese origin
- Tarééc, singer of Lebanese-Palestinian origin
- Adel Tawil, singer of Egyptian-Tunisian origin
- Safy Boutella, musician of Algerian origin

Politicians

- Sanae Abdi, politician of Moroccan origin
- Alaa Alhamwi, politician of Syrian origin
- Tarek Al-Wazir, politician of Yemeni origin

Sports

- Carlo Boukhalfa, footballer of Algerian origin
- Jérome Polenz, footballer of Algerian origin
- Mustapha Amari, football player of Algerian origin
- Mohamed Amsif, footballer of Moroccan origin
- Nassim Banouas, footballer of Algerian origin
- Mohammad Baghdadi, football player of Lebanese origin
- Karim Bellarabi, footballer of Moroccan origin
- Karim Benyamina, football player of Algerian origin
- Soufian Benyamina, football player of Algerian origin
- Sofian Chahed, footballer of Tunisian origin
- Mounir Chaftar, footballer of Tunisian origin
- Adil Chihi, footballer of Moroccan origin
- Amin Younes, footballer of Lebanese origin
- Daniel Brückner, German-Algerian footballer
- Rola El-Halabi, boxer of Syrian and Lebanese origin
- Rachid El Hammouchi footballer of Moroccan origin
- Rafed El-Masri, swimmer of Syrian origin
- Rani Khedira, football player of Tunisian origin
- Sami Khedira, football player of Tunisian origin
- Malik Fathi, footballer of Sudannese origin
- Murat Salar, football player of Egyptian-Turkish origin
- Mahmoud Charr, WBA heavyweight champion boxer of Lebanese/Syrian origin
- Yassin Ibrahim, football player of Sudanese origin
- Hany Mukhtar, football player of Sudanese origin

== See also ==
- Arabs in Berlin
- Arabs in Europe
- Arab diaspora
