= Arabs in Berlin =

Arabs in Berlin العرب في برلين
Total population
- Estimated at around 182,635 (4.7%)

Regions with significant populations
- Berlin; Neukölln, Schöneberg, Gesundbrunnen, Moabit, Kreuzberg

Languages
- German · Arabic

Religion
- Predominantly Muslim; large Christian minority among Levantine Arabs

Arabs in Berlin form the second-largest ethnic minority group in Berlin, after the Turkish, surpassing Polish and Russian community. As of December 2023, there are 182,635 people of any Arab origin residing in the city, which corresponds to 4.7% of the population, an increase of 1.2% from 2017 percentage.

== History ==
Most Arabs came to Germany in the 1970s, partly as Gastarbeiter from Morocco, the Turkish Province of Mardin (see: Arabs in Turkey) and Tunisia. However, the majority of Arabs in Berlin are refugees of the conflicts in the Middle East, e.g. the Lebanon Wars, Palestinian exodus, the recent Iraq War, Libyan Civil War and Syrian Civil War. The Arabs in Berlin are not a homogeneous group because they originate from about 20 countries.

== Distribution ==
Similar to the Turkish community, Arab people are primarily concentrated in the inner-city boroughs of former West Berlin.

Top 5 Berlin boroughs with largest population claiming Arab descent
Rank	Borough	Population	Percentage
1	Neukölln	15,641	5.1%
2	Mitte	15,489	4.6%
3	Tempelhof-Schöneberg	7,478	2.2%
4	Kreuzberg	7,306	2.7%
5	Charlottenburg-Wilmersdorf	6,864	2.1%

In the case of Neukölln, 80% of Arabs live in the same-named locality of Neukölln, forming up to 10% of the populace. Around 35,000 are of Palestinian and 15,000 of Lebanese origin. The rest of 20,000 are mostly of Moroccan, Iraqi, Algerian, Egyptian, Tunisian, Libyan and Syrian origin.

As of 2023, a total of 506,197, or 13.08% of Berlin's total population, originated from Islamic countries in the Organisation of Islamic Cooperation.

== See also ==
- Arab diaspora
- Arabs in Germany
- Arabs in Europe
- Lebanese diaspora
- Syrian diaspora
- Palestinian diaspora
- Moroccan diaspora
- Iraqi diaspora
- Egyptian diaspora
- Saudi diaspora
