= Demographics of Hamburg =

- Population pyramid of Hamburg in 2022
- Population: 1,787,408 (2015)

Historical population
Year	Pop.
950	500
1200	1,500
1430	16,000
1600	40,000
1650	60,000
1800	130,000
1840	136,956
1871	240,251
1900	705,738
1910	931,035
1925	1,079,126
1939	1,711,877
1946	1,403,300
1956	1,751,289
1961	1,832,346
1970	1,793,640
1975	1,717,383
1980	1,645,095
1985	1,579,884
1990	1,652,363
1995	1,707,901
2000	1,715,392
2005	1,743,627
2010	1,786,448
2015	1,787,408
Note: Years 950–1800; Years 1840–1961; Years 1970–2006, source:

The German city of Hamburg is the most populous city in the European Union which is not a national capital. The city contains an approximate 1.88 million people.

The figures since 1970 are published by the Statistical Office for Hamburg and Schleswig Holstein, based on the information of several state authorities.

== Population ==
On December 31, 2006 there were 1,754,182 registered people living in Hamburg (up from 1,652,363 in 1990). The population density was 2,322/km^{2} (6,010/sq mi).

There were 856,132 males and 898,050 females in Hamburg. For every 1,000 males there were 1,049 females. In 2006 there were 16,089 births in Hamburg, of which 33.1% were given by unmarried women, 6,921 marriages and 4,583 divorces. In 2006, 198 registered partnerships took place at the civil registration office (Standesamt). 40 partnerships were dissolved by court order since 2001. The age distribution was 15.7% under the age of 18, and 18.8% were 65 or older. In 2006, there were 257,060 foreign residents were living in Hamburg (14.8% of the population). The largest group being Turkish nationals at 58,154 (22.6% of foreign residents ), followed by 20,743 Polish nationals. 4,046 people were from the United Kingdom and 4,369 were from the United States. According to GTZ, 22,000 immigrants living in Hamburg are from Afghanistan, thus forming the largest Afghan community in Germany and Europe.

Population based on age
December 31, 2006

Age	Total	Percentage	Male	Percentage	Female	Percentage	Females / 1,000 males
Below 1	15,908	0.9	8,255	1.0	7,653	0.9	927
1–3	31,195	1.8	15,916	1.9	15,279	1.7	960
3–5	29,909	1.7	15,310	1,8	14,599	1.6	954
5–10	74,060	4.2	37,970	4.4	36,090	4,0	950
10–15	73,864	4.2	37,929	4.4	35,935	4.0	947
15–18	48,319	2.8	24,818	2.9	23,501	2.6	947
18–21	53,293	3.0	26,486	3.1	26,807	3.0	1,012
21–25	90,536	5.2	43,483	5.1	47,053	5.2	1,082
25–30	137,695	7.8	67,281	7.9	70,414	7.8	1,047
30–35	135,858	7.7	70,219	8.2	65,639	7.3	935
35–40	154,995	8.8	82,097	9.6	72,898	8.1	888
40–45	157,594	9.0	82,862	9.7	74,732	8.3	902
45–55	230,492	13.1	116,172	13.6	114,320	12.7	984
55–60	100,065	5.7	48,745	5.7	51,320	5.7	1,053
60–65	94,760	5.4	46,567	5.4	48,193	5.4	1,035
65–75	183,263	10.4	84,612	9.9	98,651	11.0	1,166
75 and older	142,376	8.1	47,410	5.5	94.966	10.6	2,003
Total	1,754,182	100	856,132	100	898,050	100	1,049

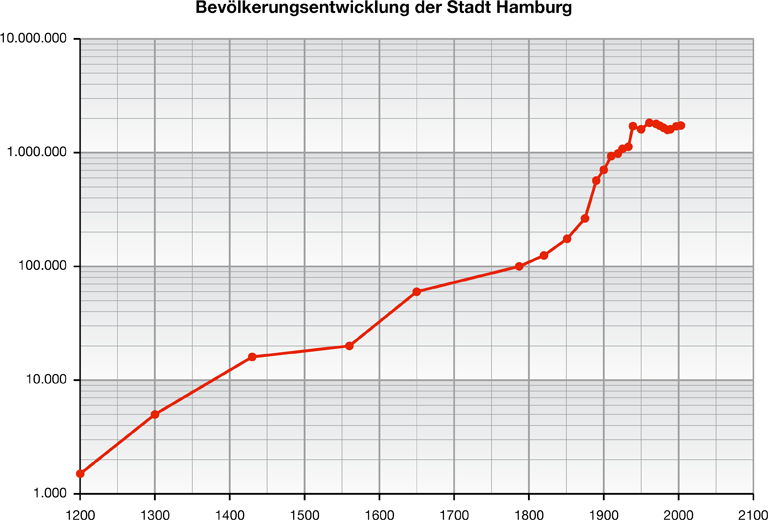
Demographics (German graphic)

After a descent of the population in the 1970s, Hamburg has constantly grown since 1999. However, the number of deaths were greater than the number of births until 2010.

Fluctuations 1970–2015

Year	Births	Deaths	Move in	Move out	Balance
1970	18,390	26,561	83,366	80,947	-5,752
1975	13,192	26,099	66,557	70,069	-16,419
1980	13,580	23,726	66,496	64,298	-7,948
1985	12,711	22,266	56,784	59,792	-12,563
1990	16,693	21,199	94,215	63,566	+26,143
1991	16,503	21,434	79,052	57,727	+16,394
1992	16,497	20,444	91,383	67,408	+20,028
1993	16,257	20,703	89,208	70,660	+14,102
1994	16,201	20,241	77,523	70,498	+2,985
1995	15,872	20,276	75,104	68,671	+2,029
1996	16,594	20,196	73,908	70,221	+85
1997	16,970	19,328	73,648	74,545	-3,255
1998	16,235	19,228	74,880	76,529	-4,642
1999	16,034	18,561	78,652	71,479	+4,646
2000	16,159	18,210	82,424	69,716	+10,657
2001	15,786	17,869	82,352	68,916	+11,353
2002	15,707	18,424	80,335	74,921	+2,697
2003	15,916	18,072	79,481	71,829	+5,496
2004	16,103	17,562	84,590	82,139	+992
2005	16,179	17,374	81,726	71,602	+8,929
2006	16,089	17,101	82,443	70,713	+10,718
2007	16,727	17,036	82,103	65,324	+16,470
2008	16,751	17,091	85,859	84,108	+1,411
2009	16,779	17,188	86,879	84,411	+2,059
2010	17,377	17,060	87,538	75,668	+12,187
2011	17,125	17,060	93,466	81,231	+12,300
2012	17,706	17,012	94,346	79,335	+15,705
2013	18,137	17,258	96,782	84,823	+12,838
2014	19,039	16,780	91,594	78,218	+15,635
2015	19,768	17,565	110,070	90,072	+22,201

== Households ==
On 31 December 2016, there were 1,860,759 people registered as living in Hamburg in an area of 755.3 km^{2} (291.6 sq mi). The population density was 2,464/km^{2} (6,380/sq mi). The metropolitan area of the Hamburg region (Hamburg Metropolitan Region) is home to 5,107,429 living in an area of 26,000 km^{2} (10,000 sq mi) at a density of 196/km^{2} (510/sq mi).

There were 915,319 women and 945,440 men in Hamburg. For every 1,000 males, there were 1,033 females. In 2015, there were 19,768 births in Hamburg (of which 38.3% were to unmarried women); 6422 marriages and 3190 divorces, and 17,565 deaths. The age distribution was 16.1% under the age of 18, and 18.3% were 65 or older. 356 People in Hamburg were over the age of 100.

According to the Statistical Office of the State of Hamburg, the number of people with a migrant background is at 34% (631,246). Immigrants come from 180 countries. 5891 people have acquired German citizenship in 2016.

In 2016, there were 1,021,666 households, of which 17.8% had children under the age of 18; 54.4% of households were made up of singles. 25.6% of households with children were single parent households. The average household size was 1.8.

== Ethnic groups ==
In 2008 Hamburg had the highest Afghan diasporic population of any city in the continent, with 7,000 German citizens of Afghan origin and 14,000 other residents of Afghan origin. The city has therefore been nicknamed by some as Little Kabul. Immigration began with the start of the Soviet–Afghan War in 1979 and additional immigration came after its end. Due to the differing origins and political affiliations of the emigrés, Jochen-Martin Dutsch et al. wrote in Der Spiegel that "Hamburg's Afghan community was relatively loose-knit and was rarely perceived as an ethnic group, partly because these immigrants had been so deeply divided at home that there was little left to unite them as a community abroad." Therefore the residents focused internally on their own families and keeping them together. Afghan Museum was in Hamburg.

In 1963 there were 800 Japanese people in Hamburg, including 50 children. In 1985 the city had a Japanese community, though it was not the largest in Germany as by then Düsseldorf had the largest one. Japanese School in Hamburg is in nearby Halstenbek.

== See also ==
- Demographics of Berlin
- Demographics of Cologne
- Demographics of Munich

== Notes ==
a: The total figures for area and population are taken from the Wikipedia site.
b: The total figures for area and population include only European portions of transcontinental countries. The precision of these figure is compromised by the ambiguous geographical extend of Europe and the lack of references for European portions of transcontinental countries.
c: The total figures include the island Neuwerk and people living on ships.
d: Only liveborn without later correction.
