= Demographics of Munich =

This article describes the demographics of Munich via tables and graphs.

== Population growth ==
Population growth

The population of Munich was only 24,000 in 1700, but it doubled every 30 years, and in 1852 the population exceeded 100,000, qualifying it a large city (Großstadt) by German administrative standards. By 1883, Munich had a population of 250,000; this doubled to 500,000 in 1901, making Munich the third largest city in the German Empire after Berlin and Hamburg.

The physical effects of the Second World War are clearly visible. Towards the end of the war, 90% of the historical old town had been destroyed in 73 aerial raids and half of the city was in ruins. Estimates for the impact of these raids on the population offer the figure of 6,000 dead. In total, Munich lost 34% of its population, with 279,000 people displaced through evacuation, migration, deportation, and made homeless through aerial attacks. The total population decreased from 829,000 in May 1939 to 550,000 in May 1945. The prewar population level was not regained until 1950.

Shortly before the city's 800th anniversary, on 15 December 1957 at 15:45, the millionth resident of Munich, a Pasing boy named Thomas Helmut Seehaus was born, making Munich the latest city to reach a population of one million out of 70 cities worldwide. According to the Bavarian National Office for Statistics and Data Processing, the official figure for the population of Munich was 1,259,677 in December 2005 (only principal residences and with adjustments from other national offices). As of June 2007, it stood at 1,305,525.

The following summary shows the population according to historical local data. Up to 1824 the figures are mainly estimates; after that they are census results or official statistics from the local authorities. From 1871 onward, the figures given refer to the "population present in the town (ortsanwesende Bevölkerung); from 1925 the figures are the "resident population" (Wohnbevölkerung), and from since 1987 the figures are for the "population at the place of main residence" (Bevölkerung am Ort der Hauptwohnung). Before 1871, figures are from irregular survey methods.

=== From 1369 to 1944 ===
Date	Inhabitants
1369	10,810
1396	11,267
1440	9,488
1462	12,614
1500	13,447
1600	18,000
1630	20,000
1700	24,000
1722	29,097
1750	32,000
1771	31,000
1781	37,840
1794	34,277
1801	40,450
1810	40,638
1813	51,396

Date	Inhabitants	
1824	62,290	
1. June 1830	71,375	¹
3 December 1840	82.736	¹
3 December 1843	90.055	¹
3 December 1846	94,830	¹
3 December 1849	96,398	¹
3 December 1852	106,715	¹
3 December 1855	132,112	¹
3 December 1858	137,095	¹
3 December 1861	148,201	¹
3 December 1864	167,054	¹
3 December 1867	170,688	¹
1 December 1871	169,693	¹
1 December 1875	193,024	¹
1 December 1880	230,023	¹
1 December 1885	261,981	¹

Date	Inhabitants	
1 December 1890	349,024	¹
2 December 1895	407,307	¹
1 December 1900	499,959	¹
1 December 1905	509,067	¹
1 December 1910	596,467	¹
31 December 1913	640,000	
1 December 1916	594,096	¹
5 December 1917	595.002	¹
8 October 1919	630,711	¹
31 December 1920	666,000	
16 June 1925	680,704	¹
31 December 1930	728,900	
16 June 1933	735,388	¹
31 December 1935	743,653	
17 May 1939	829,318	¹
31 December 1940	834,500	

¹ Census figures

=== From 1945 to 1989 ===
Date	Inhabitants	
8 May 1945	550,000	
31 December 1945	674,154	
29 October 1946	751,967	¹
31 December 1947	788,100	
31 December 1948	801,500	
30 June 1949	814,228	
30 June 1950	823,892	
13 September 1950	831,937	¹
30 June 1951	855,003	
30. June 1952	873,065	
30. June 1953	889,843	
30. June 1954	908,572	
30 June 1955	929,808	
30 June 1956	957,177	
25 September 1956	962,860	¹
30 June 1957	986,028	
30 June 1958	1,011,878	

Date	Inhabitants	
30 June 1959	1,033,854	
30 June 1960	1,055,457	
6 June 1961	1,085,014	¹
31 December 1961	1,106,298	
31 December 1962	1,142,622	
31 December 1963	1,166,160	
31 December 1964	1,192,614	
31 December 1965	1,214,603	
31 December 1966	1,235,548	
31 December 1967	1,244,237	
31 December 1968	1,279,405	
31 December 1969	1,326,331	
27 May 1970	1,293,590	¹
31 December 1970	1,311,978	
31 December 1971	1,338,432	
31 December 1972	1,338,924	
31 December 1973	1,336,576	

Date	Inhabitants	
31 December 1974	1,323,434	
31 December 1975	1,314,865	
31 December 1976	1,314,572	
31 December 1977	1,313,939	
31 December 1978	1,296,970	
31 December 1979	1,299,693	
31 December 1980	1,298,941	
31 December 1981	1,291,828	
31 December 1982	1,287,080	
31 December 1983	1,283,457	
31 December 1984	1,267,451	
31 December 1985	1,266,549	
31 December 1986	1,274,716	
25 May 1987	1,185,421	¹
31 December 1987	1,201,479	
31 December 1988	1,211,617	
31 December 1989	1,206,683	

¹ Census figures

=== From 1990 ===
Date	Inhabitants
31 December 1990	1,229,026
31 December 1991	1,229,052
31 December 1992	1,256,638
31 December 1993	1,255,623
31 December 1994	1,244,676
31 December 1995	1,236,370
31 December 1996	1,225,809
31 December 1997	1,205,923
31 December 1998	1,188,897
31 December 1999	1,194,560

Date	Inhabitants
31 December 2000	1,210,223
31 December 2001	1,227,958
31 December 2002	1,234,692
31 December 2003	1,247,873
31 December 2004	1,249,176
31 December 2005	1,259,677
31 December 2006	1,294,608
31 December 2007	1.311.573
31 December 2008	1.326.807
31 December 2009	1.330.440

Date	Inhabitants	
31 December 2010	1.353.186	
9 May 2011	1.348.335	¹
31 December 2011	1.364.920	
31 December 2012	1.388.308	
31 December 2013	1.407.836	
31 December 2014	1.429.584	
31 December 2015	1.450.381	
30 June 2016	1.452.826	
31 December 2017	1.456.039	
31 December 2018	1.471.508	
31 December 2019	1.484.226	
31 December 2020	1.488.202	
31 December 2021	1.487.708	
31 December 2022	1.490.516	
31 December 2023	1.488.719	
31 December 2024	1.505.005	
31 December 2025	1.505.036	

¹ Census figures

Source: Bavarian Regional Authority for Statistics and Data Handling (Bayerisches Landesamt für Statistik und Datenverarbeitung).

== Population structure ==
In December 2005, the proportion of foreigners was 23.3% or 300,129 persons in absolute figures. The largest groups of these are Turks (43.309), Croatians (24,866), Serbians (24,439), Greeks (22,486), Austrians (21,411) and Italians (20,847). 37% of foreigners in Munich come from countries within the European Union.

Population	As of 31 December 2005
Legitimate Population	1,436,725
of which male	707,047
female	729,678
Inhabitants with principal residence	1,288,307
of which male	623,920
female	664,387
Inhabitants with secondary residence	148,418
of which male	83,127
female	65,291
Germans with principal residence	988,178
of which male	466,400
female	521,778
Foreigners with principal residence	300,129
of which male	157,520
female	142,609
Foreigner proportion in %	23.3

Source: Munich Statistical Office (Statistisches Amt der Landeshauptstadt München).

== Age distribution ==
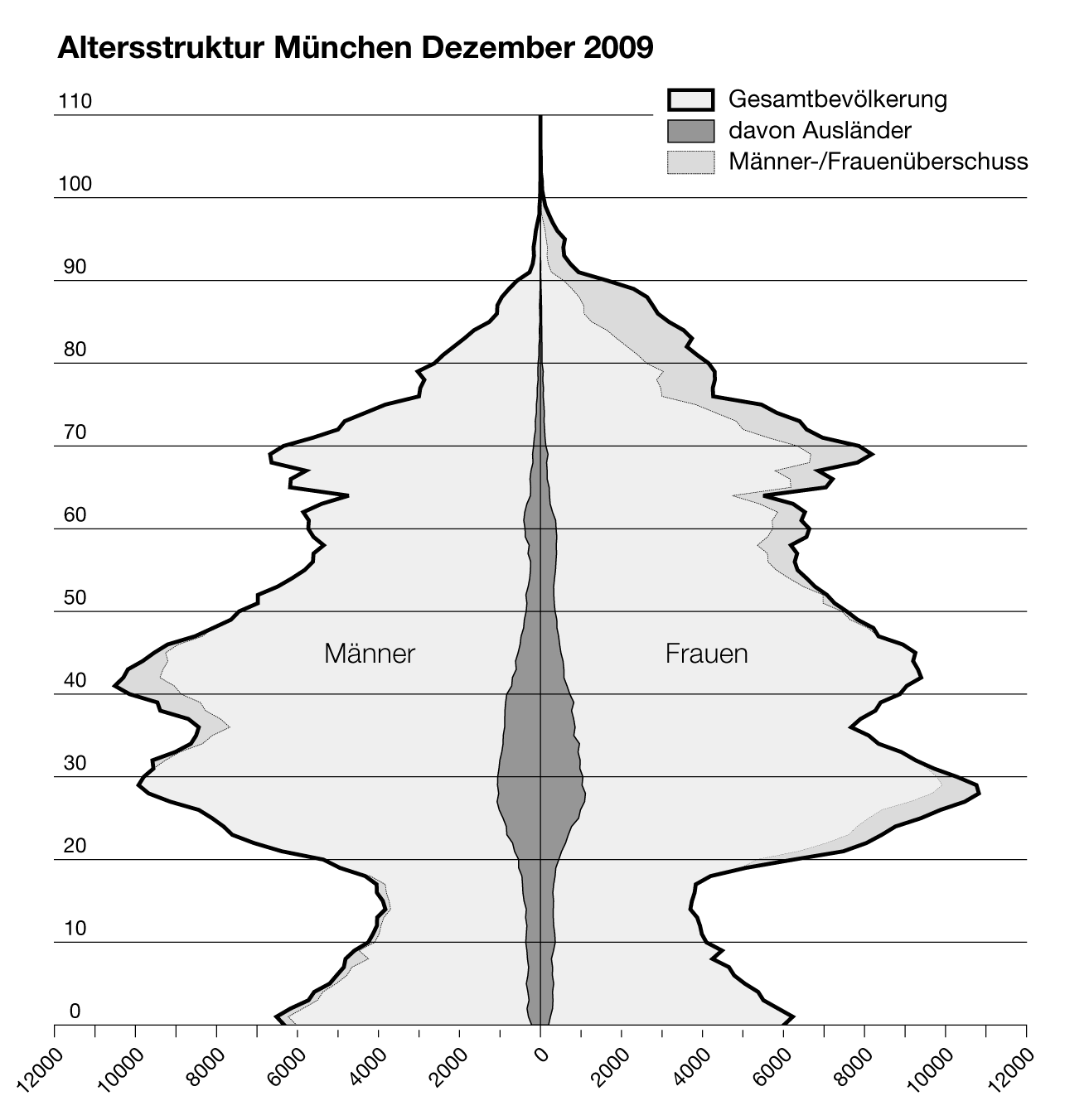
Population pyramid – age distribution in 2010

The following shows the age distribution from 31 December 2005 (principal residences).

Age from – to	Inhabitant Count	Proportion in %
0–5	68,853	5.3
6–14	88,518	6.9
15–44	575,131	44.6
45–64	330,516	25.7
over 65	225,289	17.5
Total	1,288,307	100.0

Source: Munich Statistical Office (Statistisches Amt der Landeshauptstadt München).

== Boroughs ==
The following number of inhabitants refer to principal residences as of 31 December 2006.

Name	Area in km^{2}	Inhabitant Count	Inhabitants per km^{2}
Allach-Untermenzing	15.45	27,730	1,795
Altstadt-Lehel	3.16	18,876	5,973
Aubing-Lochhausen-Langwied	34.06	37,857	1,111
Au-Haidhausen	4.22	54,382	12,887
Berg am Laim	6.31	39,009	6,182
Bogenhausen	23.71	75,657	3,191
Feldmoching-Hasenbergl	28.71	54,245	1,889
Hadern	9.23	44,993	4,875
Laim	5.29	50,082	9,457
Ludwigsvorstadt-Isarvorstadt	4.39	45,736	10,418
Maxvorstadt	4.29	46,058	10,736
Milbertshofen-Am Hart	13.37	66,992	5,011
Moosach	11.09	47,754	4,306
Neuhausen-Nymphenburg	12.92	84,604	6,548
Obergiesing	5.71	47,007	8,232
Pasing-Obermenzing	16.50	63,763	3,864
Ramersdorf-Perlach	19.90	102,689	5,160
Schwabing-Freimann	25.67	62,430	2,432
Schwabing-West	4.37	59,553	13,628
Schwanthalerhöhe	2.07	26,103	12,610
Sendling	3.94	37,146	9,428
Sendling-Westpark	7.81	50,903	6,518
Thalkirchen-Obersendling -Forstenried-Fürstenried-Solln	17.75	80,701	4,547
Trudering-Riem	22.45	53,915	2,401
Untergiesing-Harlaching	8.06	48,075	5,965
Munich	310.43	1,326,206	4,272

Source: Munich Statistical Office (Statistisches Amt der Landeshauptstadt München). (in German)

== Foreign communities ==
There are very sizable Balkan and Turkish communities in the city. Of the foreign nationals in Munich, about 37% come from the European Union.

Foreign residents by citizenship, 2023
Country	Population
Turkey	39,757
Croatia	36,934
Italy	28,723
Greece	24,684
Bosnia and Herzegovina	24,729
Ukraine	24,744
Austria	19,185
India	17,417
Romania	16,793
Poland	16,530
Serbia	14,869
Bulgaria	14,561
Kosovo	13,274
China	13,259
Russia	12,022
Spain	10,135
Afghanistan	10,128
France	10,088
Iraq	9,165
Hungary	7,014
United States	6,789
Vietnam	6,350
North Macedonia	4,633
Syria	4,545
Albania	4,106
Nigeria	3,648
United Kingdom	3,694
Portugal	3,472
Somalia	3,240

== See also ==
- History of Munich
- Mayors of Munich
- Demographics of Berlin
- Demographics of Cologne
- Demographics of Hamburg
- Demographics of Germany

== Literature ==
- Kaiserliches Statistisches Amt (Hrsg.): Statistisches Jahrbuch für das Deutsche Reich, 1880–1918 (in German)
- Statistisches Reichsamt (Hrsg.): Statistisches Jahrbuch für das Deutsche Reich, 1919–1941/42 (in German)
- Deutscher Städtetag (Hrsg.): Statistisches Jahrbuch Deutscher Gemeinden , 1890 ff. (in German)
- Statistisches Bundesamt (Hrsg.): Statistisches Jahrbuch für die Bundesrepublik Deutschland, 1952 ff. (in German)
