= Demographics of Cologne =

Cologne (German: Köln) is Germany's fourth-largest city and the largest city in the Rhineland. As of 31 December 2011, there were officially 1,017,155 residents. The city is center of the Cologne/Bonn Region with around 3 million inhabitants (including the neighboring cities of Bonn, Hürth, Leverkusen, and Bergisch Gladbach).

== Population by district ==
Districts of Cologne

District	Population					
	Population (1990)	Population (1995)	Population (2000)	Population (2005)	Population (2009)	Population (2025)^{estimated}
1. Innenstadt	137.283	138.637 ▲	133.454 ▼	129.496 ▼	126.301 ▼	128.400 ▲
2. Rodenkirchen	91.284	94.582 ▲	97.790 ▲	100.490 ▲	100.827 ▲	110.500 ▲
3. Lindenthal	134.823	135.276 ▲	139.026 ▲	139.803 ▲	137.870 ▼	145.300 ▲
4. Ehrenfeld	95.243	95.552 ▲	97.396 ▲	102.939 ▲	103.708 ▲	105.900 ▲
5. Nippes	111.133	109.481 ▼	108.206 ▼	109.235 ▲	111.141 ▲	111.000 ▼
6. Chorweiler	74.481	79.073 ▲	83.215 ▲	82.865 ▼	80.459 ▼	77.700 ▼
7. Porz	100.695	105.433 ▲	107.447 ▲	106.647 ▼	106.533 ▼	107.000 ▲
8. Kalk	108.769	108.185 ▼	106.377 ▼	107.194 ▲	109.045 ▲	105.800 ▼
9. Mülheim	142.889	141.877 ▼	144.321 ▲	144.432 ▲	144.419 ▼	140.300 ▼
Cologne	998.590 ▼	1.008.848 ▲	1.017.721 ▲	1.023.101 ▲	1.020.303 ▼	1.031.800 ▲
source: Die Kölner Stadtteile in Zahlen 2010 (in German)

== Population by migration background ==
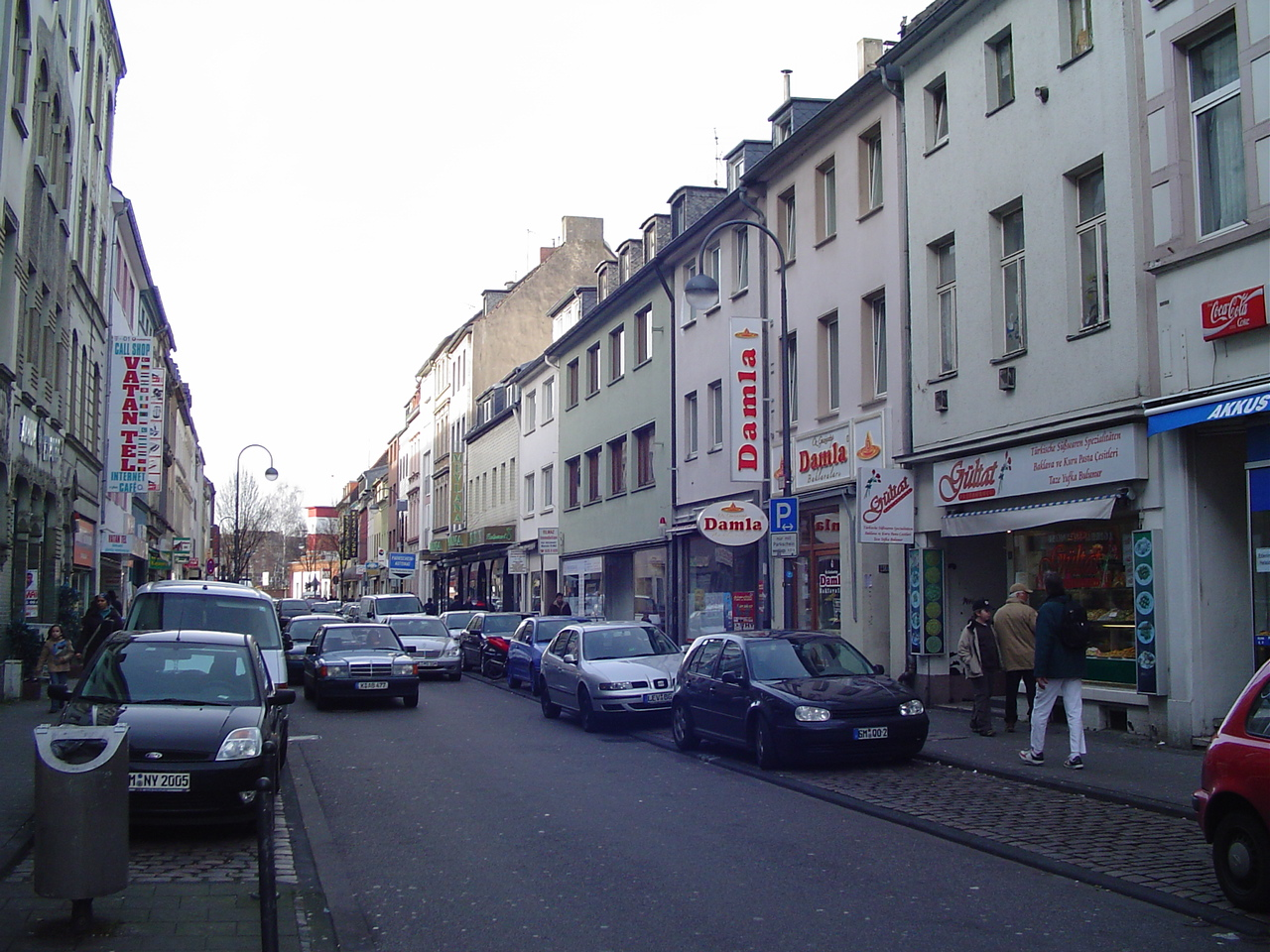
Keupstraße in the district of Mülheim is a centre of the Turkish community in Cologne.

District	Population (2009)	German citizens			Foreign citizens							
		(total)	German citizens w/o migration backgr.	German citizens w/ migration backgr.	(total)	from inside the EU^{1}	from Turkey	from elsewhere in Europe	from Africa^{2}	from the Americas	from Asia^{3}	from elsewhere
1. Innenstadt	126.301	104.945	92.946	11.999	21.356	9.524	4.502	2.532	924	1.287	2.460	127
2. Rodenkirchen	100.827	86.823	74.938	11.885	14.004	5.717	3.298	1.850	827	505	1.747	60
3. Lindenthal	137.870	124.943	111.586	13.357	12.927	6.034	1.600	1.646	627	762	2.146	112
4. Ehrenfeld	103.708	83.614	69.749	13.865	20.094	6.824	7.960	2.394	970	459	1.367	120
5. Nippes	111.141	91.048	77.230	13.818	20.093	5.876	9.584	2.131	857	409	1.146	90
6. Chorweiler	80.459	65.770	46.806	18.964	14.689	3.216	6.989	2.589	456	96	1.252	91
7. Porz	106.533	91.368	71.409	19.959	15.165	4.802	4.412	3.178	653	196	1.850	75
8. Kalk	109.045	82.012	61.387	20.625	27.033	6.867	10.865	4.287	1.772	280	1.772	108
9. Mülheim	144.419	116.935	93.804	23.131	27.484	6.642	12.480	3.885	1.750	443	2.202	82
Cologne	1.020.303	847.458	699.855	147.603	172.845	55.502	61.690	24.492	8.835	4.437	17.024	865

^{1} largest groups from Italy, Poland and Greece
^{2} largest groups from Morocco and Algeria
^{3} largest group from Iran

== Population by age ==
District	Population (2004)				
	Population (total)	Population age < 18	Population age 18 < 35	Population age 35 < 65	Population age > 65
1. Innenstadt	129.047 ▼	12.091 ▼			
2. Rodenkirchen	100.325 ▼	15.828 ▲			
3. Lindenthal	139.233 ▲	17.700 ▲			
4. Ehrenfeld	102.264 ▲	16.780 ▼			
5. Nippes	109.009 ▲	17.172 ▲			
6. Chorweiler	83.332 ▼	17.979 ▼			
7. Porz	107.437 ▼	19.180 ▼			
8. Kalk	107.036 ▲	19.246 ▼			
9. Mülheim	144.944 ▲	26.229 ▼			
Cologne	1.022.627 ▲	162.205 ▼	257.218 ▼		
source: Statistisches Jahrbuch Köln 2004 (in German)

District	Population (2006)				
	Population (total)	Population age < 18	Population age 18 < 35	Population age 35 < 65	Population age > 65
1. Innenstadt	129.318 ▲	11.660 ▼	44.706	54.820	18.132
2. Rodenkirchen	101.309 ▲	15.760 ▼	21.461	44.631	19.457
3. Lindenthal	139.507 ▲	17.668 ▼	37.927	59.504	24.408
4. Ehrenfeld	103.205 ▲	16.522 ▼	28.472	42.404	15.807
5. Nippes	109.413 ▲	17.136 ▼	25.194	46.766	20.317
6. Chorweiler	82.161 ▼	17.042 ▼	16.548	34.358	14.213
7. Porz	106.567 ▼	18.566 ▼	21.325	46.803	19.873
8. Kalk	108.146 ▲	19.205 ▼	26.351	42.844	19.746
9. Mülheim	144.720 ▼	25.589 ▼	32.871	59.631	26.629
Cologne	1.024.346 ▲	159.148 ▼	254.855 ▼	431.761	178.582
source: Bevölkerungsprognose Kölner Stadtteile 2006/2025 (in German)

District	Population (2009)				
	Population (total)	Population age < 18	Population age 18 < 35	Population age 35 < 65	Population age > 65
1. Innenstadt	126.301 ▼	11.254 ▼			18.139 ▲
2. Rodenkirchen	100.827 ▲	15.946 ▲			20.332 ▲
3. Lindenthal	137.870 ▼	18.693 ▲			25.302 ▲
4. Ehrenfeld	103.708 ▲	16.065 ▼			16.163 ▲
5. Nippes	111.141 ▲	17.246 ▲			20.650 ▲
6. Chorweiler	80.459 ▼	15.798 ▼			14.947 ▲
7. Porz	106.533 ▼	18.011 ▼			21.112 ▲
8. Kalk	109.045 ▲	19.415 ▲			20.029 ▲
9. Mülheim	144.419 ▼	25.152 ▼			26.793 ▲
Cologne	1.020.303 ▼	157.580 ▼	253.964 ▼	425.292 ▼	183.467 ▲
source: Die Kölner Stadtteile in Zahlen 2010 (in German)

== Historic population data ==
=== Roman Cologne ===
The walls of Colonia Agrippina covered an area of 96.8 hectares, but the population density within the walls remains uncertain.

Date	Population
50	30.000
150	50.000
250	15.000
350	15.000

=== Medieval Cologne ===
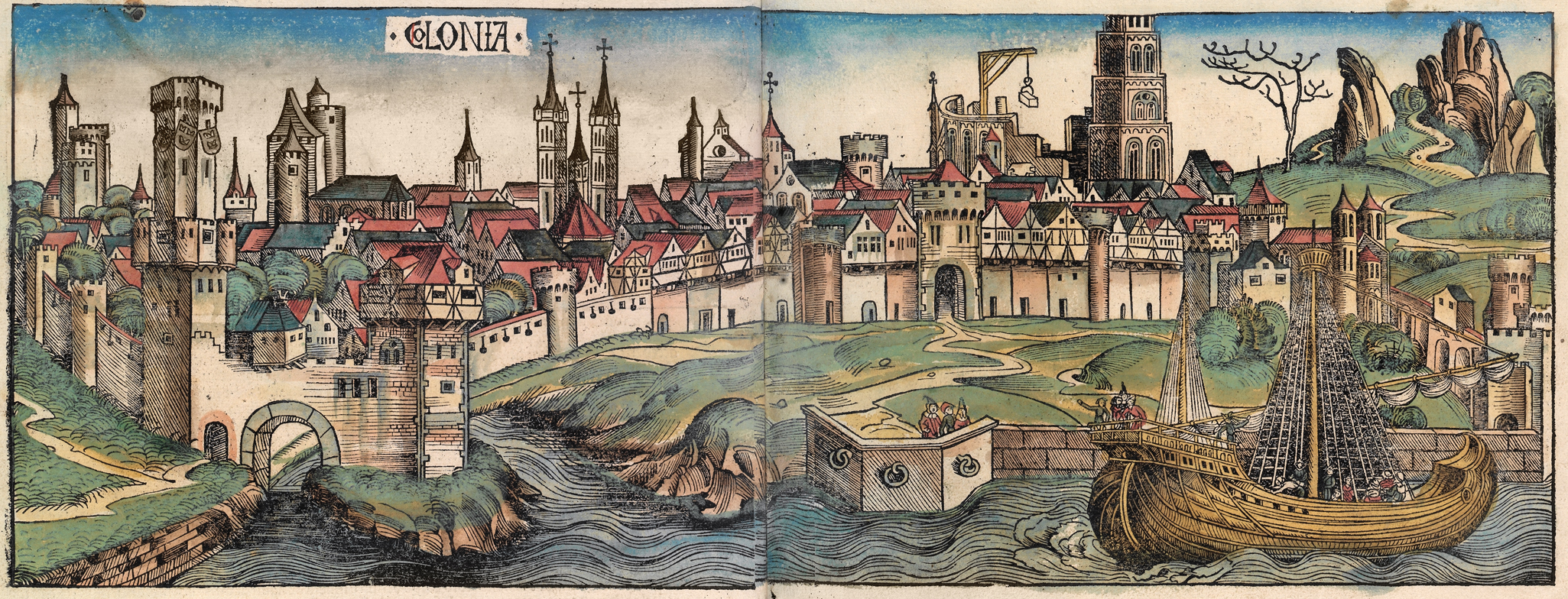
Woodcut of Cologne from the Nuremberg Chronicle, 1493

Since the construction of the Medieval wall in 1180, the area of the old imperial city of Cologne has not changed for more than 600 years and was only extended over the old city walls in 1794, just short before the arrival of French troops and Cologne's incorporation into the First French Empire.

Date	Population
900	
1000	
1140	20.000
1180	40.000
1200	

Date	Population
1300	
1400	
1430	40.000
1500	

=== Modern Cologne ===
==== 16th through 19th century ====
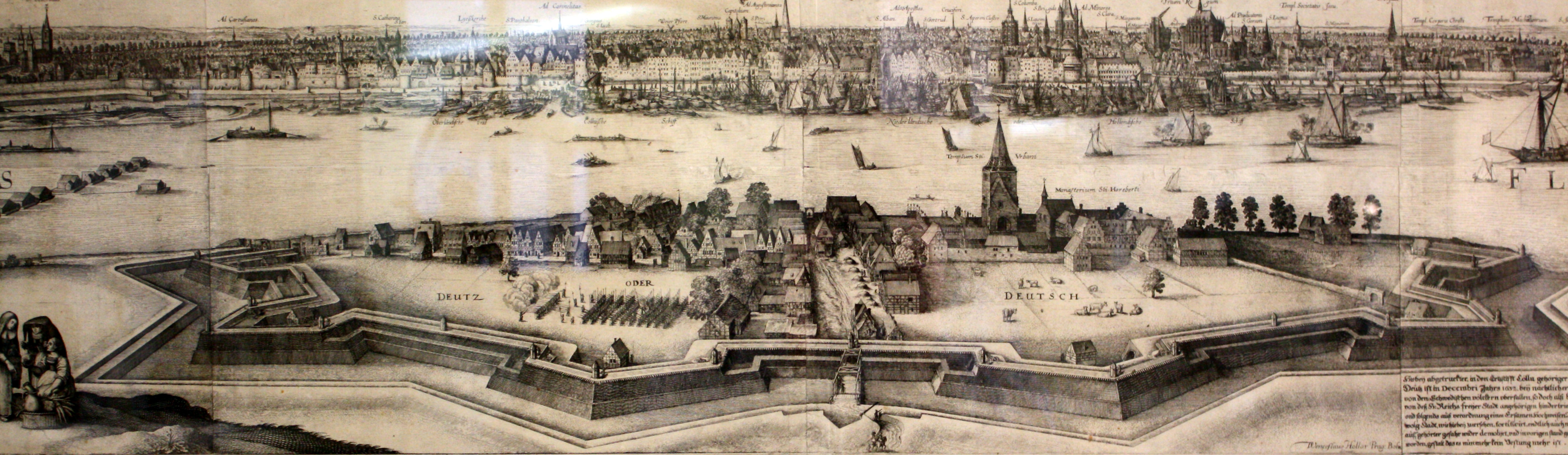
Copper engraving of Cologne by Hollar von Prachna, Wenceslaus, 1636

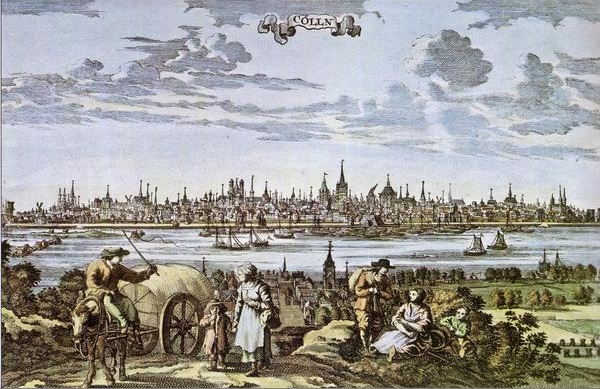
Coloured drawing of Cologne, ca. 1700

After 1815, the Kingdom of Prussia enforced the construction of fortifications which again hindered any growth for the city. Only with the acquisition of these fortifications in 1881, the city of Cologne had the possibility of a gradual territorial expansion. On 12. November 1883 a strip of territory from parts of the municipalities of Ehrenfeld, Kriel, Longerich, Müngersdorf and Rondorf was added to the city. Since 1886, the Cologne City Council intensified negotiations with the surrounding communities, and on 1 April 1888 ended in a first major incorporation.

Date	Population
1501	
1600	40.000
1670	37.000
1700	39.000

Date	Population
1701	
1714	42.015
1735	44.568
1794	44.512
1800	

Date	Population
1801	42.024 ▼
1810	45.029 ▲
1. December 1816 ¹	49.276 ▲
1. December 1819 ¹	55.355 ▲
1. December 1822 ¹	56.527 ▲
1. December 1825 ¹	59.049 ▲
1. December 1828 ¹	61.059 ▲
1. December 1831 ¹	65.953 ▲
3. December 1834 ¹	67.302 ▲
3. December 1837 ¹	72.237 ▲
3. December 1840 ¹	75.858 ▲
3. December 1843 ¹	83.418 ▲
3. December 1849 ¹	94.789 ▲
3. December 1850	95.500 ▲

Date	Population
3. December 1851	
3. December 1852 ¹	101.091 ▲
3. December 1855 ¹	106.852 ▲
3. December 1858 ¹	114.477 ▲
3. December 1861 ¹	120.568 ▲
3. December 1864 ¹	122.162 ▲
3. December 1867 ¹	125.172 ▲
1. December 1871 ¹	129.233 ▲
1. December 1875 ¹	135.371 ▲
1. December 1880 ¹	144.772 ▲
1. December 1885 ¹	161.401 ▲
1. December 1890 ¹	281.681 ▲
2. December 1895 ¹	321.564 ▲
1. December 1900 ¹	372.229 ▲

==== 20th century ====
The territorial expansion, beginning in the late 19th century, were significant marks for the city's population growth. Major communal reorganizations took place in 1910, 1914, 1922 and 1975.

Date	Population
31. December 1901	380.518 ▲
31. December 1902	392.882 ▲
31. December 1903	406.420 ▲
31. December 1904	417.480 ▲
1. December 1905 ¹	428.722 ▲
31. December 1906	440.376 ▲
31. December 1907	451.134 ▲
31. December 1908	461.891 ▲
31. December 1909	472.649 ▲
1. December 1910 ¹	516.527 ▲
31. December 1911	525.671 ▲
31. December 1912	538.302 ▲
31. December 1913	550.540 ▲
31. December 1914	642.848 ▲
31. December 1915	
1. December 1916 ¹	595.853 ▼
5. December 1917 ¹	609.244 ▲
31. December 1918	
31. December 1919	644.206 ▲
31. December 1920	657.175 ▲

Date	Population
31. December 1921	665.629 ▲
31. December 1922	683.363 ▲
31. December 1923	690.605 ▲
31. December 1924	696.168 ▲
31. December 1925	705.477 ▲
31. December 1926	713.633 ▲
31. December 1927	723.753 ▲
31. December 1928	733.075 ▲
31. December 1929	736.914 ▲
31. December 1930	740.082 ▲
31. December 1931	739.726 ▼
31. December 1932	741.283 ▲
31. December 1933	759.648 ▲
31. December 1934	760.422 ▲
31. December 1935	761.263 ▲
31. December 1936	762.154 ▲
31. December 1937	765.468 ▲
31. December 1938	767.102 ▲
31. December 1939	767.222 ▲
December 1940	733.500 ▼

Date	Population
December 1941	690.000 ▼
December 1942	648.200 ▼
December 1943	561.600 ▼
December 1944	472.900 ▼
31. December 1945	453.566 ▼
31. December 1946	494.815 ▲
31. December 1947	515.355 ▲
31. December 1948	543.765 ▲
31. December 1949	573.557 ▲
31. December 1950	603.283 ▲
31. December 1951	630.232 ▲
31. December 1952	647.540 ▲
31. December 1953	670.031 ▲
31. December 1954	688.765 ▲
31. December 1955	712.561 ▲
31. December 1956	718.722 ▲
31. December 1957	737.991 ▲
31. December 1958	756.203 ▲
31. December 1959	773.280 ▲
31. December 1960	803.616 ▲

Date	Population
31. December 1961	816.542 ▲
31. December 1962	827.659 ▲
31. December 1963	835.832 ▲
31. December 1964	842.061 ▲
31. December 1965	854.479 ▲
31. December 1966	860.200 ▲
31. December 1967	854.717 ▼
31. December 1968	855.886 ▲
31. December 1969	864.754 ▲
31. December 1970	847.037 ▼
31. December 1971	846.479 ▼
31. December 1972	841.537 ▼
31. December 1973	832.396 ▼
31. December 1974	825.792 ▼
31. December 1975	1.013.771 ▲
31. December 1976	981.021 ▼
31. December 1977	976.761 ▼
31. December 1978	976.534 ▼
31. December 1979	976.136 ▼
31. December 1980	976.694 ▲

Date	Population
31. December 1981	971.403 ▼
31. December 1982	961.777 ▼
31. December 1983	940.663 ▼
31. December 1984	922.286 ▼
31. December 1985	916.153 ▼
31. December 1986	914.336 ▼
31. December 1987	930.907 ▲
31. December 1988	937.482 ▲
31. December 1989	946.280 ▲
31. December 1990	953.551 ▲
31. December 1991	956.690 ▲
31. December 1992	960.631 ▲
31. December 1993	962.517 ▲
31. December 1994	963.817 ▲
31. December 1995	965.697 ▲
31. December 1996	964.346 ▼
31. December 1997	964.311 ▼
31. December 1998	962.580 ▼
31. December 1999	962.507 ▼
31. December 2000	962.884 ▲

==== 21st century ====
Date	Population
31. December 2001	967.940 ▲
31. December 2002	968.639 ▲
31. December 2003	965.954 ▼
31. December 2004	969.709 ▲
31. December 2005	983.347 ▲
31. December 2006	989.766 ▲
31. December 2007	995.397 ▲
31. December 2008	995.420 ▲
31. December 2009	998.105 ▲
31. December 2010	1.007.119 ▲

Date	Population
31. December 2011	1.013.665 ▲
31. December 2012	1.024.373 ▲
31. December 2013	1.034.175 ▲
31. December 2014	1.046.680 ▲
31. December 2015	1.060.582 ▲

== See also ==
- Demographics of the European Union
- Demographics of Germany
- Demographics of Berlin
- Demographics of Hamburg
- Demographics of Munich
