= Mustapha Amari =

German footballer

Personal information
- Date of birth: February 25, 1994 (age 32)
- Place of birth: Lößnitz, Germany
- Position: Attacking midfielder

Team information
- Current team: VfL Halle
- Number: 5

Youth career
- –2012: Erzgebirge Aue
- 2012–2013: Hallescher FC

Senior career*
Years	Team	Apps	(Gls)
2013–2014	Hallescher FC II	31	(14)
2013–2014	Hallescher FC	2	(0)
2014–	VfL Halle	21	(6)
- * Club domestic league appearances and goals as of 1 October 2015

Mustapha Amari (born February 25, 1994) is a German footballer who plays as a midfielder for VfL Halle.

== Career ==
Amari signed for Hallescher FC in 2012, having been in Erzgebirge Aue's youth team and made his 3. Liga debut in December 2013, as a substitute for Anton Müller in a 1–0 defeat to Wacker Burghausen.
