= Rachid El Hammouchi =

Moroccan-German footballer

Personal information
- Date of birth: 12 September 1981 (age 45)
- Place of birth: Mülheim (Ruhr), West Germany
- Height: 1.76 m (5 ft 9 in)
- Positions: Defensive midfielder; right-back

Senior career*
Years	Team	Apps	(Gls)
2000–2002	Alemannia Aachen II		
2002–2003	Greuther Fürth II	27	(1)
2003–2006	Alemannia Aachen II	92	(6)
2006–2008	Fortuna Sittard	69	(3)
2008–2009	Kickers Emden	37	(0)
2009–2010	SV Wilhelmshaven	27	(1)
2010–2013	Wuppertaler SV	89	(1)
2013–2014	Wormatia Worms	28	(0)
2014–2015	Borussia Freialdenhoven	20	(1)
2014–2015	TSV Hertha Walheim	20	(1)
- * Club domestic league appearances and goals

Rachid El Hammouchi (born 12 September 1981) is a Moroccan-German former professional footballer who played as a defensive midfielder or right-back. He played in the 3. Liga for Kickers Emden.
