= Yassin Ibrahim =

German footballer (born 2000)

Personal information
- Date of birth: 9 February 2000 (age 26)
- Place of birth: Münster, Germany
- Height: 1.77 m (5 ft 10 in)
- Position: Winger

Team information
- Current team: SV Rödinghausen
- Number: 23

Youth career
- FC Gievenbeck
- –2013: Preußen Münster
- 2013–2019: Borussia Dortmund

Senior career*
Years	Team	Apps	(Gls)
2019–2020	Würzburger Kickers	5	(0)
2020–	SV Rödinghausen	57	(13)

International career^{‡}
2017	Germany U18	1	(0)
- * Club domestic league appearances and goals as of 13:26, 7 January 2023 (UTC) ‡ National team caps and goals as of 23:38, 1 August 2019 (UTC)

Yassin Ibrahim (born 9 February 2000) is a German footballer who plays as a winger for Regionalliga West club SV Rödinghausen.

== Career ==
Ibrahim made his professional debut for Würzburger Kickers in the 3. Liga on 20 July 2019, coming on as a substitute in the 79th minute for Dominik Widemann in the 3–1 home win against Bayern Munich II.

== Personal life ==
Ibrahim was born in Münster, North Rhine-Westphalia and is of Sudanese descent.
