= Khalid al-Maaly =

- Born: April 15, 1956 (age 69); As-Samawah, Iraq
- Occupations: Writer and Poet

Khalid al-Maaly (Arabic: خالد المعالي; born April 15, 1956) is a leading Arab writer, poet and publisher.
