= Turks in Berlin =

Ethnic group in Berlin, Germany

Turkish community of Berlin
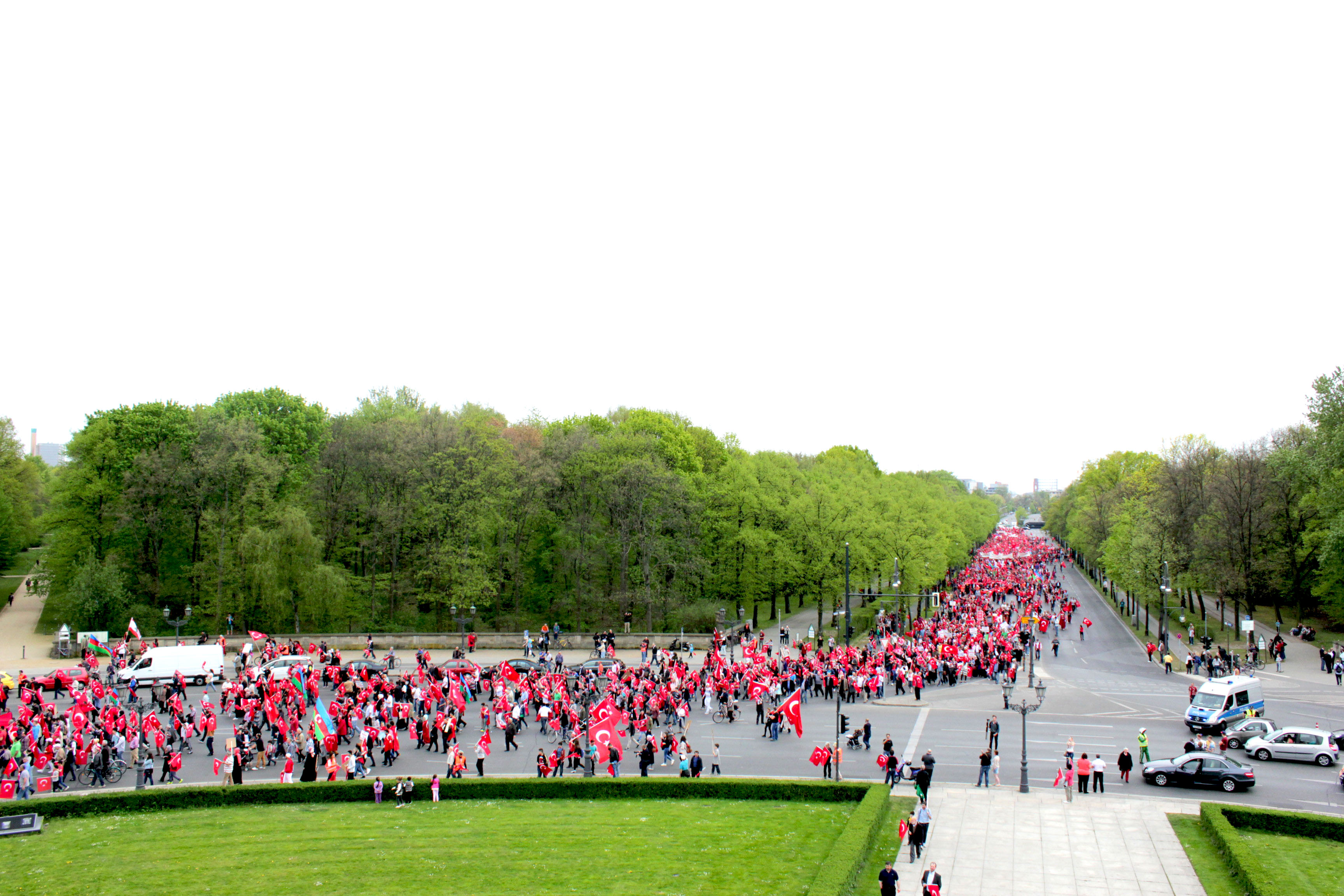
- A Turkish protest in Berlin

Total population
- Estimates vary because the official German census does not collect data on ethnicity. German statistics: 191.397 (2023)

Regions with significant populations
- Berlin; Kreuzberg, Neukölln, Schöneberg, Gesundbrunnen, Moabit, Hansaviertel

Languages
- German · Turkish

Religion
- Sunni Islam; Alevism; other religions; irreligious

Turks in Berlin (Turkish: Berlin'deki Türkler) are people of Turkish ethnicity living in Berlin where they form the largest ethnic minority group, and the largest Turkish community outside Turkey. The largest communities can be found in Kreuzberg, Neukölln, and Wedding, with substantial populations in other areas, almost exclusively those of the former West Berlin.

== Demographics ==
=== Official statistics ===
German statistics do not provide a true reflection on the ethnic Turkish community in Berlin because censuses only collect data on the country of birth of one's parents rather than ethnicity. In 2016 there were 97,682 foreign nationals with Turkish citizenship registered as residents in Berlin. Additionally, there were 79,048 German citizens with a Turkish "migration background" (meaning they or their parents had immigrated to Germany after 1955). However, these figures do not take into account the third, fourth, or fifth generation Turkish-Germans who are recorded as "Germans".

Furthermore, German statistics do not include the significant migration waves of ethnic Turkish communities which have come to Berlin from other post-Ottoman modern nation-states, especially from the Balkans (e.g. Bulgarian Turks and Western Thrace Turks), from the island of Cyprus (i.e. Turkish Cypriots from both the Republic of Cyprus and Northern Cyprus), the Levant (especially Iraqi Turks, Lebanese Turks, and Syrian Turks), etc. These ethnic Turkish communities are recorded according to their citizenship, such as "Bulgarian", "Cypriot", "Greek", "Iraqi", "Lebanese" "Macedonian", "Syrian" etc., or German (if they have acquired German citizenship), rather than by their Turkish ethnicity.

=== "Turkish towns" ===
Due to its large Turkish population, Kreuzberg has been dubbed a so-called "Turkish town" by observers such as John Ardagh.

== See also ==
- Turks in Germany
- Ernst Reuter
- Turks in the United Kingdom
  - Turks in London
