= Demographics of Berlin =

- Population pyramid of Berlin in 2022
- Population: 3,700,577 (2025)

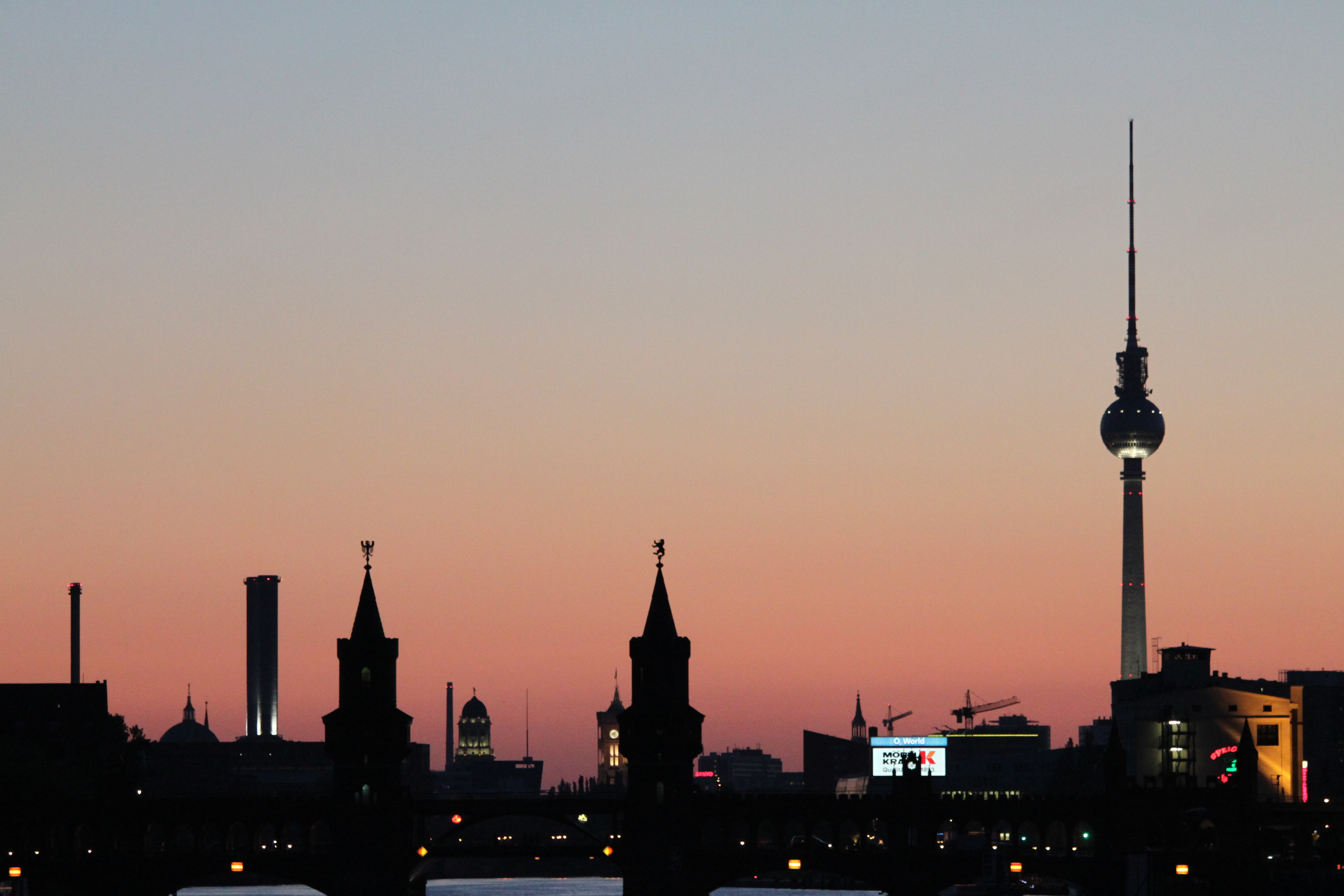
Urbanized Berlin

As of 31 December 2025, Berlin had 3,700,577 inhabitants, making it Germany's most populous city and the most populous city proper in the European Union. Foreign nationals numbered 833,213, accounting for 22.5% of all inhabitants. Recent population growth has been driven primarily by migration.

== History ==
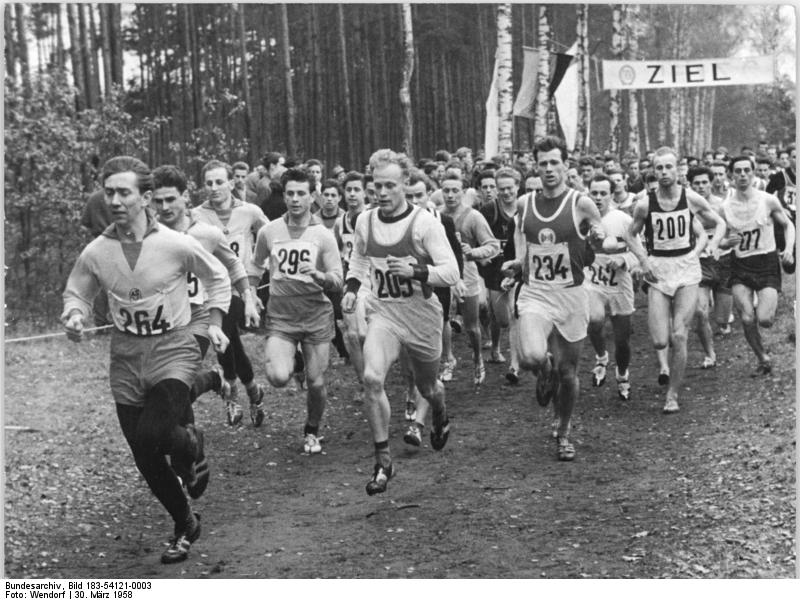
People running in 1958

Population pyramid of Berlin in 1946

The city responded to the 1685 revocation of the Edict of Nantes in France with the Edict of Potsdam, which guaranteed religious freedom and tax-free status to French Huguenot refugees for ten years. Thanks to its role as the capital of rising Prussia, the population grew steadily: it surpassed the 100,000 mark in 1747 and the one-million mark in 1877.

Growth accelerated in the 19th century with the industrialisation after the Napoleonic Wars and the Prussian Reforms. Only about 40% of Berliners in the last quarter of the 19th century were natives of the city. Nevertheless, Berlin's population remained ethnically and even regionally very homogeneous: In 1895, over 98% of inhabitants spoke German as their native language. Among the rest were 12,000 Polish speakers, 700 Russophones and about 2,000 other Slavs. In 1900, most of the 1.9 million Berliners originated from the eastern provinces of Prussia. A fifth hailed from the surrounding province of Brandenburg, 9% from the provinces of West and East Prussia, 7% from Silesia, 6% from Pomerania, 5% from Posen, 4% from Saxony. Only about 3 to 4% had come to the city from other German regions and only about 1.5% from abroad, mostly from Austria-Hungary and the Russian Empire.

Between 1913 and 1917, the population fell by about 16% down to 1.744 million people, mostly due to men serving in World War I, but recovered somewhat after the armistice, reaching 1.928 million people in December 1919. In December 1917, during the latter part of the war, there were 58,152 military personnel and 4,017 prisoners-of-war in the city.

=== Greater Berlin and interwar growth ===
The industrialisation had brought about a rapid expansion of the suburbs, many of them developed explicitly for workers of specific factories, e.g. Siemensstadt and Borsigwalde. The Greater Berlin Act of 1920 (Groß-Berlin-Gesetz) boosted the population by incorporating many hitherto autonomous towns and cities, e.g. Spandau and Köpenick at the margins of the modern metropolis, but also Charlottenburg, nowadays almost in the heart of the city. The city approximately reached its modern extent, growing from 66 km^{2} (25 sq mi) to 883 km^{2} (341 sq mi). This expansion made Berlin the most populous city proper of Continental Europe in the interwar period (though not the largest agglomeration) and the third-largest in the world behind London and New York. The four-million mark was surpassed in the 1920s.

=== Nazi rule and World War II ===
During the 1930s, Berlin's population remained relatively stable. The 1939 census recorded around 4.33 million inhabitants, making it the last major population count before the outbreak of the Second World War. The city's demographic composition was also transformed by Nazi persecution. Berlin's Jewish population, which numbered around 160,000 people in 1933, declined sharply as many emigrated and others were later deported.

In 1942, the officially registered population reached its maximum of 4.48 million, although because of the war conditions, this was an overestimation. More likely estimates based on food rationing data show lower numbers of 3.95 million people in February 1942 and only 3.11 million people in February 1944 (incl. 177,000 foreigners) when aerial attacks approached its most intense phase.

=== Post-war division and migration ===
In the context of the more general huge population movements in immediately post-war Germany, a significant part of Berlin's pre-war population permanently resettled to other parts of Germany or abroad. A 1946 census counted 436,600 Berliners in the western occupation zones and 306,823 in the Soviet zone. In 1950, this number had risen to 518,218 in what had now become the Federal Republic. Since the end of World War II, the city population has been fluctuating between 3 and 3.5 million, with a low of less than 3.1 million from the mid-1970s to mid-1980s. Between 1950 and 1961, so between the establishment of the Soviet-backed German Democratic Republic and the construction of the Berlin Wall, most of the losses were incurred by East Berlin, while West Berlin showed modest growth of 2.3%.

Moving to West Berlin was attractive for those from West Germany who wished to avoid the draft from 1957 to 1990, because the special administrative status of the city meant that the draft could not be enforced there.

From the late 1960s, West Berlin experienced substantial labour migration, particularly from Turkey. By 1971, around 50,000 people of Turkish origin lived in West Berlin, rising to almost 120,000 by 1981. Many migrant workers subsequently settled permanently, while family reunification contributed to the growth of immigrant communities. Turkish settlement became concentrated in several inner-city districts, including Kreuzberg, Neukölln and Wedding. Berlin has been described as having the largest Turkish community outside Turkey.

East Berlin also received contract workers from other socialist states through the GDR's state-organised labour migration programmes. Workers from Vietnam became the largest group of contract workers in the GDR and were employed in considerable numbers in East Berlin.

=== Migration after reunification ===
Following German reunification, Berlin received substantial numbers of Aussiedler and Spätaussiedler, particularly ethnic German resettlers and their family members from the former Soviet Union. From 1993, new arrivals in this category were officially designated Spätaussiedler. Migration from the former Soviet Union also included Jewish immigrants and their relatives.

Berlin also received substantial numbers of refugees from the Yugoslav Wars, particularly from Bosnia and Herzegovina. In 1996, around 32,000 Bosnian war refugees were recorded in Berlin.

Berlin experienced another major migration wave during the European refugee crisis of 2015–2016. Over the two years, Berlin recorded a combined net migration gain from abroad of around 93,700 people, largely driven by the arrival of asylum seekers. The largest net inflows during these two years were those from Syria (25,600), Afghanistan (8,100) and Iraq (6,600). The rapid increase in arrivals exceeded existing accommodation capacity, leading to the conversion of sports halls and other buildings, including the hangars of the former Tempelhof Airport, into emergency shelters.

The migration wave also contributed to Berlin's development as an important centre of Arab cultural and intellectual life in Europe.

The 2022 Russian invasion of Ukraine triggered another major migration wave to Berlin. About 50,000 Ukrainian refugees moved to the city in 2022 alone. Migration from Ukraine continued in subsequent years, although at lower levels. By the end of 2025, 61,885 Ukrainian citizens lived in Berlin, making them the city's second-largest foreign citizenship group after Turkish citizens.

According to estimates by the state government, Berlin's population is expected to grow to 4.006.000 inhabitants in the year 2040. The expected growth is entirely the result of domestic and international migration as deaths are forecast to exceed live births.

=== Statistics ===
Chart showing Berlin's population fluctuations since 1880. The spike in population in 1920 is a result of the Greater Berlin Act.

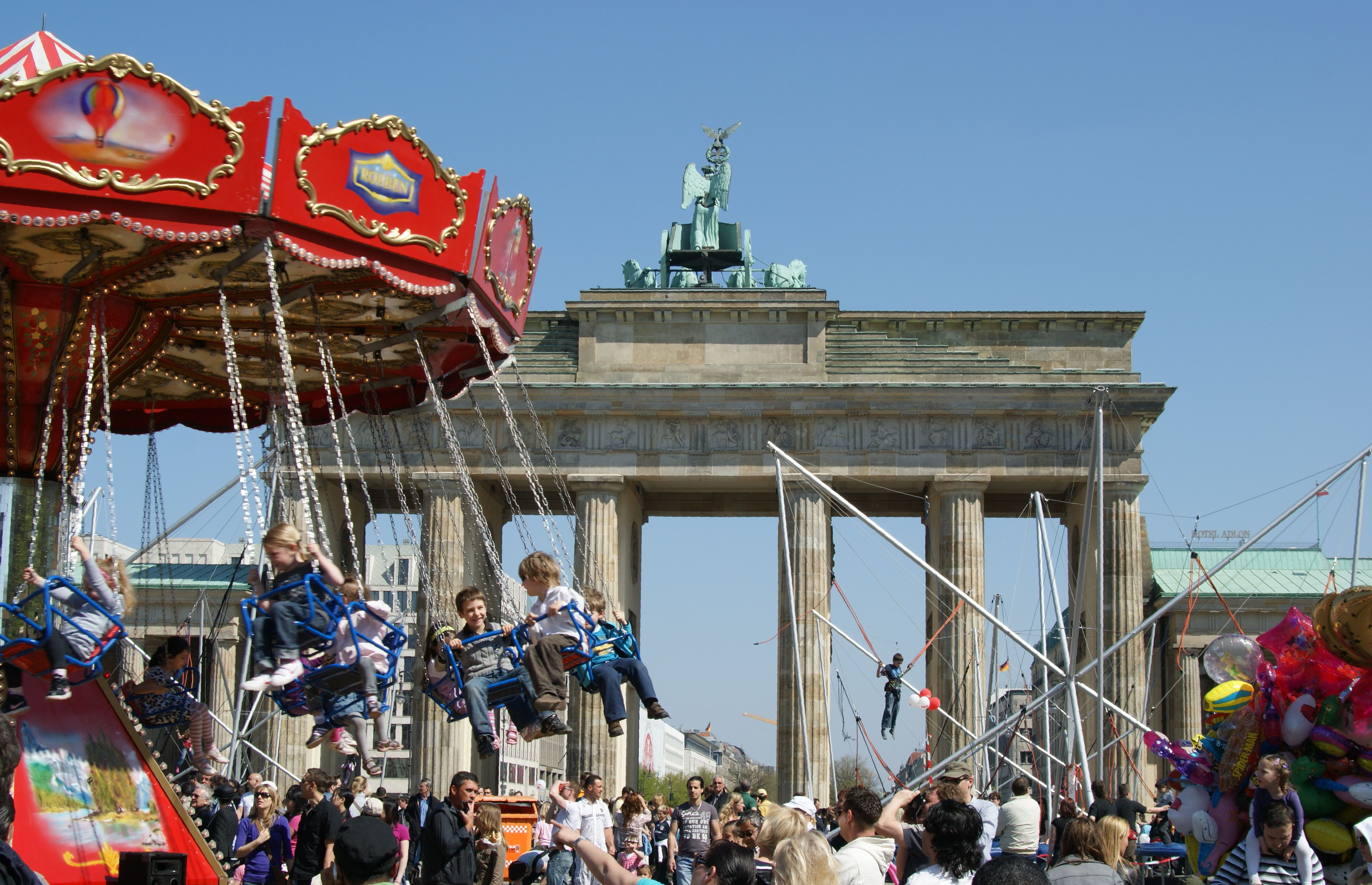
Children in a fair in front of the Brandenburg Gate

Year	Population
1250	1,200
1307	7,000
1400	8,500
1576	12,000
1600	9,000
1631	8,100
1648	6,000
1654	6,197
1685	17,500
1690	21,500
1698	22,400
1700	29,000
1709	55,000
1712	61,000
1750	113,289
1775	136,137
1800	172,132
1825	219,968
December 3, 1840 ¹	322,626
December 3, 1846 ¹	408,500
December 3, 1849 ¹	418,733

Year	Population
December 3, 1852 ¹	426,600
December 3, 1855 ¹	442,500
December 3, 1858 ¹	463,600
December 3, 1861 ¹	524,900
December 3, 1864 ¹	632,700
December 3, 1867 ¹	702,400
December 1, 1871 ¹	826,341
December 1, 1875 ¹	969,050
December 1, 1880 ¹	1,122,330
December 1, 1885 ¹	1,315,287
December 1, 1890 ¹	1,578,794
December 2, 1895 ¹	1,678,924
December 1, 1900 ¹	1,888,848
December 1, 1905 ¹	2,042,402
December 1, 1910 ¹	2,071,257
December 1, 1916 ¹	1,712,679

Year	Population
December 5, 1917 ¹	1,681,916
October 8, 1919 ¹	1,902,509
June 16, 1925 ¹	4,024,286
June 16, 1933 ¹	4,242,501
May 17, 1939 ¹	4,338,756
August 12, 1945 ¹	2,807,405
October 29, 1946 ¹	3,170,832
December 31, 1950	3,336,026
December 31, 1960	3,274,016
December 31, 1970	3,208,719
December 31, 1980	3,048,759
December 31, 1990	3,433,695
December 31, 2000	3,382,169
September 30, 2005	3,394,000
December 31, 2010	3,460,725
December 31, 2013	3,517,424
December 31, 2016	3,670,622

== City size ==
Population density of the Berlin-Brandenburg metro region in 2015

=== Municipality ===
On 31 December 2015, the city-state of Berlin had a population of 3,520,031 registered inhabitants in an area of 891.85 km^{2} (344.35 sq mi). Berlin in 2009 was estimated to have another 100,000 to 250,000 non-registered inhabitants. The city's population density was 4,048 inhabitants per km^{2}. Berlin is the most populous city proper in the EU.

=== Urban area ===
The urban area of Berlin comprised about 4.1 million people in 2014 in an area of 1,347 km^{2} (520 sq mi), making it the seventh most populous urban area in the European Union. The urban agglomeration of the metropolis was home to about 4.5 million in an area of 5,370 km^{2} (2,070 sq mi).

=== Metropolitan area ===
As of 2014, the functional urban area was home to about 5 million people in an area of approximately 15,000 km^{2} (5,792 sq mi). The entire Berlin-Brandenburg capital region has a population of more than 6 million in an area of 30,370 km^{2} (11,726 sq mi).

== Population ==
Berlin population statistics are published using two different statistical bases. The official population figure (Bevölkerungsfortschreibung) is based on the census and is subsequently updated for births, deaths and migration. Separate population-register statistics (Einwohnerregisterstatistik) are based on residents registered with their main residence in Berlin and provide more detailed data for boroughs and smaller geographical areas. At the end of 2025, the official population was 3,700,577, while the population register listed 3,913,644 residents with their main residence in the city.

In 2025, Berlin recorded 33,230 births and 37,575 deaths, resulting in a natural population decrease of 4,345. This was the fourth consecutive year in which deaths exceeded births. The total fertility rate was 1.18 children per woman, the lowest since 2003. Net migration of 19,699 more than offset the natural decrease, and the city's population grew by 0.4%.

=== Boroughs ===
The following figures are based on Berlin's population register and refer to residents registered with their main residence in the city.

Demographic characteristics of Berlin's boroughs, 31 December 2025
Borough	Population	Foreign nationals	Migration background	Largest groups by country of origin (Note: The four largest groups among the selected countries of origin reported by the Amt für Statistik Berlin-Brandenburg for residents with a migration background. The published borough-level data do not include every country of origin.)
Mitte	397,879	36.9%	59.3%	Turkey, Poland, Russia, India
Friedrichshain-Kreuzberg	292,789	30.6%	50.6%	Turkey, Italy, Poland, US
Pankow	428,900	19.7%	31.2%	Ukraine, Russia, Poland, Turkey
Charlottenburg-Wilmersdorf	343,625	26.9%	47.3%	Turkey, Ukraine, Poland, Russia
Spandau	261,266	27.0%	47.3%	Turkey, Poland, Ukraine, Syria
Steglitz-Zehlendorf	309,338	17.7%	33.9%	Poland, Turkey, Ukraine, US
Tempelhof-Schöneberg	358,835	23.4%	43.8%	Turkey, Poland, Ukraine, Syria
Neukölln	331,623	28.8%	52.7%	Turkey, Poland, Lebanon, Syria
Treptow-Köpenick	302,686	17.8%	27.7%	Poland, Turkey, Ukraine, Syria
Marzahn-Hellersdorf	296,687	20.2%	31.5%	Russia, Vietnam, Ukraine, Romania
Lichtenberg	318,261	25.7%	38.6%	Vietnam, Ukraine, Syria, Russia
Reinickendorf	271,755	23.1%	42.0%	Turkey, Poland, Ukraine, Syria
Berlin	3,913,644	24.9%	42.3%	Turkey, Poland, Ukraine, Russia

=== Nationalities ===
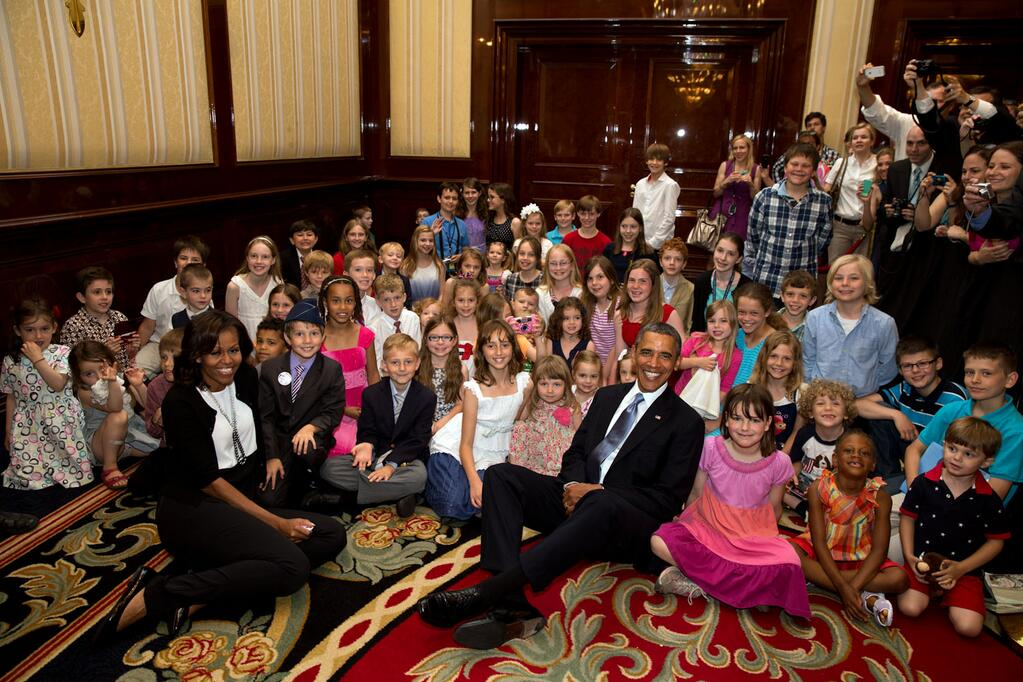
Sons and daughters of U.S. embassy staff in 2013

Native population by district (2020)

As of December 2025, about 42.3% registered residents of Berlin had a migration background, compared with 29.9% in 2015. Out of that, 976,419 residents (24.9%) were foreign nationals and 678,774 (17.3%) were German citizens with a migration background.

Berlin's foreign population is highly diverse, as 22 citizenship groups each numbered more than 10,000 registered residents.

The share of residents with a migration background varied considerably between boroughs, ranging from 27.7% in Treptow-Köpenick to 59.3% in Mitte. It exceeded 50% in Mitte, Neukölln and Friedrichshain-Kreuzberg.

Residents by citizenship, 31 December 2025
Country of citizenship	Population
Total registered residents	3,913,644
Germany	2,937,225
Turkey	108,077
Ukraine	75,867
Poland	50,967
India	48,111
Syria	41,180
Russia	35,644
Italy	34,057
Bulgaria	31,442
Romania	30,948
Vietnam	30,830
Afghanistan	24,979
United States	21,276
Serbia	21,012
France	19,053
China	16,854
Spain	15,867
United Kingdom	14,547
Greece	14,158
Iran	13,377
Croatia	13,131
Other foreign citizenships	292,068
Stateless, unclear or unspecified	22,974

== Employment ==
In 2015, the total labour force in Berlin was 1.85 million. The unemployment rate reached a 24-year low in November 2015 and stood at 10.0%. From 2012 to 2015 Berlin, as a German state, had the highest annual employment growth rate. Around 130,000 jobs were added in this period.

== Languages ==
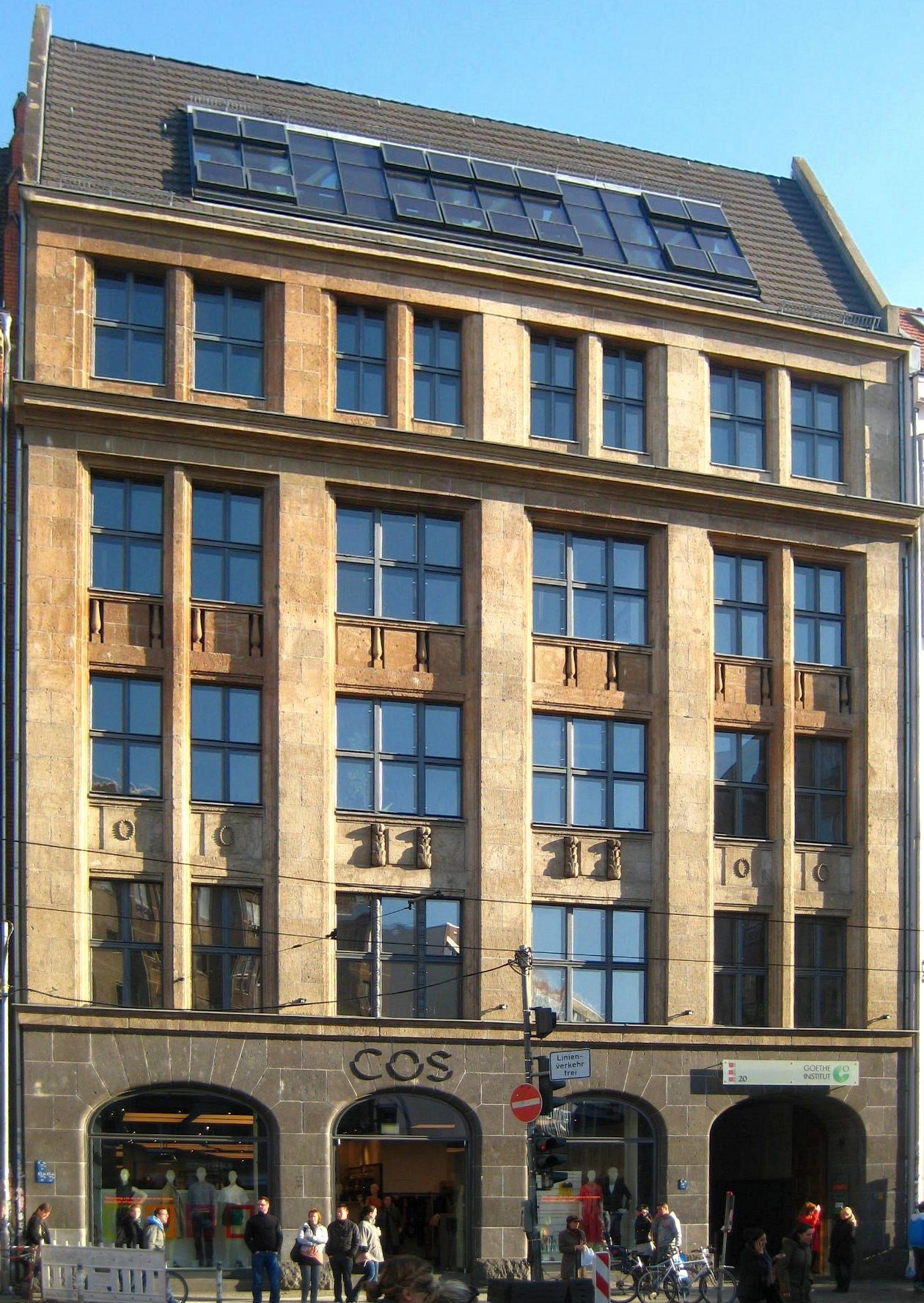
Goethe Institut, German language academy, in Berlin Mitte

German

German is the official and predominant spoken language in Berlin. It is a West Germanic language that derives most of its vocabulary from the Germanic branch of the Indo-European language family. German is one of 24 languages of the European Union, and one of the three working languages of the European Commission.

Berlin dialect

Berlinerisch or Berlinisch is a variety of High German. It is spoken in Berlin and the surrounding metropolitan area. It originates from a Brandenburgish variant. The regiolect is now seen more as a sociolect, largely through increased immigration and trends among the educated population to speak standard German in everyday life.

International languages

The most commonly spoken foreign languages in Berlin are English, Turkish, Russian, Arabic, Polish, Kurdish, Vietnamese, Serbian, Croatian, Greek, and other Asian languages.

Turkish, Arabic, Kurdish, Serbian and Croatian are heard more often in the western part, due to the large Middle Eastern and former-Yugoslavian communities; English, Vietnamese, Russian, and Polish have more native speakers in eastern Berlin.

== Religions ==
Religions in Berlin (2010)
1. Irreligious (60.1%)
2. EKD Protestants (15.7%)
3. Islam (11.4%)
4. Catholicism (9.10%)
5. Other Christian (2.70%)
6. Other Religion (1.00%)

More than 60% of Berlin residents have no registered religious affiliation. The largest denomination in 2010 was the Protestant regional church body – the Evangelical Church of Berlin-Brandenburg-Silesian Upper Lusatia (EKBO) – a United church. EKBO is a member of the Evangelical Church in Germany (EKD) and Union Evangelischer Kirchen (UEK), and accounts for 18.7% of the local population. The Roman Catholic Church has 9.1% of residents registered as its members. About 2.7% of the population identify with other Christian denominations (mostly Eastern Orthodox, but also various Protestants).

An estimated 300,000–420,000 Muslims reside in Berlin, making up about 8–11 percent of the population. 0.9% of Berliners belong to religions other than Christianity or Islam. Of the estimated population of 30,000–45,000 Jewish residents, approximately 12,000 are registered members of religious organizations.

== See also ==
- List of metropolitan areas by population
- Largest urban areas of the European Union
- List of people from Berlin
- Demographics of Germany
